= Edificio Grassy =

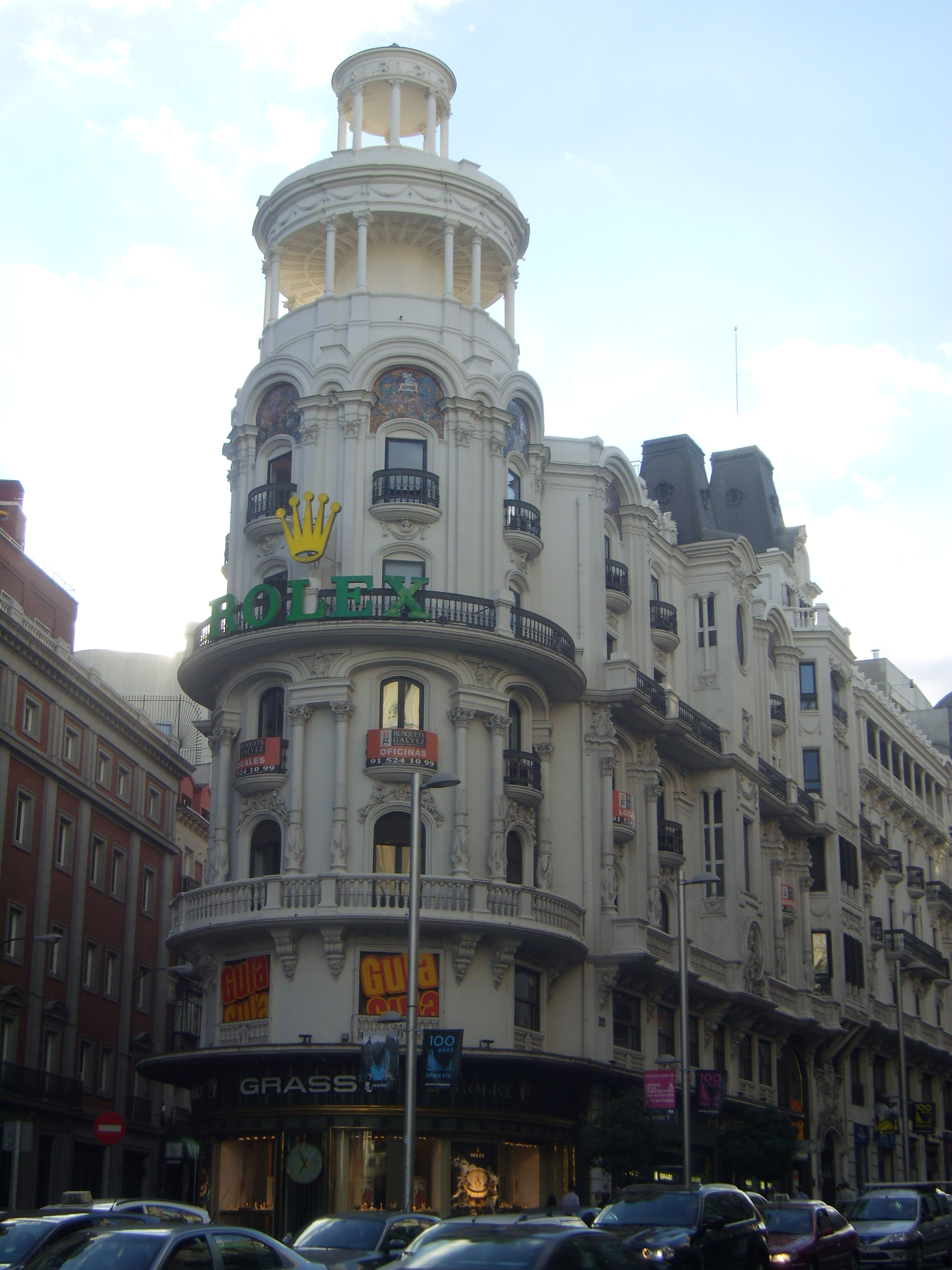
- Edificio Grassy in Gran Vía
- Interactive map of the Edificio Grassy area

General information
- Type: Office
- Architectural style: Eclectic
- Location: Gran Vía 1 Madrid
- Coordinates: 40.41907°N 3.69787°W
- Construction started: 1916
- Completed: 1917

Design and construction
- Architect: Eladio Laredo y Carranza

The Edificio Grassy is a building located at 1 Gran Vía in Madrid, Spain.

== Architecture ==
Situated just off Calle de Alcalá, at the very beginning of Gran Vía, the Edificio Grassy was built between 1916 and 1917. It was constructed on a triangular piece of land, in the same way as the Edificio Metrópolis next to it. Moreover, its architect Eladio Laredo aimed to achieve an architectural similarity between both of them. This trend was respected to a certain extent along Gran Vía.

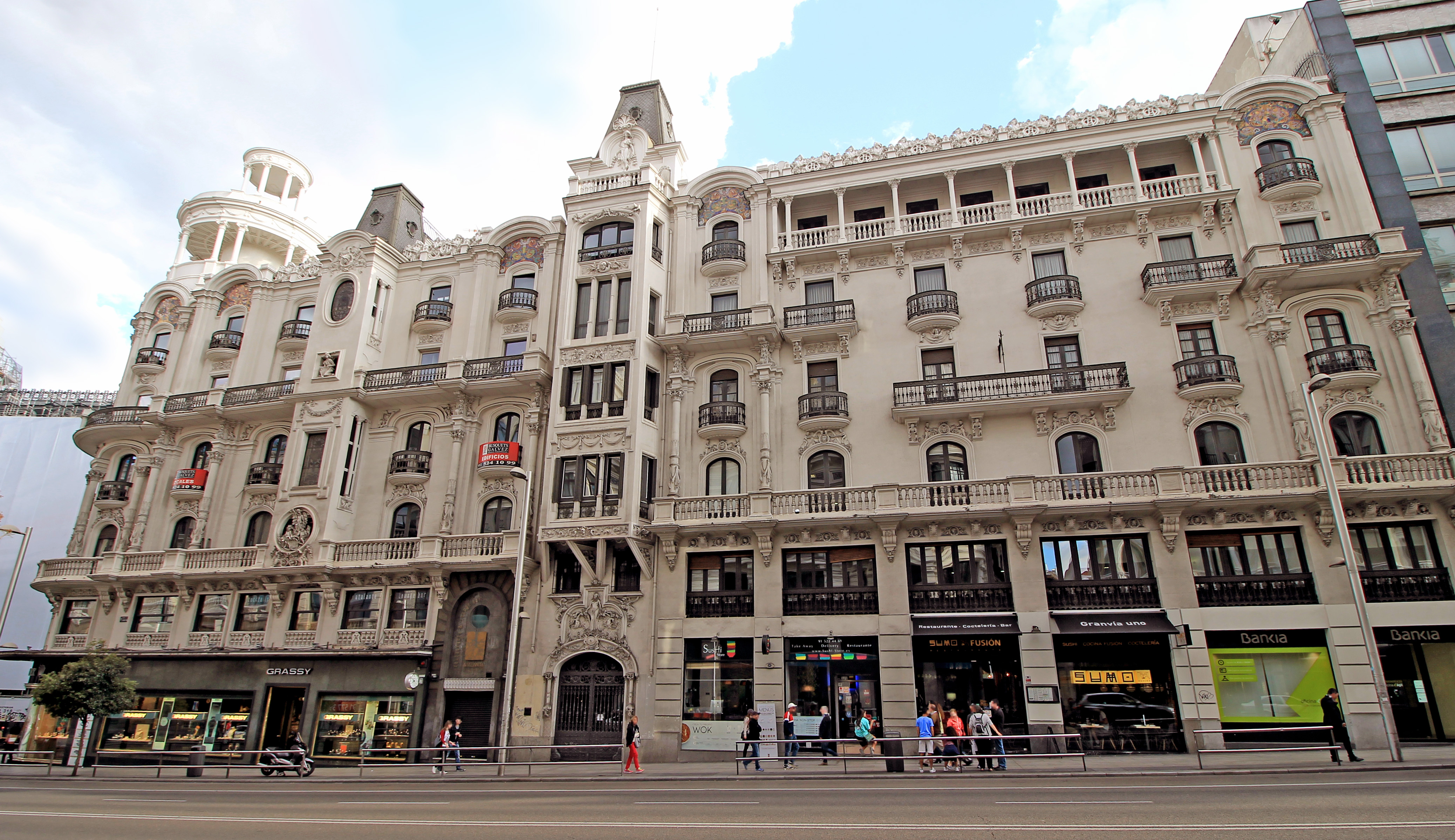
North façade seen from Gran Vía.

It comprises two independent buildings, which are joined together by the hall and the patio. Eclectic in its architecture, it boasts a rotunda topped by two superimposed belvederes of Renaissance influence.

== Nowadays ==
Since 1952 it hosts the upscale Grassy Jeweler's. Its basement also houses a museum of ancient clocks, with remarkable French, German and English items which span from the 16th to the 19th century, conforming an interesting private collection.

The facade of the building is well known for its illuminated advertisements about different brands of watches. For the last decades Jaeger-LeCoultre, Audemars Piguet, Piaget and Baume et Mercier have enjoyed a preeminent position, easily distinguishable at the entrance of Gran Vía. Currently the sought-after location is occupied by a Rolex sign.

== Facts ==
In 1981, the Edificio Grassy was immortalized by painter Antonio López in his hyperrealist masterpiece "La Gran Vía".

A plaque placed at the entrance of the building facing to Calle del Caballero de Gracia informs that in spring 1840 Théophile Gautier lived in this area.
