= Metropolis Building, Madrid =

Building in Madrid, Spain

Metropolis Building
- Edificio Metrópolis
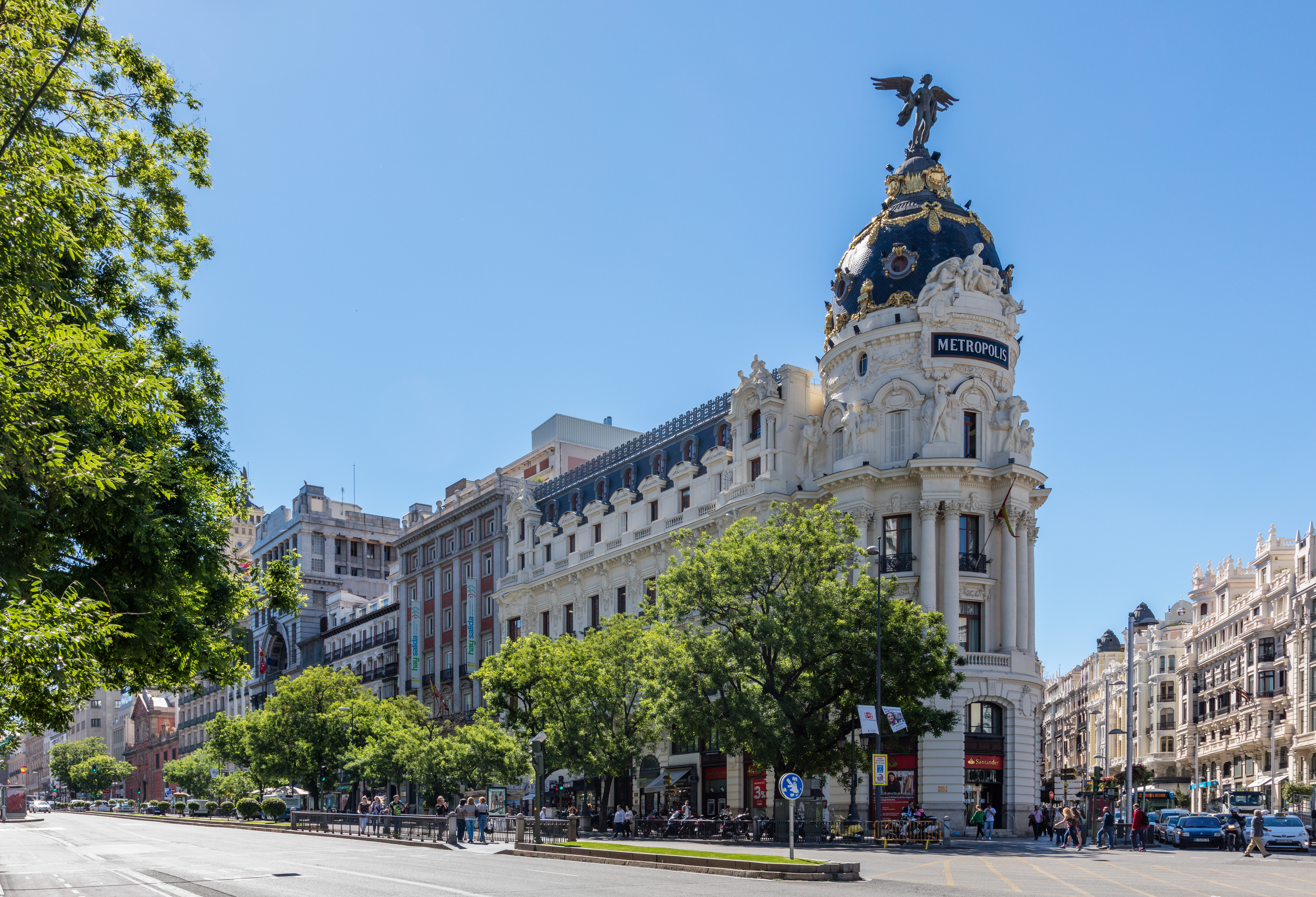
- Interactive map of the Metropolis Building area

General information
- Architectural style: Beaux-Arts
- Location: Madrid, Spain
- Coordinates: 40°25′08″N 3°41′50″W
- Construction started: 4 June 1907
- Completed: 21 January 1911
- Renovated: 1972, 1988, 1995
- Client: La Unión y el Fénix
- Owner: Metrópolis Seguros

Height
- Height: 45 m (148 ft)

Technical details
- Floor count: 5

Design and construction
- Architects: Jules and Raymond Février

The Metropolis Building or Edificio Metrópolis (Spanish) is an office building in Madrid, Spain, at the corner of the Calle de Alcalá and Gran Vía. Designed by a French architect named Jules Février, was designed in 1907 and inaugurated in 1911, it was designed by Jules and Raymond Février for the insurance company La Unión y el Fénix. It is currently owned by Metrópolis Seguros.

== History ==
=== Start of construction ===
After La Unión y el Fénix acquired the ground in 1905, they launched an international competition for the opportunity to design their building. Among French and Spanish architects, Jules and Raymond Février won, and construction started in 1907.

For its construction, five homes had to be demolished between two streets: Calle de Alcalá and Calle del Caballero de Gracia. At that time, the Gran Via was still in design phase.

In 1910 construction was finished, and on 21 January 1911 the building was inaugurated.

=== New owners ===
In 1972 Metrópolis Seguros acquired the building, and the previous owner decided to take the original statue away with them, by then very familiar in Madrid's skyline, to their new headquarters. This original statue that used to be on top of the building, depicted the mythological Phoenix and Ganymede sitting on its wing. It is currently on display in the gardens around the Mutua Madrileña building, Paseo de la Castellana nr 33.

=== Restoration ===
Metrópolis Seguros put a great deal of effort restoring the building. They understood that it was one of Madrid's landmarks and should be maintained. This went in a few steps but works started right after Metrópolis Seguros bought the building.

In 1988 the facade was fully cleaned, together with the roof, basements and central courtyard. In November 1995 the delicate task of restoring the windows of the main staircase were done by the original artists, Maurnejean Vidrieras Artisticas and Antonio Herraiz, SA, retaining their original appearance.

At the end of 1996 the most important work was carried out, which restored the entire facade, with focus on the sculptures which were heavily damaged by environmental pollution and pigeons.

Original statue that used to be on top of the dome (now moved to another office premises), is symbol of 'La Unión y el Fenix'.

== Architecture ==
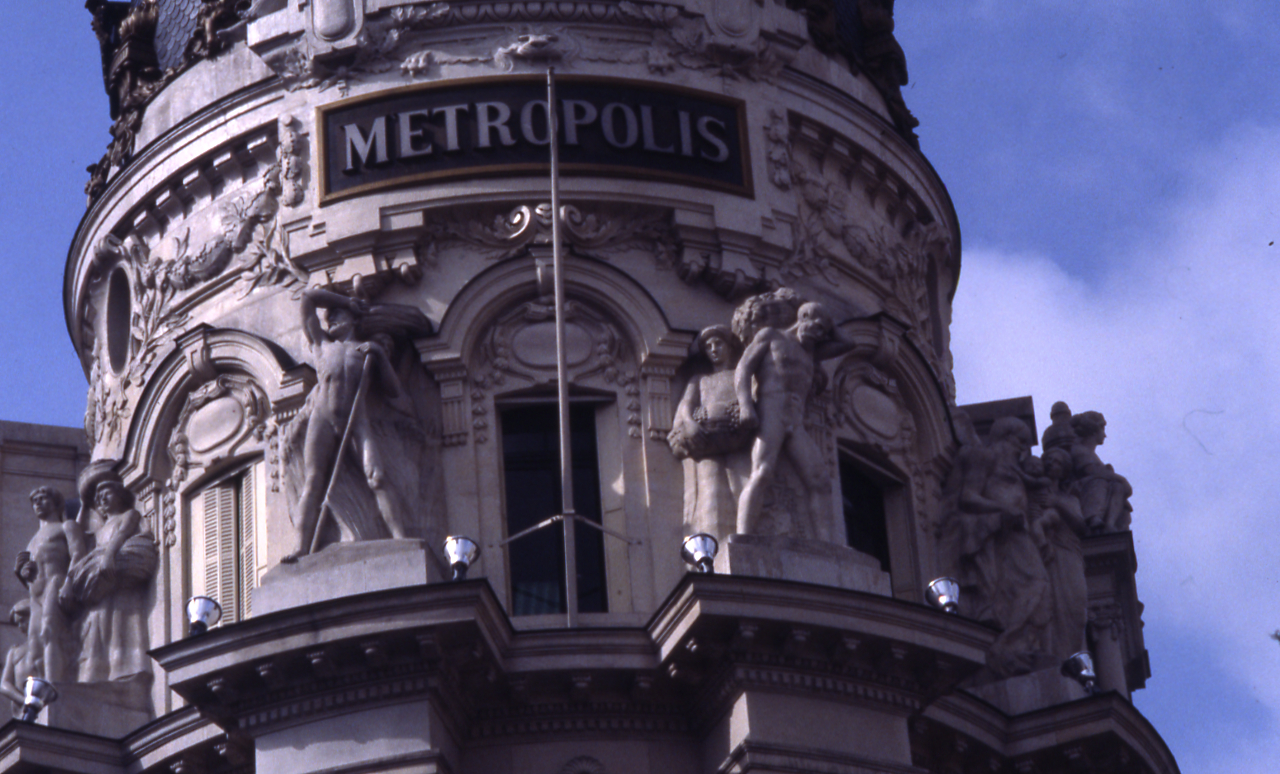
Detail photographed by Paolo Monti

Jules and Raymond Février gave the building a French, Beaux-Arts style, which was quite unusual at the time.

The ground level is topped by ornate colonnaded upper floors. The columns support 4 statues representing Mining, Agriculture, Industry and Commerce, made by Saint Marceaux and L. Lambert. At the foot of the dome you'll find a statue sculpted by D. Mariano Benlliure.

The rounded cupola is covered with 30000 leaves of 24 carat gold.

== Location ==
It is commonly assumed Gran Vía starts at the Edificio Metrópolis. However, its real address is Calle de Alcalá 39. The first building at the beginning of Gran Vía is the Edificio Grassy.

== Gallery ==
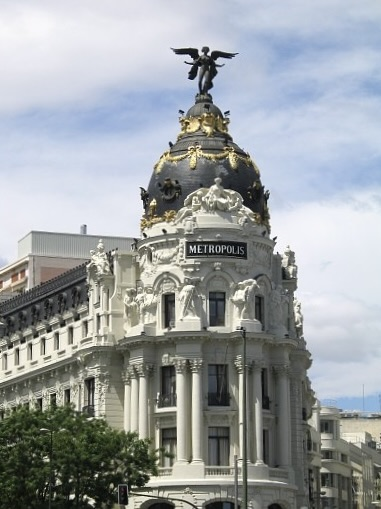

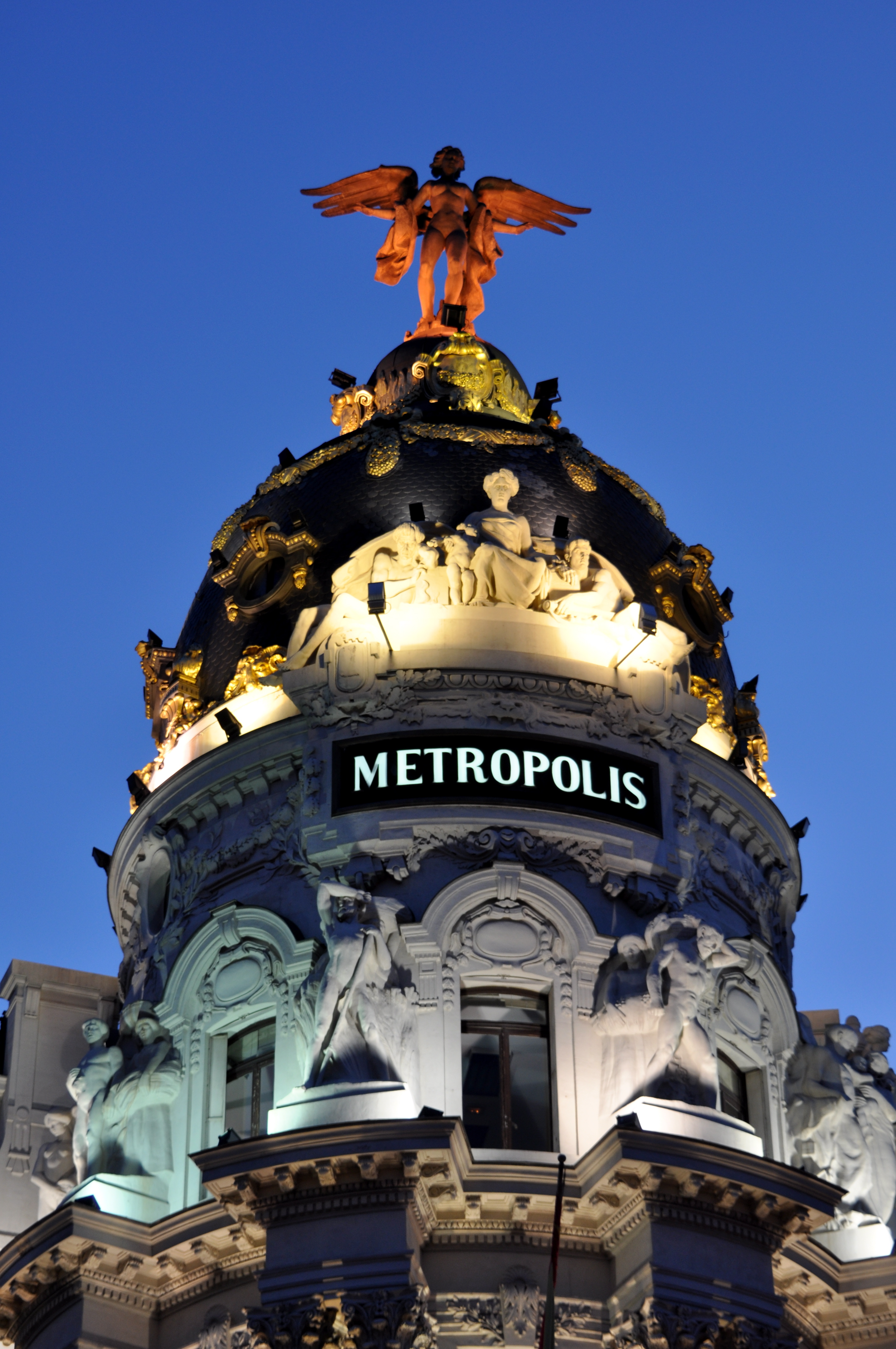

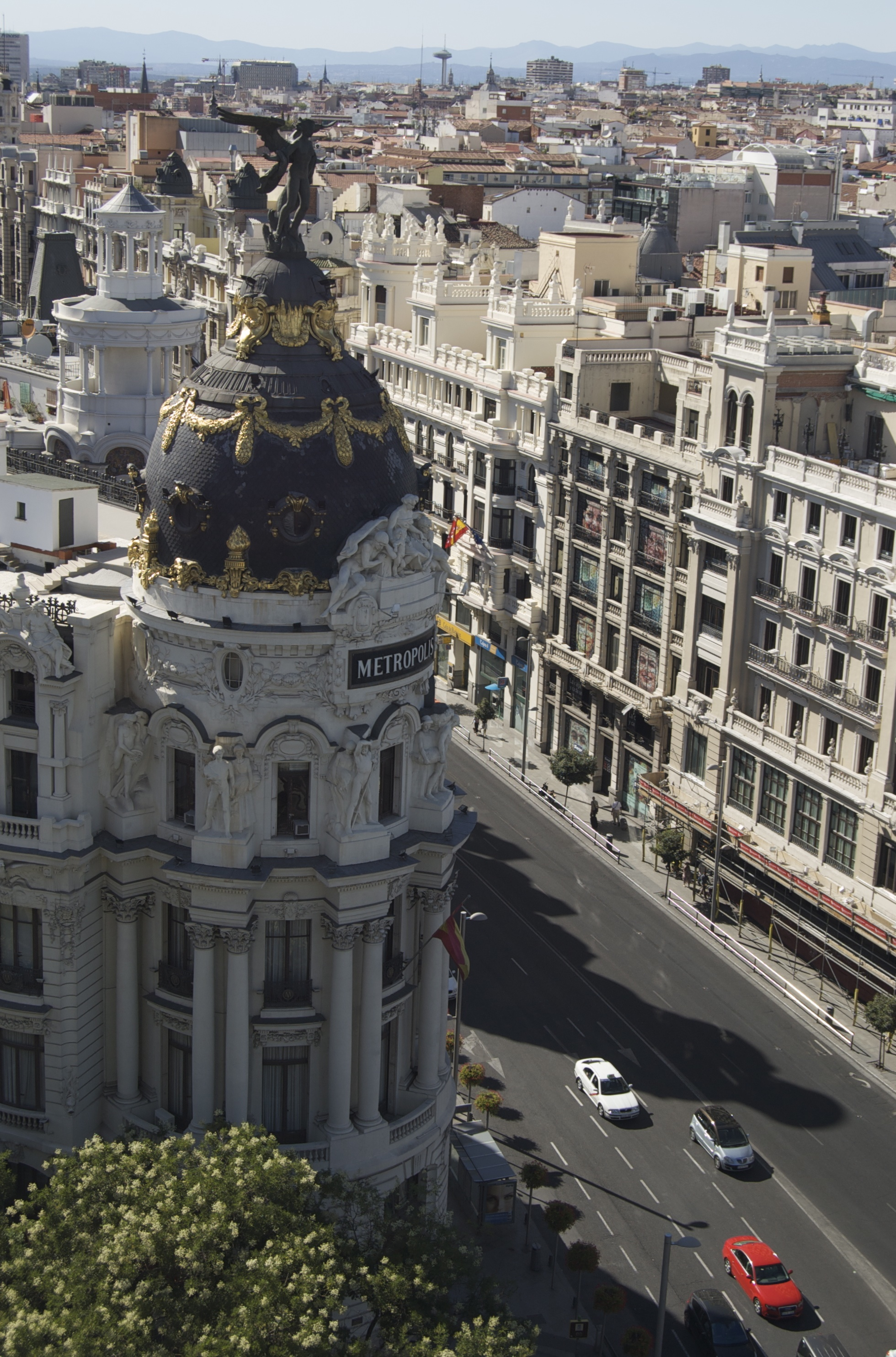

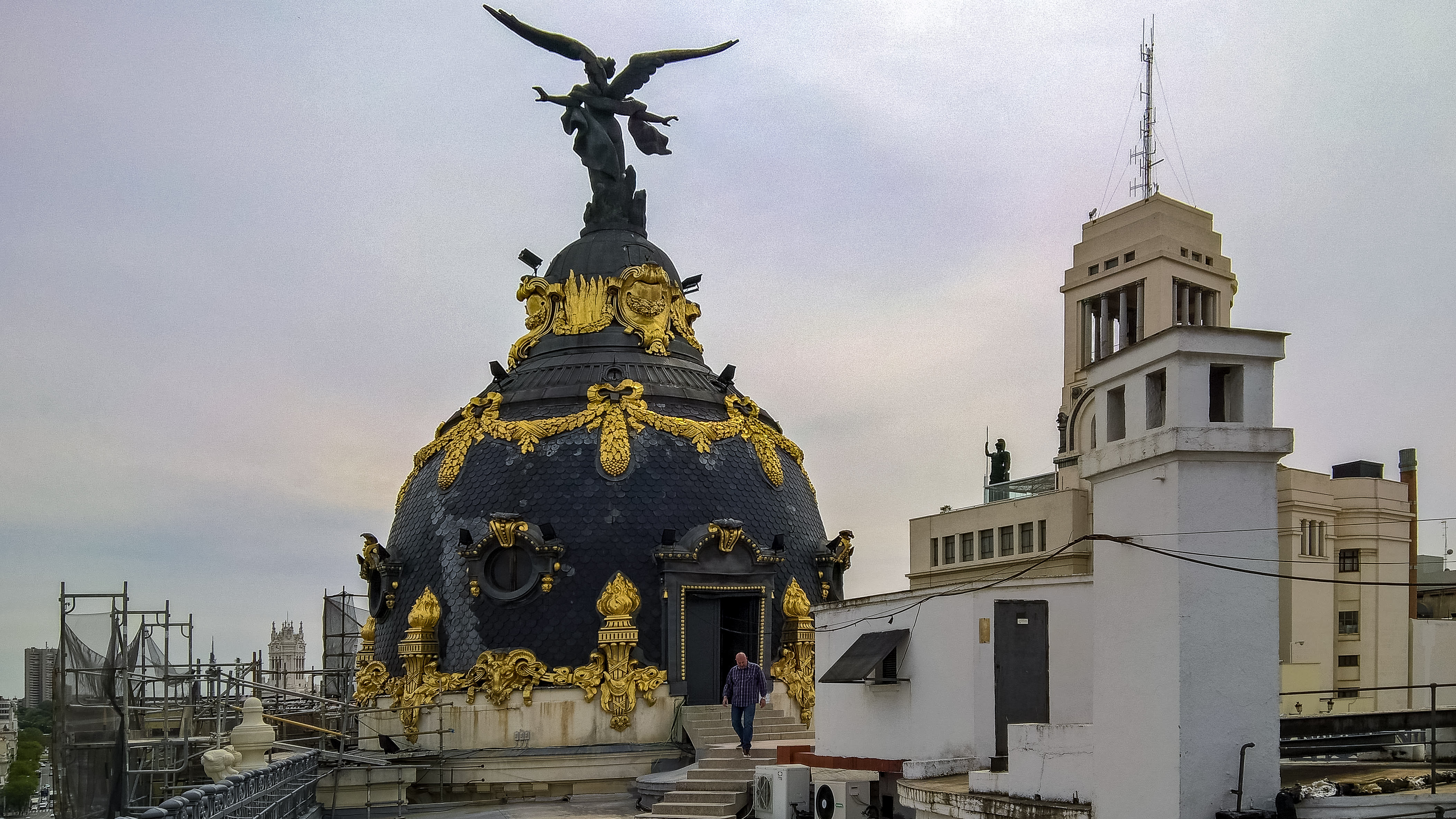

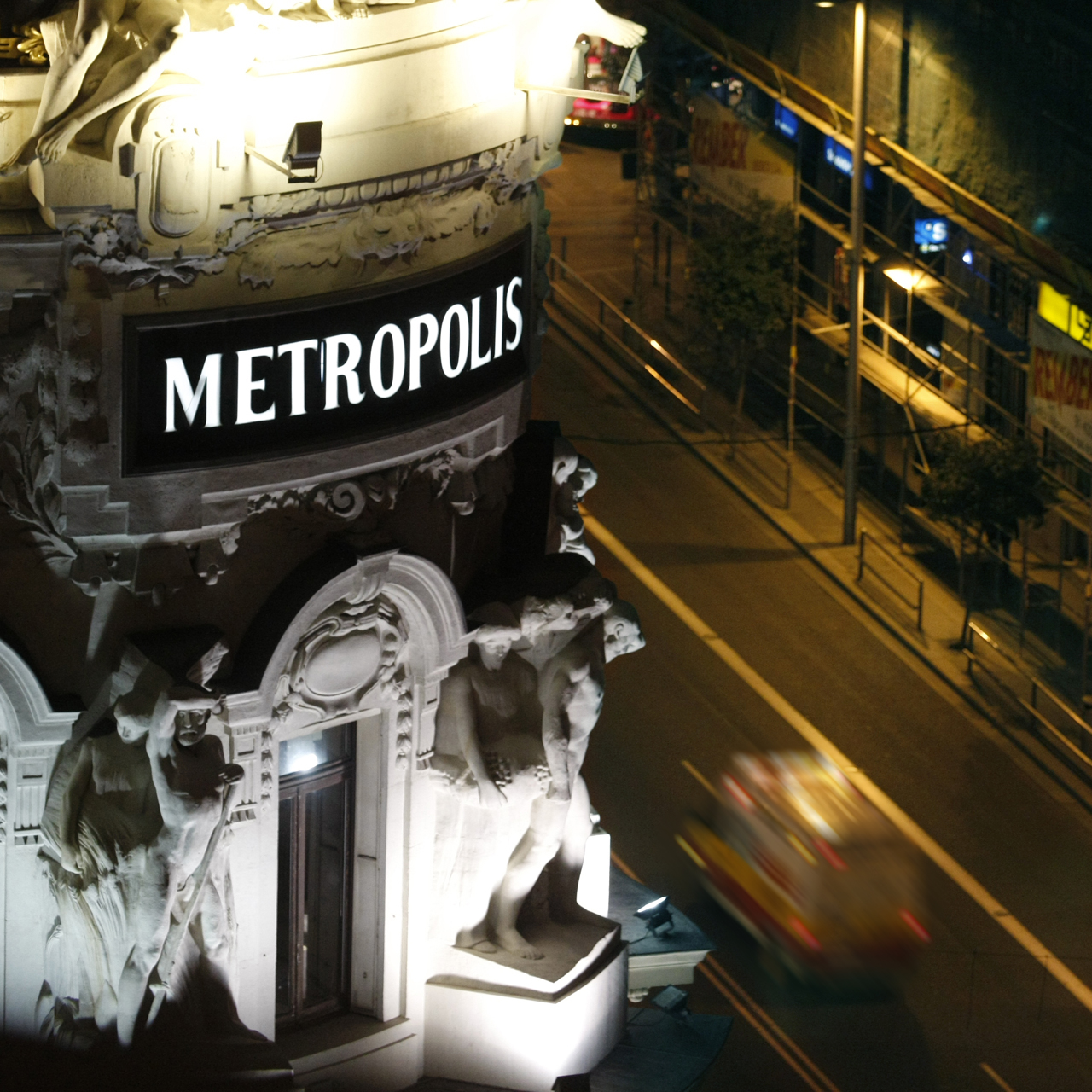

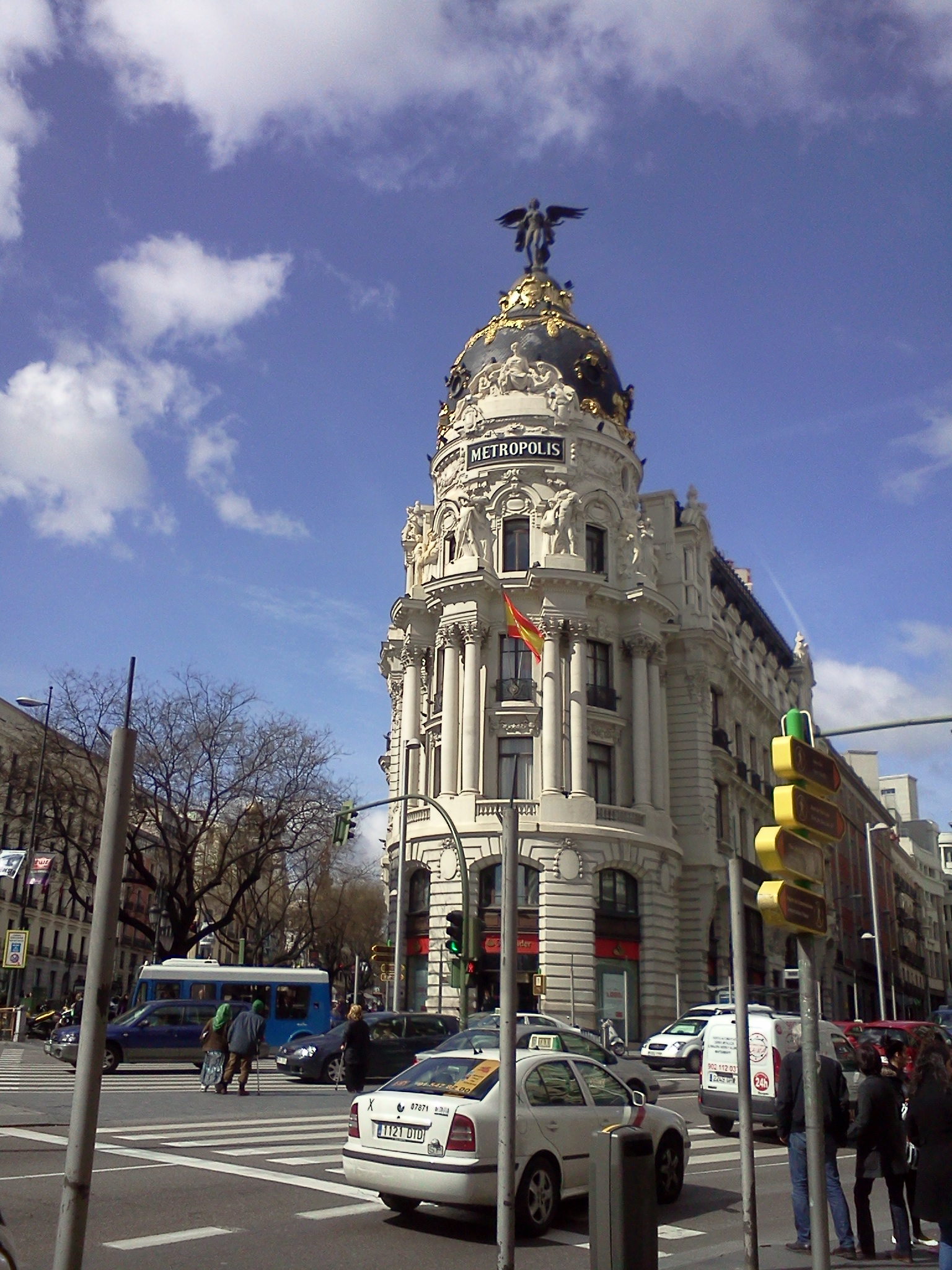

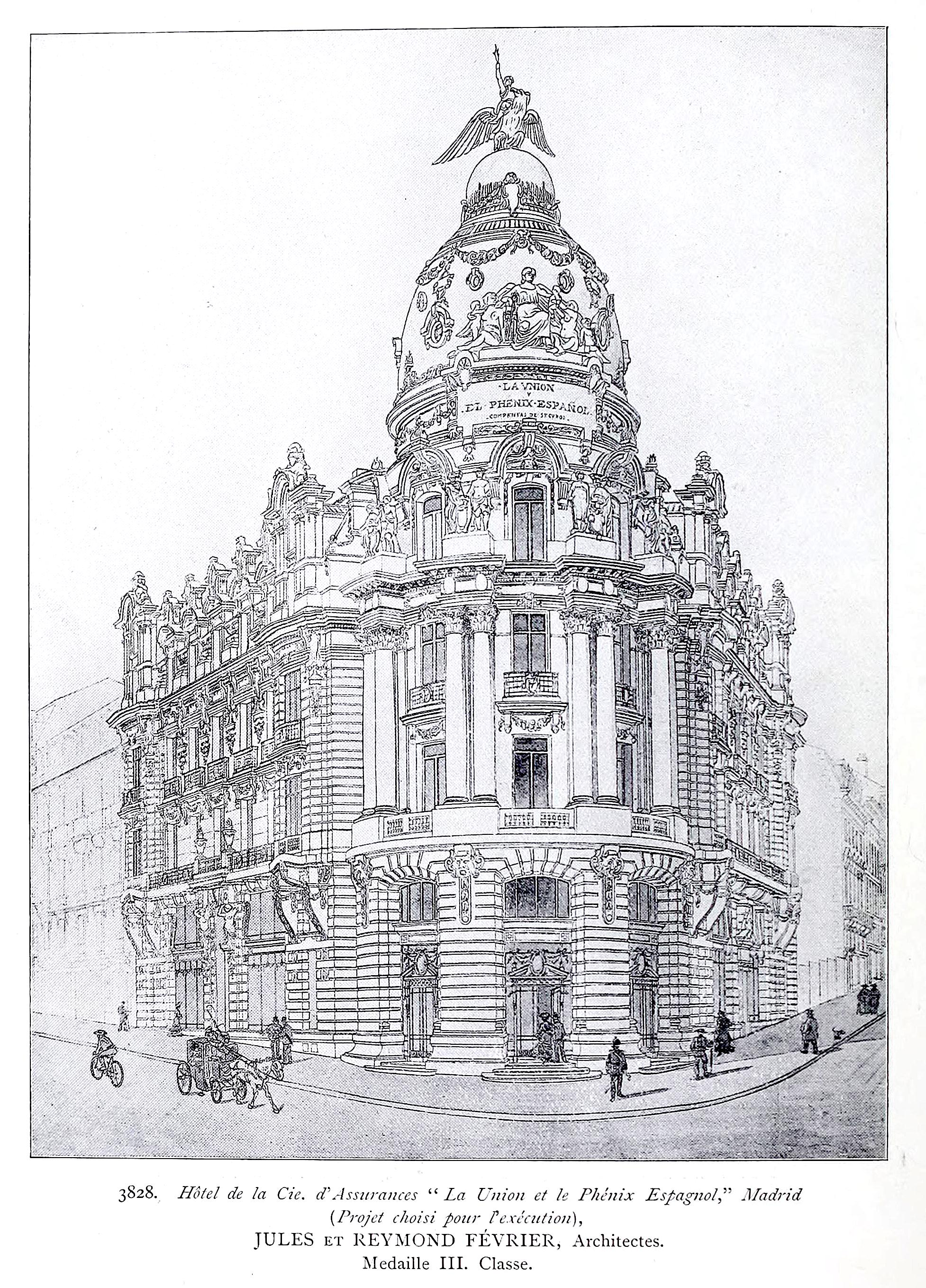
Perspectice Drawing

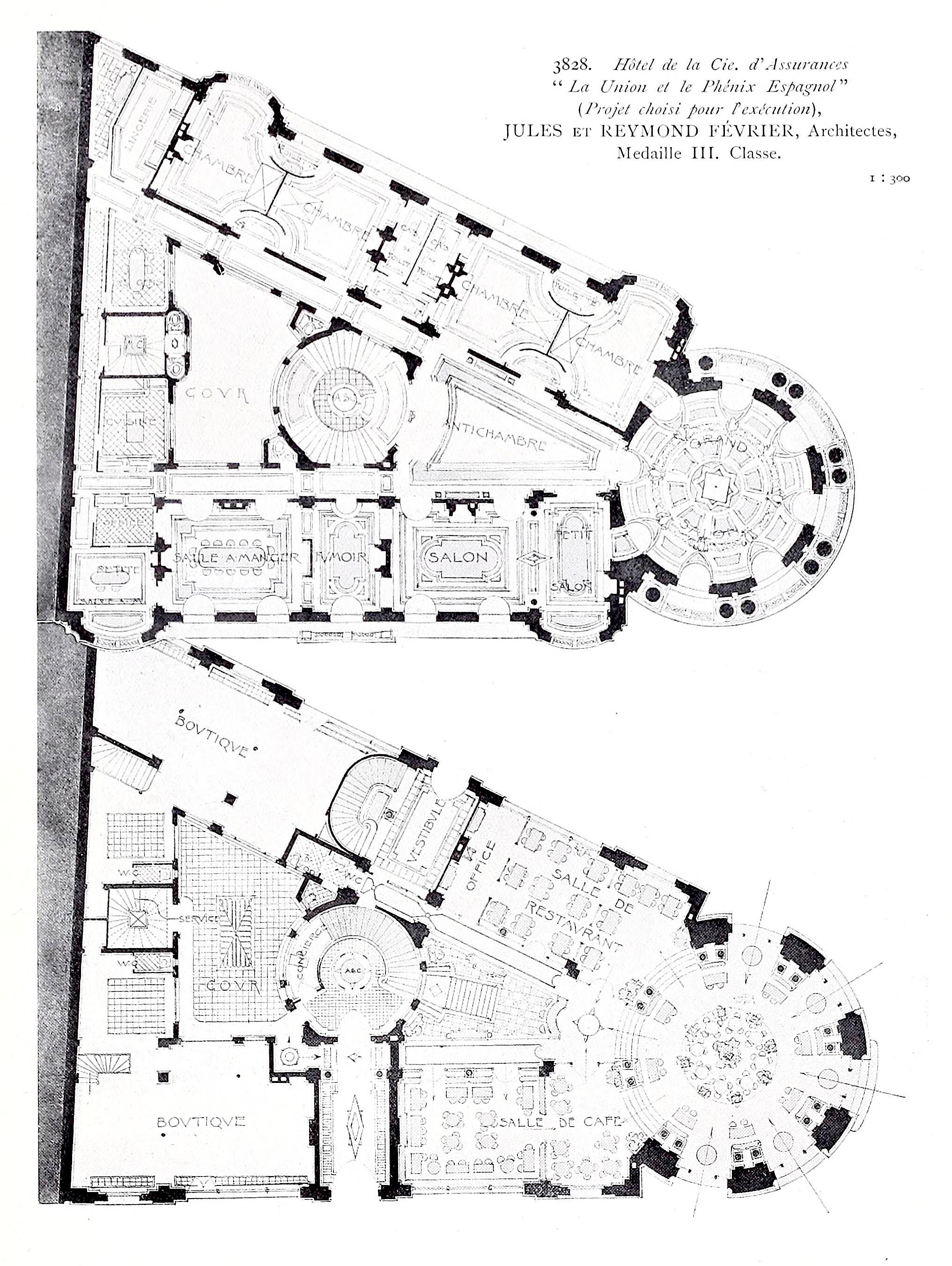
Plans

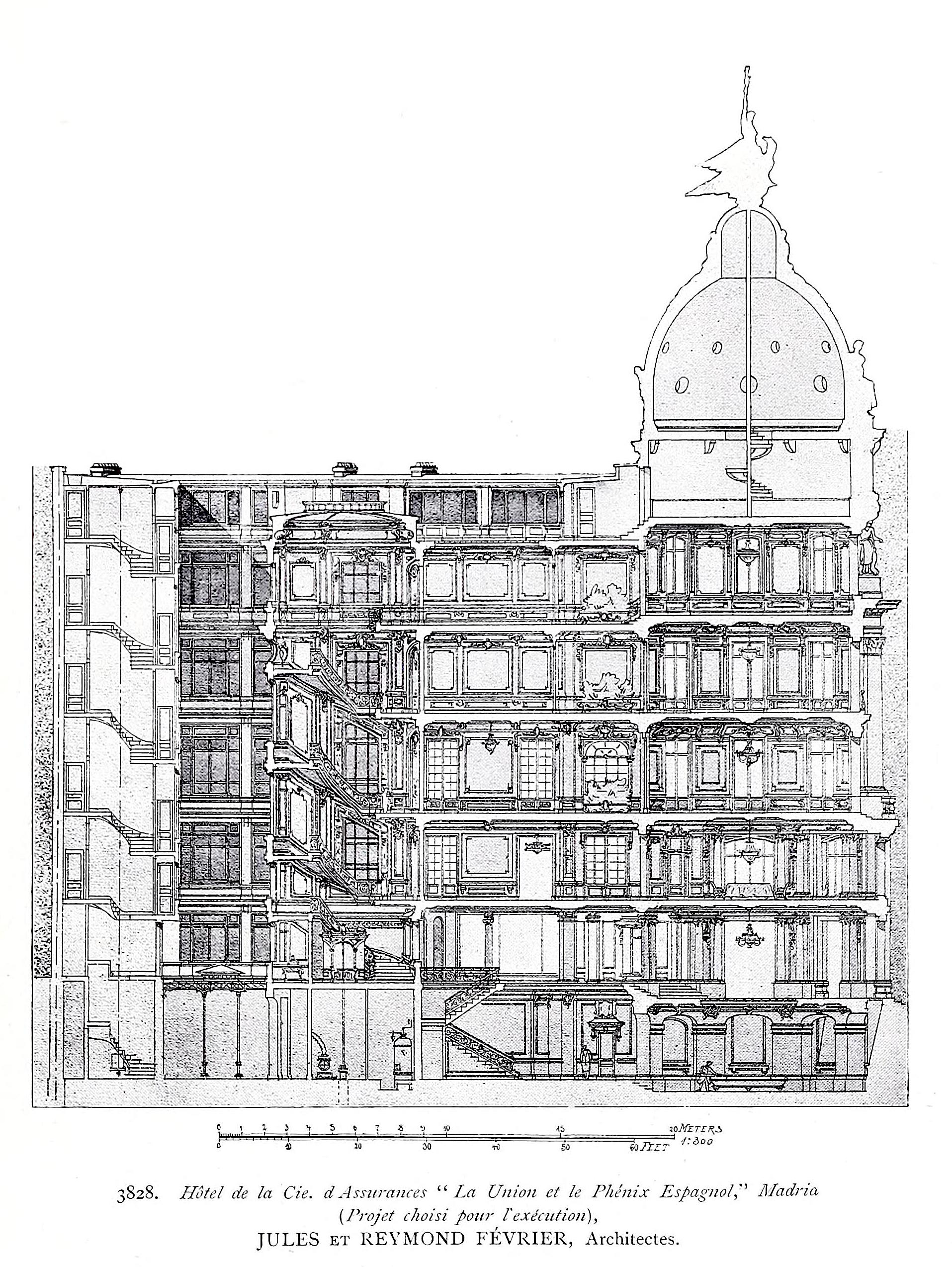
Section

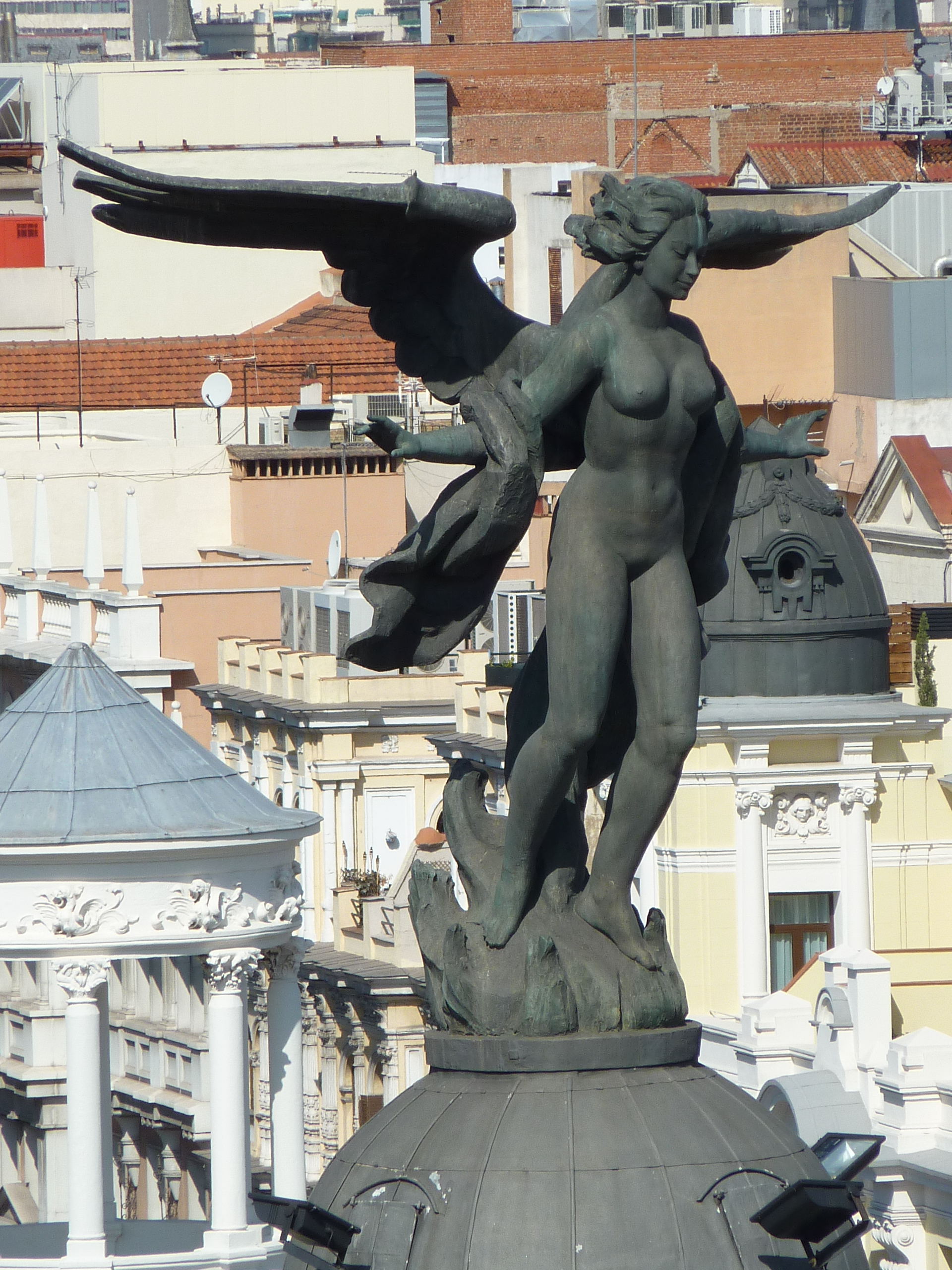
Victoria Alada, the winged victory topping the dome since 1977
