= Gran Vía 11, Madrid =

- Hotel de las Letras
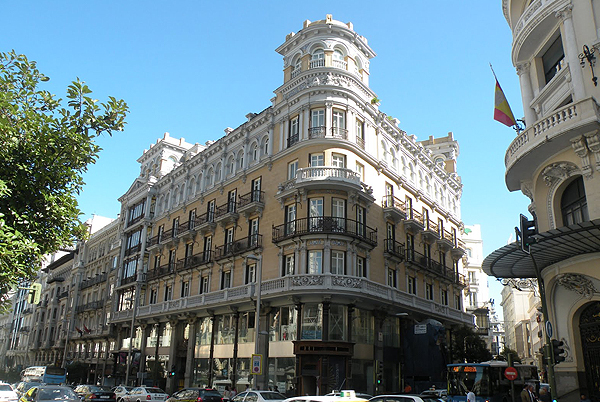

General information
- Location: Madrid, Spain
- Inaugurated: 1917

Technical details
- Floor count: 7

Design and construction
- Architect(s): Cesáreo Iradier

The Gran Vía 11 Building, also known at the time of its construction as Viviendas para el Conde de Artaza (Home units for the Count of Artaza), is a property located at Gran Vía 11 in Madrid. It was designed by architect Cesáreo Iradier. The building is part of the Catalog of Protected Buildings of the Madrid City Council.

Since 2005, the property accommodates the Hotel de las Letras.

== History ==
The property was built on a site previously occupied by the Hotel de Roma. The Count of Artaza purchased the land of the old hotel and demolished it during the urban reforms that led to the creation of the first section of Gran Vía at the beginning of the 20th century. The popular aristocrat commissioned architect Cesáreo Iradier to create a residential building on the land he had acquired. The works began in 1915 and ended officially in 1917. They achieved a Special Mention in the Madrid City Council Awards for the "Best Constructed Buildings of year 1917".

From that same year, multiple commercial firms occupied the eight spaces reserved for this purpose that were on the ground floor and the mezzanine. The rest of the floors of the building were originally projected to be dwellings but later changed to accommodation and tourist services.

== Architecture ==
The design implements the usual tripartite solution, (Note: The building's facade is characterized by three major divisions: a base, consisting of the lower stories; a cap, the stories on the top of the building; and the main body, consisting of the floors between the base and the cap.) which in this case is even more evident because there are no walls at the double-height base, and they are substituted almost entirely by pairs of slender granite pillars at the main entrance and at the wall angles to the three different streets. These pillars alternate with thin cast iron columns to provide the maximum surface area for shop windows.

Over this commercial base, a balcony closed by a rich parapet runs through the entire facade without interruption to mark the start of the main body of the building, which consists of three floors. The first floor is pierced by paired balconies, and by individual balconies with wrought iron guard rails on the second floor. The attic is made of a rich gallery of mullioned windows separated by prominent columns. The splendid bay window at the party wall should also be noted, flanked by elongated pilasters decorated with grotesques that end up supporting a triangular pediment at the height of the cornice. Finally, the set is dominated by three corner towers with battlements and pinnacles.

The side and rear facades hardly differ from the main one to honor the symmetry around the turning axes, although the top floor of the rear facade is set back to comply with the regulations. The quality of the artistic work should also be noted: the grilles executed by the firm of García Nieto y Asins, the stained glass windows by Maumejean, and the ceramics that decorate the main entrance, window lintels and arcade tympana, executed on designs attributed to Francisco Arroyo for the Ruiz de Luna Talavera factory.

Although it was presented to the City Council awards for the best-built constructions of year 1916, the jury rejected it for judging it finished in 1917. This is why this year is engraved with roman numerals on the portal pilaster: "C. YRADIER / ARQUITECTO / MCMXVII". In 1917 it was awarded the prize with "honorable mention", and the architect was awarded a "cooperation diploma as a stimulus to the development of his activities".
