= Gran Vía, Madrid =

Thoroughfare in Madrid, Spain

Gran Vía
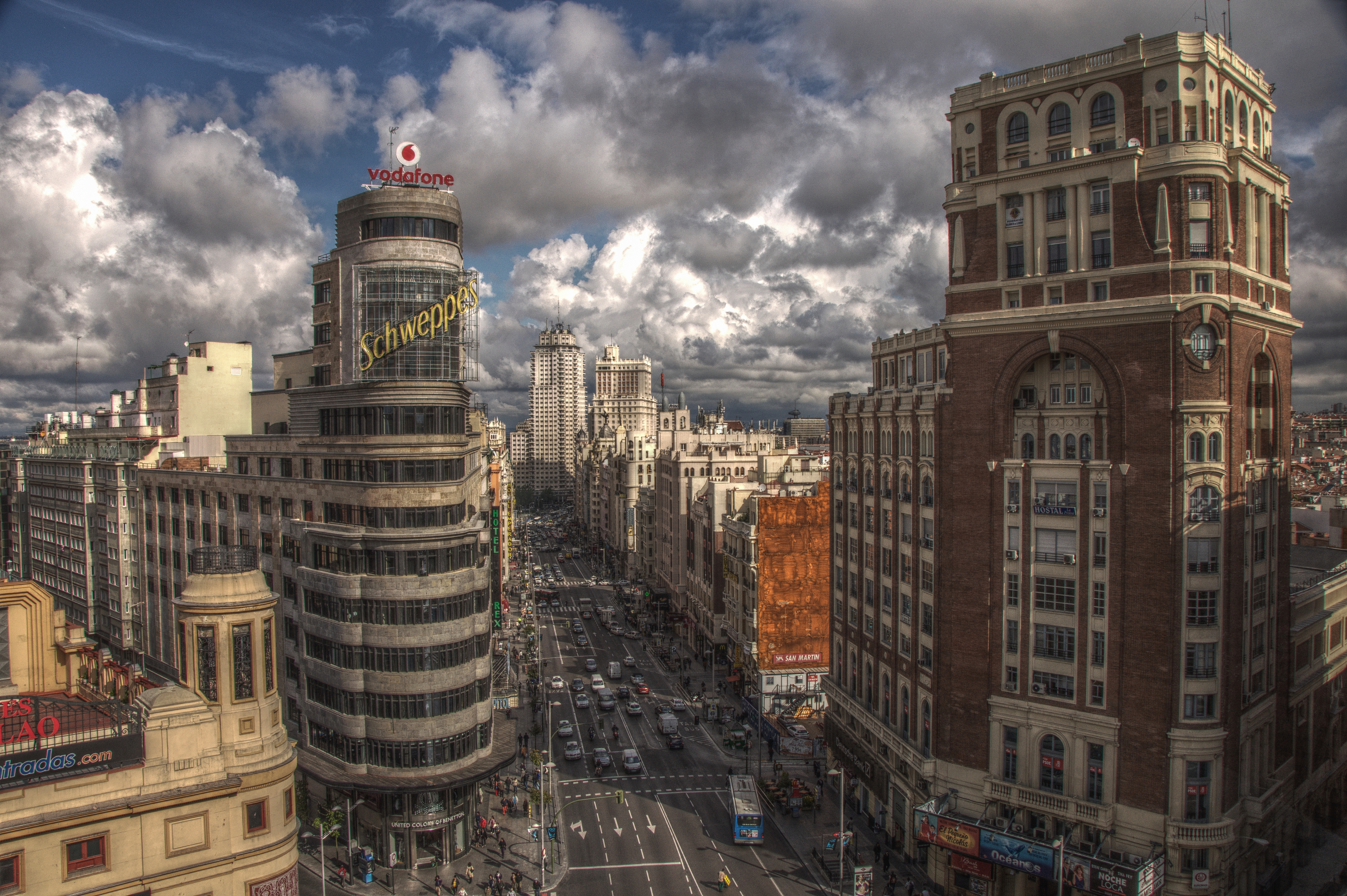
- Interactive map of Gran Vía
- Type: Street
- Length: 1.3 km (0.81 mi)
- Location: Madrid, Spain
- East end: Calle de Alcalá
- Major junctions: Calle de la Montera, Calle de Fuencarral, Plaza del Callao, Calle de San Bernardo
- West end: Plaza de España

The Gran Vía (Spanish: [ˈɡɾam ˈbi.a], Great Way) is a street in central Madrid, Spain. It leads from Calle de Alcalá, close to Plaza de Cibeles, to Plaza de España. The street, sometimes referred to as the "Spanish Broadway", is one of the city's most important shopping areas, with a large number of hotels and large movie theatres. However, since the late 2000s, many of these theatres have been replaced by shopping centres.

The Gran Vía serves as a showcase of early 20th-century revival architecture, with architectural styles including Vienna Secession style, Plateresque, Neo-Mudéjar, and Art Deco, among others.

== History ==
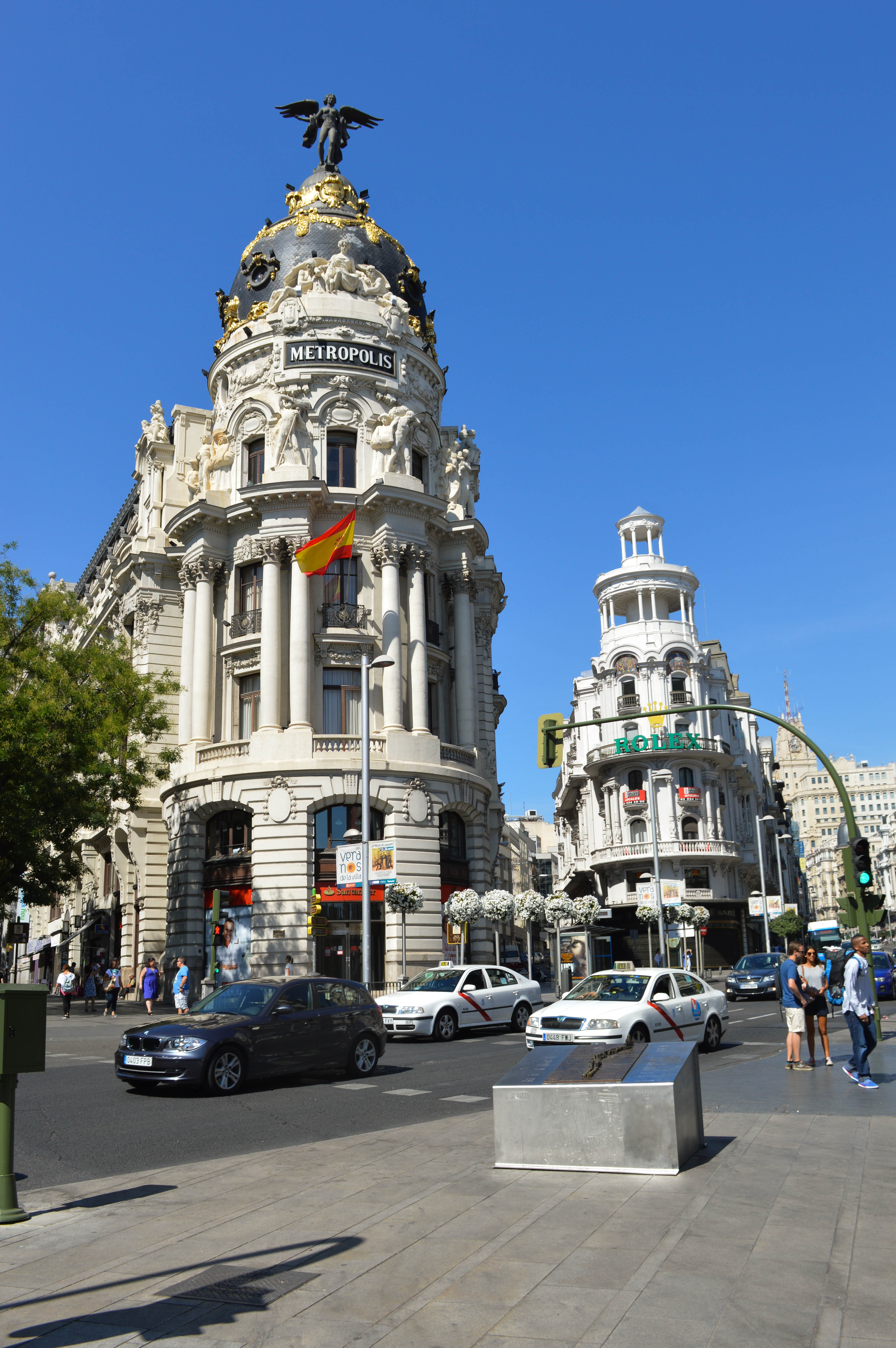
The Metropolis Building located in Gran Vía and Alcalá Street, 2014

=== Conception ===
In the mid-19th century, Madrid's urban planners determined that a new thoroughfare should be created, connecting the Calle de Alcalá with the Plaza de España – similar to Haussmann's renovation of Paris. The projects called for the demolition of many buildings in the centre of the city, earning the project the name of 'an axe blow on the map'. Decades after the first plans were revealed, ground-breaking and construction tarried causing the media to ridicule the project, cynically calling it the 'Gran Vía' or 'Great Way' or 'Big Way'. Finally in 1904, it was approved and construction started in 1910. The last part of the street was completed in 1929. At the end of March 2018, the city council of Madrid began the pedestrianization of a lane in each direction as part of a plan to extend sidewalks and remodel some squares around the street. This was related to the introduction of Madrid Central, a Residential Priority Area, later in 2018.

=== Names ===
The Gran Vía of Madrid has had many historical names, both official and unofficial. Conception divided the road into three parts. The first one was built between 1910 and 1917 and was called Calle del Conde de Peñalver ("Count of Peñalver Street"). The second part of the project commenced in 1917 and concluded in 1921. It was named Calle de Pi y Margall ("Francisco Pi y Margall Street") after a deceased politician. Construction of the third and last part of the road did not start until 1925 and was called Calle Eduardo Dato Iradier ("Eduardo Dato Street") after another politician.

Three months before the Spanish Civil War began, the Second Spanish Republic changed some street names under leftist influence. The two first parts of the avenue were called Avenida de la C.N.T. ("C.N.T. Avenue"). When the Civil War started, the avenue was renamed Avenida de Rusia ("Russia Avenue") due to the support the country had for the Spanish Republic, but soon its name would be changed to Avenida de la Unión Soviética ("Soviet Union Avenue"). However, the avenue was popularly nicknamed as Avenida de los obuses ("howitzer avenue") because of the continued bombardments by the Nationalist forces loyal to Francisco Franco. The reason for these attacks in this area was that the "Edificio de Telefónica" (the Spanish phone company) was on this street, and due to its height it served aviation as a reference point during shellings.

Just after the end of the war when the rebels entered Madrid, they renamed the road Avenida de José Antonio ("José Antonio Avenue") after one of their greatest political figures, founder of the fascist party, Falange. In 1981, once Spain had returned to democracy, the socialist mayor, Enrique Tierno Galván, restored the names of 27 streets and the avenue was simply named Gran Vía ("Great Way").

== Notable buildings ==
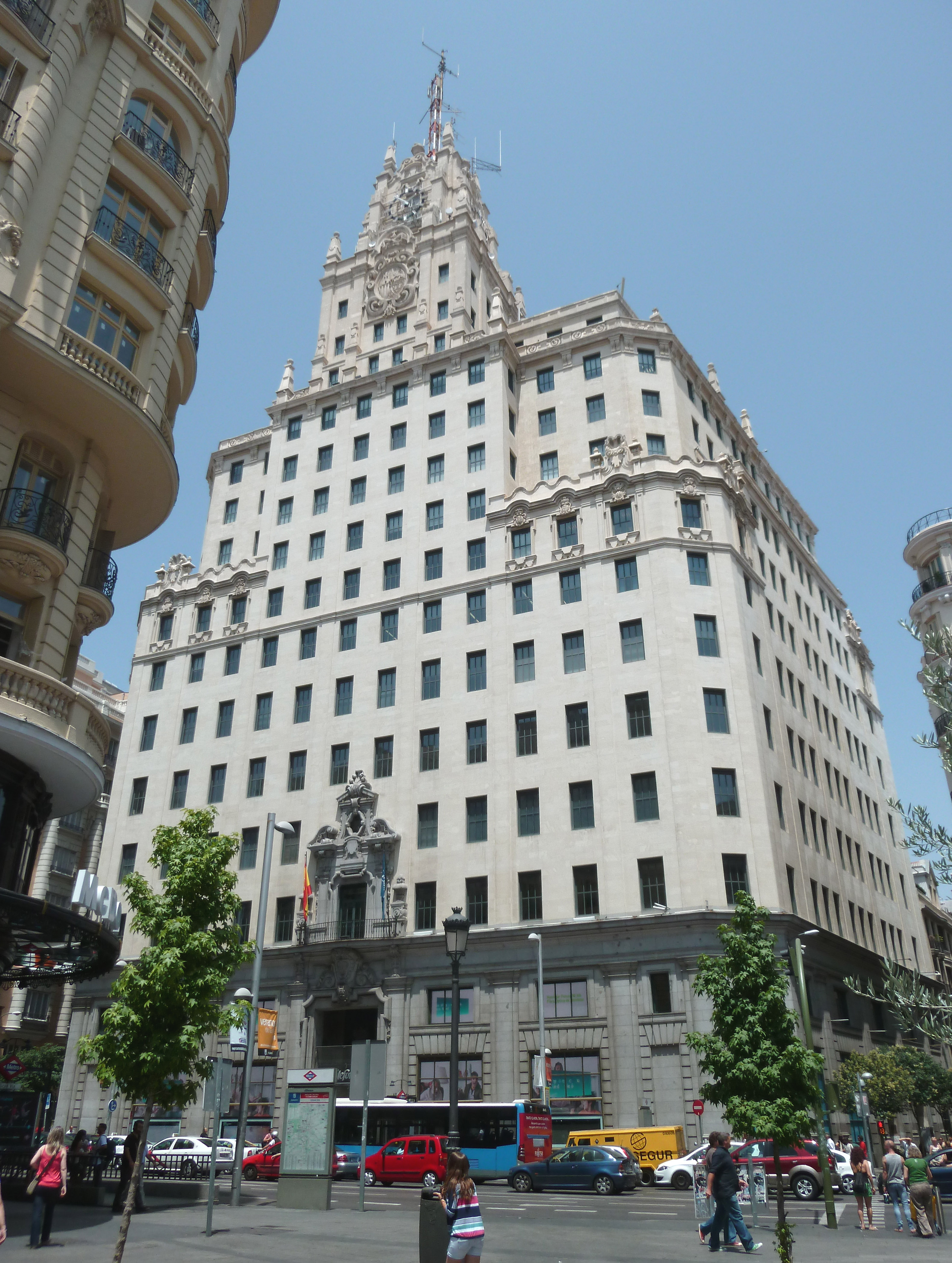
Telefónica headquarters in Gran Vía, 2011.

The new road created opportunities for architects, who had the opportunity to create large buildings in the latest architectural styles. The first eye-catching building starting on the Calle de Alcalá is the most famous of all, the Edificio Metrópolis or Metropolis Building. The landmark was built between 1907 and 1911 by the father and son architects Jules and Raymond Février. The original statue, La Unión y el Fénix was replaced in 1975 by a statue of a winged Goddess Victory.

A bit further along the Gran Vía, on the left-hand side is another landmark, the Edificio Grassy, another corner building with a small tower, built in 1917. Visible from here is the tower of the Telefónica Building, it was built between 1926 and 1929 for the Spanish telecommunications company. The 88-metre (290 ft) building was the tallest in Madrid and was designed by Ignacio de Cárdenas, who was inspired by a similar design intended to be built in New York City, by the American Louis S. Weeks.

Other buildings include:

- Casa del Libro
- Casa Matesanz
- Cine Avenida
- Cine Capitol
- Cine Coliseum
- Cines Rialto de Madrid
- Doña Manolita
- Edificio Carrión
- Estación de Gran Vía
- Teatro Fontalba
- La Gran Peña
- Cine Gran Vía
- Hotel de las Letras
- Calle de Jacometrezo
- Calle de los Libreros
- Edificio Lope de Vega
- Madrid Rock
- Museo Chicote
- Oratorio del Caballero de Gracia
- Palacio de la Música
- Palacio de la Prensa
- Pasapoga
- Red de San Luis
- Sociedad Madrid-París
- Teatro Coliseum

== Plazas ==
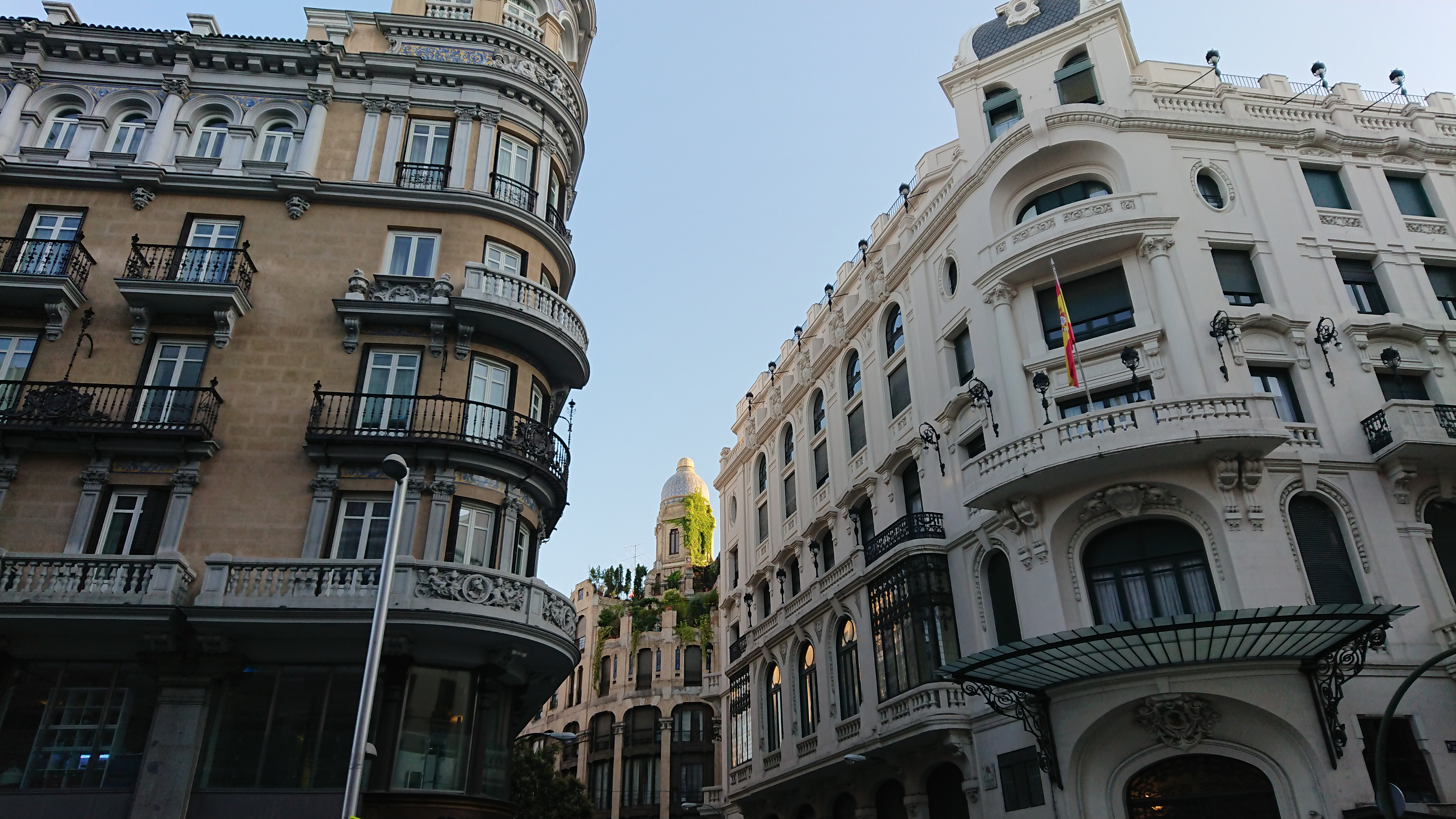
Hotel Las Letras (left), Casino Militar (right), 2018.

Further towards the Plaza de España, the Gran Vía crosses a small square, the Plaza del Callao, named after the Battle of El Callao. This square is the heart of cinematic Madrid, with about six movie theatres. One of them, the Capitol, is located in a beautiful Art Deco building. However, recent changes in building rules have allowed the reformation of the theatres into more lucrative shopping centres.

The last part of the Gran Vía, constructed between 1925 and 1929 leads to the Plaza de España, a large square dominated by two skyscrapers built in the 1950s, the symmetric Edificio España and the Torre de Madrid. Here the Gran Vía becomes the Calle Princesa, leading north to the Arco de la Victoria.

== In media ==
- La Gran Vía (1886) by Federico Chueca is a satirical zarzuela in which the anthropomorphized streets of Madrid complain about how the city will lose by their destruction and replacement by the new project.
- In a scene of the Álex de la Iglesia's 1995 sci-fi/horror film The Day of the Beast, Santiago Segura hangs above Gran Vía from the iconic neon advertisement for Schweppes on Edificio Carrión/Capitol.
- The opening scene of Alejandro Amenabar's 1997 film Open Your Eyes famously features a shocking view of the Gran Vía completely empty of vehicles and people. This was filmed in the early morning of a weekend in August 1996, and the street had to be intermittently closed off to traffic for six hours to achieve it. This shot was later recreated for the American remake, Vanilla Sky, at Times Square, New York.
- Gran Via is also the title of the 1995 album by Matt Bianco.
- The Sun Also Rises by Ernest Hemingway ends with Jake and Brett in a taxi on Gran Vía.
- At the end of Georges Conchon's 1959 novel "La Corrida de la victoire" (published in English as "The Hollow Victory") the protagonist – a former soldier of the Spanish Republic fleeing Spain after Franco's victory – takes the quixotic and defiant gesture of openly walking one last time along the Gran Vía in August 1939, at considerable risk to his life since captured Republicans were at this time often shot.
- Gran Vía is driven through as part of the "Madrid Drive" course in the mobile game Mario Kart Tour and the Booster Course Pass DLC for Mario Kart 8 Deluxe.
