= Peñalver (disambiguation) =

Peñalver may refer to:

- Peñalver, municipality in the province of Guadalajara, Castile-La Mancha, Spain
- Fernando de Peñalver Municipality, municipalities in the eastern Venezuelan state of Anzoátegui

People named Peñalver:

- Antonio Peñalver (born 1968), Spanish decathlete
- Carmen Peñalver (born 1961), Spanish politician
- Diana Peñalver (born 1965), Spanish actress
- Fernando Peñalver (1765–1837), Venezuelan independence leader
- Leandro Peñalver (born 1961), Cuban sprinter
- Eduardo Peñalver (born 1973), Cornell Law School Dean
