= Antonio Lancuentra =

Spanish academic

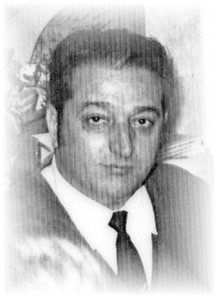
Antonio Lancuentra

Antonio Lancuentra (March 1, 1923 - March 22, 1975) was a Spanish academic, tax advisor, certified public accountant and professor at the University of Barcelona.

== Professional career ==
In 1948 he finished his studies as a Mercantile Professor and later reached the degree of Mercantile Intendant . He established his professional office Commercial Technical Consultancy (Consultemer) on Barcelona's Gran Vía, where he will develop his professional career dedicated to business accounting and tax advice.

Lancuentra died on March 22, 1975, at the age of 52.

A year earlier he had been awarded the Censor of the Year award together with Dr. Goxens Duch. In May 1975 they awarded him the Associative Collaboration Award from the National Association of Tax Advisors. And already in 1976 he was awarded the Medal for the Promotion of National Work .
