= Four Seasons Hotel Madrid =

Hotel in Madrid

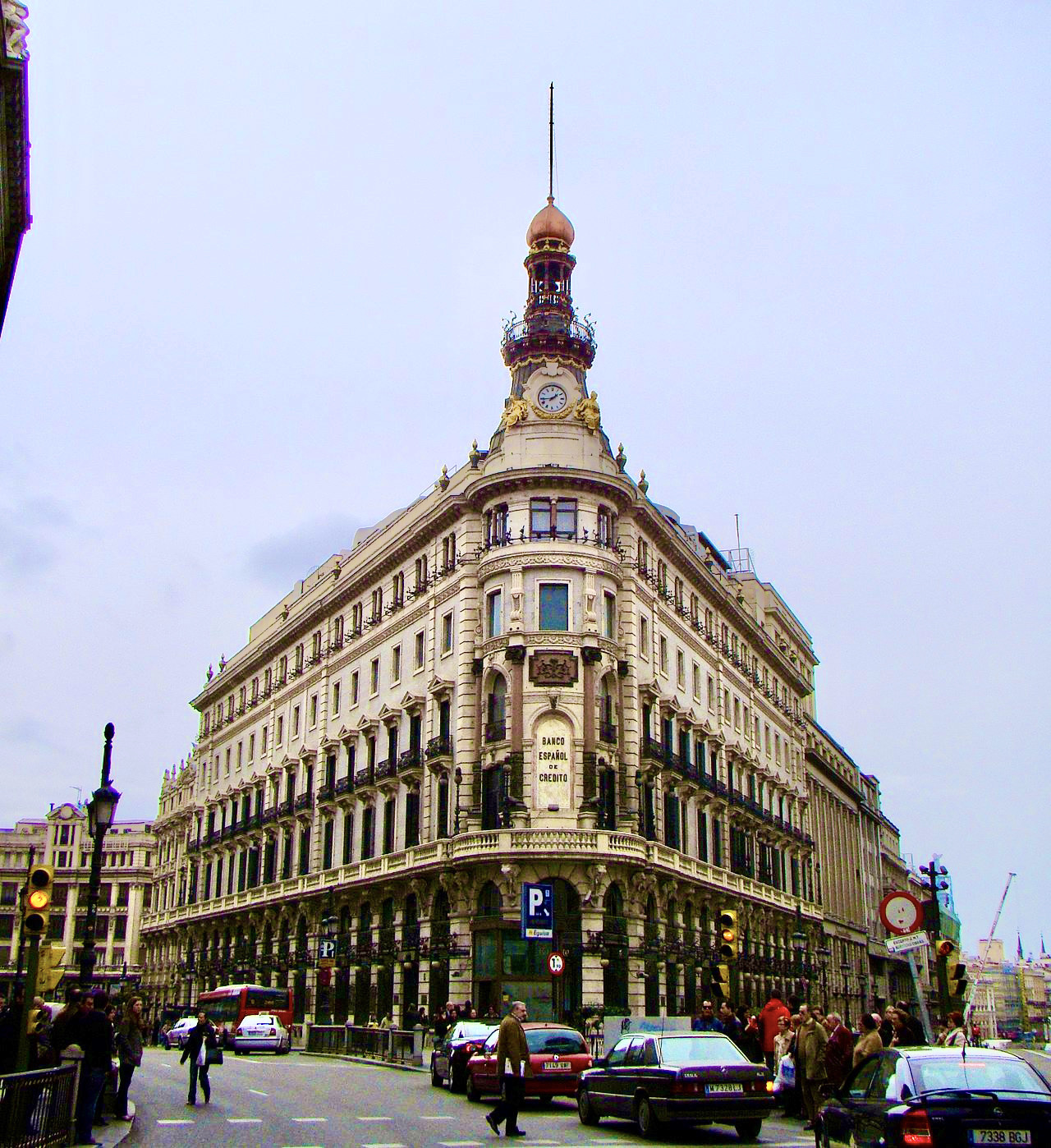
- Interactive map of the Four Seasons Hotel Madrid area

General information
- Type: Hotel
- Location: Calle de Alcalá, 14
- Completed: 1891
- Renovated: 2013–19

Design and construction
- Architects: José Grases Riera (original); Estudio Lamela (2013–19)

Website
- www.fourseasons.com/madrid/

The Four Seasons Hotel Madrid is a luxury hotel in Madrid, Spain, that opened in September 2020. The 200-room hotel is one of the largest and most expensive hotel in Madrid's history, with suites costing up to €12,000 a night.

Located in Madrid's city center and steps away from the Puerta del Sol, the building was originally constructed from 1887 to 1891 as the headquarters of La Equitativa insurance company, but is better known as being the headquarters of Banesto from 1920 to 2004. It underwent extensive renovations from 2013 to 2019 to become the first Four Seasons Hotel in Spain.

== History ==
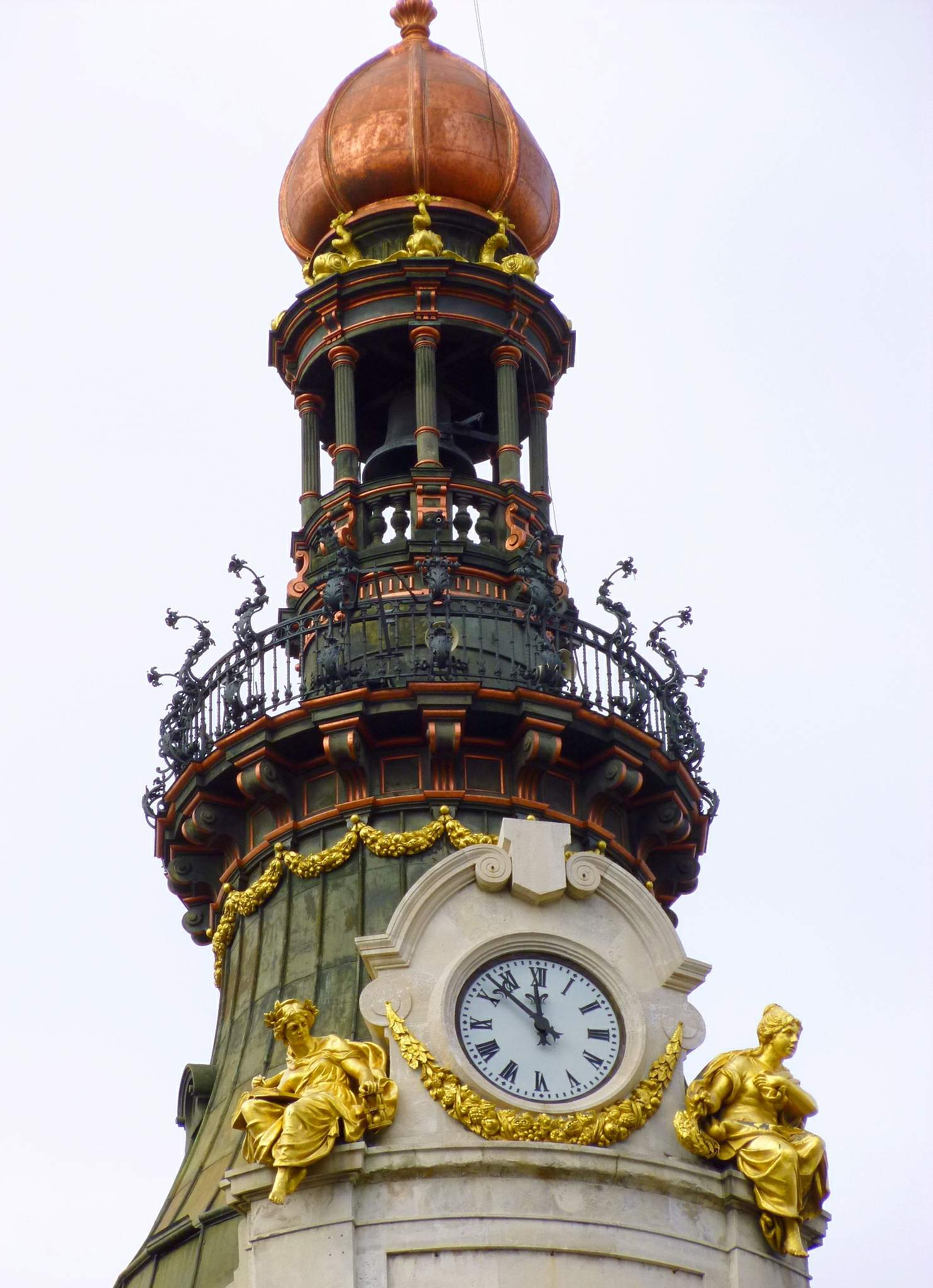
Bell tower of the hotel

The structure was built between 1887 and 1891 by Spanish architect José Grases Riera to serve as the headquarters of La Equitativa insurance company, and was known as the Palace of La Equitativa. From 1920 to 2004, it served as the headquarters of Spanish bank Banesto. After Banco Santander purchased Banesto, changed headquarters in 2004. Afterwards, the building stood empty and abandoned for several years.

In 2012, the building was declared as a cultural heritage monument. That same year, Santander sold the structure to construction company OHL, with plans to transform it into a luxury hotel. In late 2013, extensive repairs, restoration and renovations began to transform the neglected building into a hotel. The building's protection status posed several challenges and caused construction delays.

The hotel eventually became part of a €530 million project that restored six additional buildings right next to the hotel. The six smaller buildings eventually joined the Palace of La Equitativa to create an even bigger complex that not only includes the hotel, but also the luxury shopping mall La Galería de Canalejas.

== Hotel ==
Four Seasons Hotel Madrid has 200 hotel rooms, including 39 suites, two restaurants, a spa, meeting rooms, an indoor swimming pool and an expansive roof terrace. The top floors of the building are reserved for 22 private luxury residences, where residents have access to all hotel services, which sell for at least €2.4 million. The hotel room prices range from €500 for a single room to €12,000 for a suite, per night.
