= Gran Vía 32, Madrid =

Building in Madrid

Gran Vía 32
- Gran Vía 32
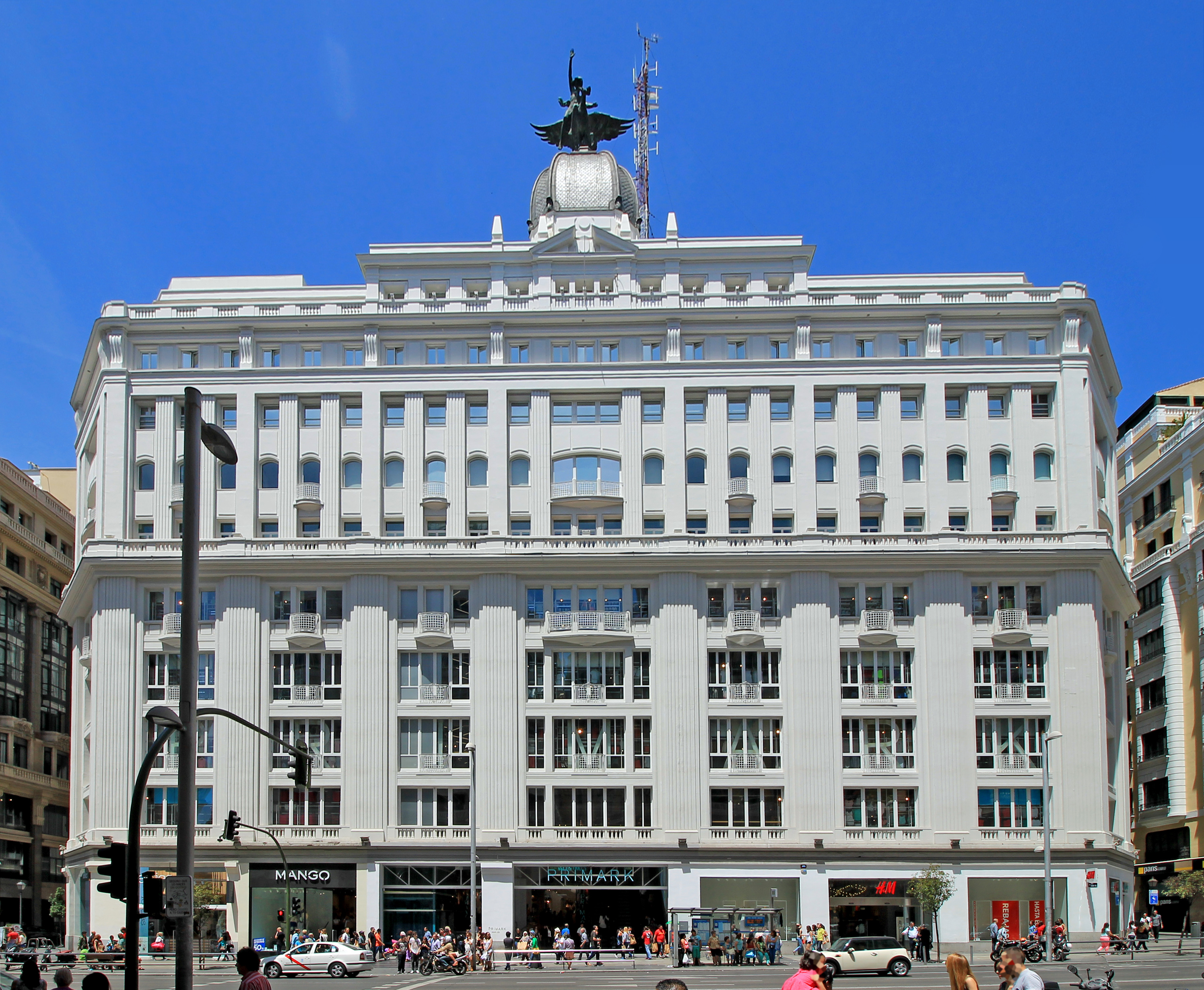

General information
- Location: Madrid, Spain

Design and construction
- Architect(s): Teodoro de Anasagasti

The Gran Vía 32 Building, also known as the Madrid-Paris Building, is a commercial building in Madrid which occupies the largest block of Gran Vía. Besides Gran Vía, it also borders the streets Mesonero Romanos, Desengaño and Gonzalo Jiménez de Quesada. The building was built in the second decade of the 20th century and signed by Teodoro de Anasagasti on an original idea by French architect Gaston Braive.

The structure was originally built as the first department stores in Madrid, the Almacenes Madrid-París. The Societé d'Etudes et de Constructions ("Society for Studies and Construction") was assigned to carry out Anasagasti's plans. The works began in 1921 and culminated, more than six months behind schedule, in January 1924, when the Madrid-Paris Department Store was inaugurated by kings Victoria Eugenia and Alfonso XIII. In 1934 it underwent the first remodeling but still maintained its outside appearance. In 1956 the architect Fernando Cánovas del Castillo made the most profound transformation by raising two new floors and removing the side domes, and crowned the building with the sculpture of the phoenix.

In 1988, the PRISA media group commissioned architect Miguel de Oriol to renovate the top floors where Cadena SER had their offices; a year later the works were finished and PRISA bought the entire building from La Unión and El Fénix Español (owned by the Banesto group). In 2008, the PRISA Group sold the property to a consortium led by Drago Capital and the Royal Bank of Scotland (RBS). In 2011, RBS sold its stake to Drago Capital and the Canadian fund PSP. Some time later, a profound remodeling work recovered the building's initial commercial use, and put the great central courtyard, the vault and even the imperial staircase in value. In 2015, Drago Capital sold the building to the Pontegadea Group equity company.

Since autumn of 2015 the Gran Vía 32 Building houses the flagship store of Primark in Spain.

== Description ==
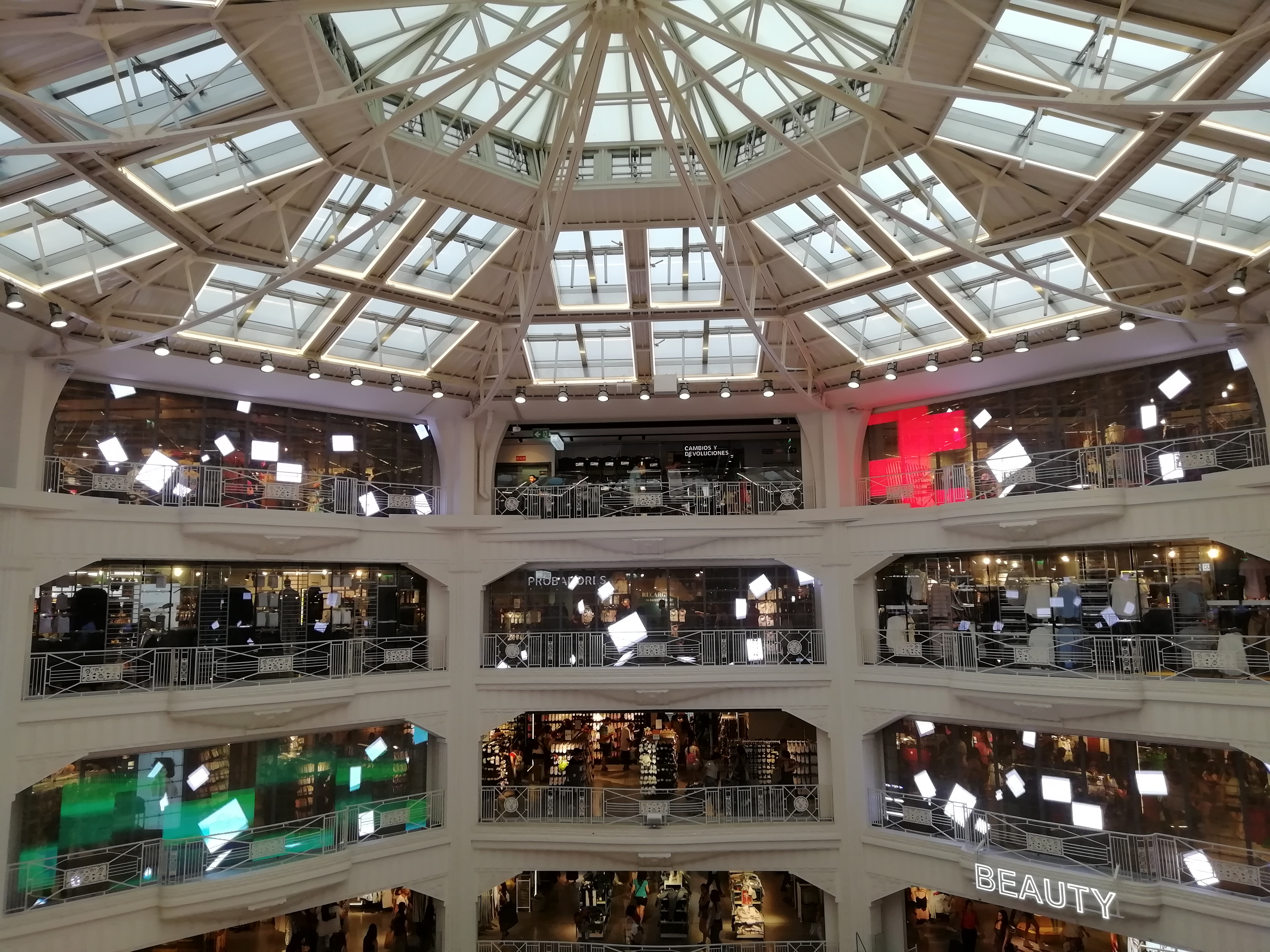
Interior of Primark department store in Gran Vía, July 2019

The building is avant-garde in its conception, in its design, in the materials and in its use. In the 1920s, the buildings in Gran Vía were built in the classic way (i.e. brick load-bearing walls and non-cast metal pillars) as well as others with modern technology such as Gran Vía 32, which was raised with reinforced concrete and following the principles coming from France for this type of constructions for department stores. The interior distribution pivoted around a large central octagonal covered lightwell, rising up from the ground floor to the fourth. The sales area occupied the first three floors, the ground floor and part of the basement. The public entrance was arranged through two large doors located on the chamfers of Gran Vía and a smaller central one, protected by arcades.
