= La Gran Peña =

- La Gran Peña
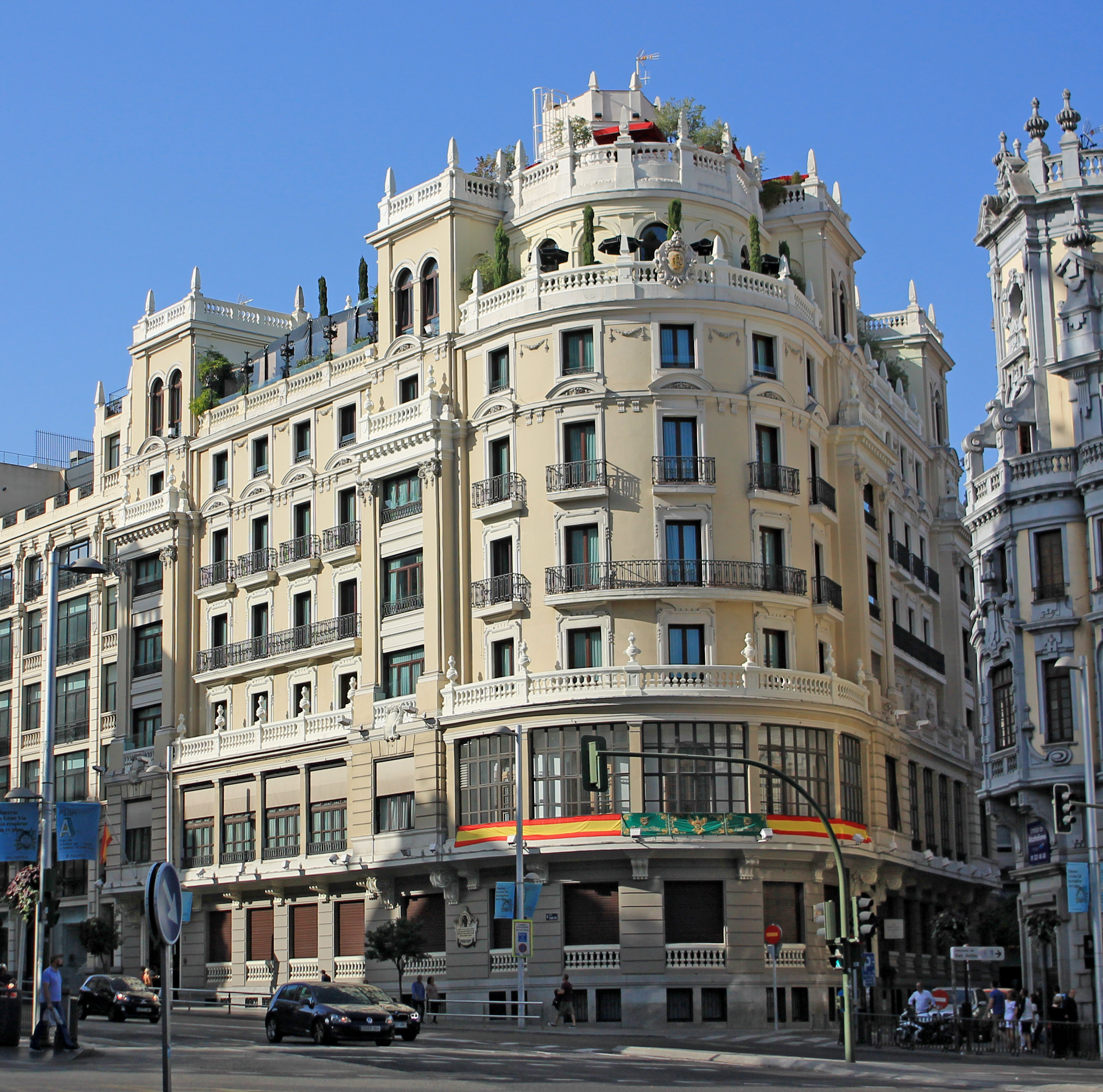
- Interactive map of the La Gran Peña area

General information
- Architectural style: Eclecticism
- Location: Madrid, Spain

La Gran Peña (also known as el Círculo de la Gran Peña) is a private community centre located in the building on Gran Vía 2 in Madrid. The community was created in 1869 by the Spanish military. Presidents of the institution are usually high-ranking military personnel or members of the Grandee. Politicians like José Canalejas, José Calvo Sotelo, as well as royals as Alfonso XIII, and since 1975 Juan Carlos I, are among the most illustrious club members.

The building was designed by architects Eduardo Gambra Sanz and Antonio de Zumárraga in November 1914, just when Gran Vía was being built. Nowadays, it also hosts a 5-star hotel, although its entrance is located on the side street Calle del Marqués de Valdeiglesias.

== History ==
The Real Gran Peña was initially founded by a group of Spanish soldiers from the General Staff and the Army Corps of Engineers who held a gathering at the Café Suizo in Madrid. In 1914, during the construction of the first section of Gran Vía, the building at number 2 (Avenida del Conde Peñalver 25 at the time) was prepared for La Peña. It was inaugurated on May 25, 1916 by the kings of Spain Alfonso XIII and Victoria Eugenia. and set on the first floors of the building. The headquarters of the Real Automóvil Club, the Institute of Civil Engineers, as well as private homes, occupied the remaining floors.

In 1931 there were worker revolts and protests in front of the premises. The headquarters remained closed during the first years of the Second Republic. Later in the Civil War, during the defense of Madrid, the building was seized and occupied. In 2010 a hotel was established in part of the property.
