= Church of San José (Madrid) =

- Iglesia de San José (Spanish)
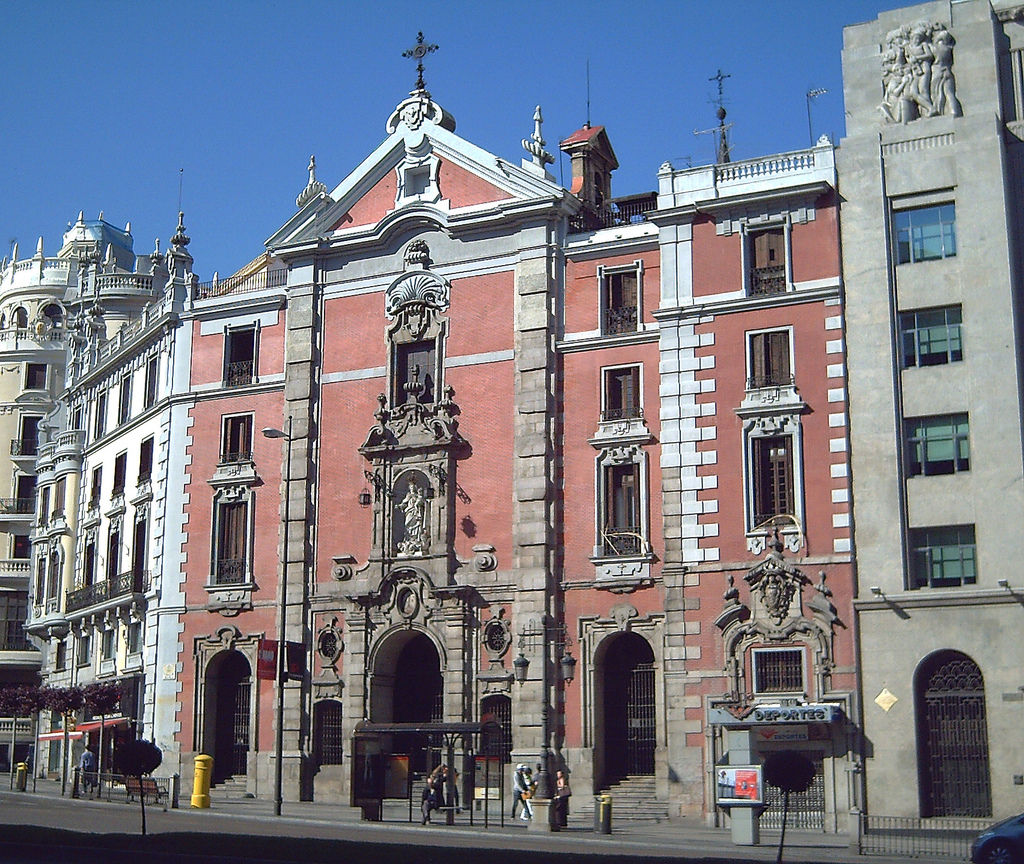

- Location within Spain
- 40.419068°N 3.696654°W
- Location: Madrid, Spain

Spanish Cultural Heritage
- Official name: Iglesia de San José
- Type: Non-movable
- Criteria: Monument
- Designated: 1995
- Reference no.: RI-51-0009137

The Church of San José (Spanish: Iglesia de San José) is a church located on the Calle de Alcalá in Madrid, Spain. The church in the past belonged to the former convent of San Hermenegildo, established in 1586 by Friar Nicolás de Jesús y María. The church was declared Bien de Interés Cultural in 1995.

== See also ==
- Catholic Church in Spain
- List of oldest church buildings
