= Casa de las Bolas =

Coordinates: 40.4246°N 3.6769°W

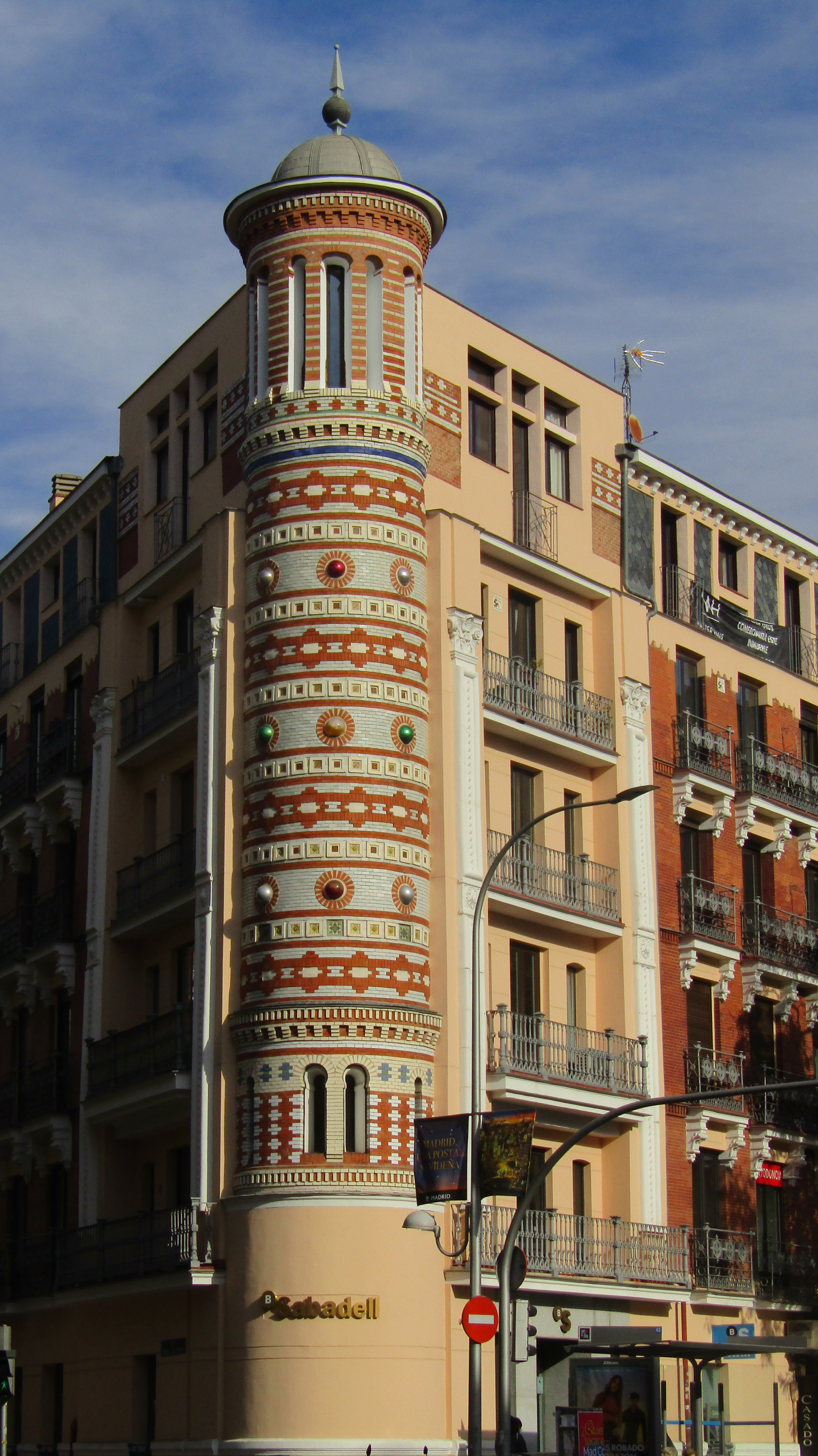
- Interactive map of the Casa de las Bolas area

General information
- Location: 145 Alcalá Street, Madrid, Spain

Height
- Architectural: Neo-Mudéjar

Design and construction
- Architect: Julián Marín

The Casa de las Bolas is a building located at Calle de Alcalá 145, itself located in the Salamanca district of Madrid. The building was planned by Julián Marín, the architect of Madrid Moderno, and was built between 1885 and 1895. It was amplified and reformed by Luis Sainz de los Terreros Gómez from 1905 to 1906. The entire Casa de las Bolas was rehabilitated in the 90s. It is a block of buildings with different owners.

== Architectural style ==
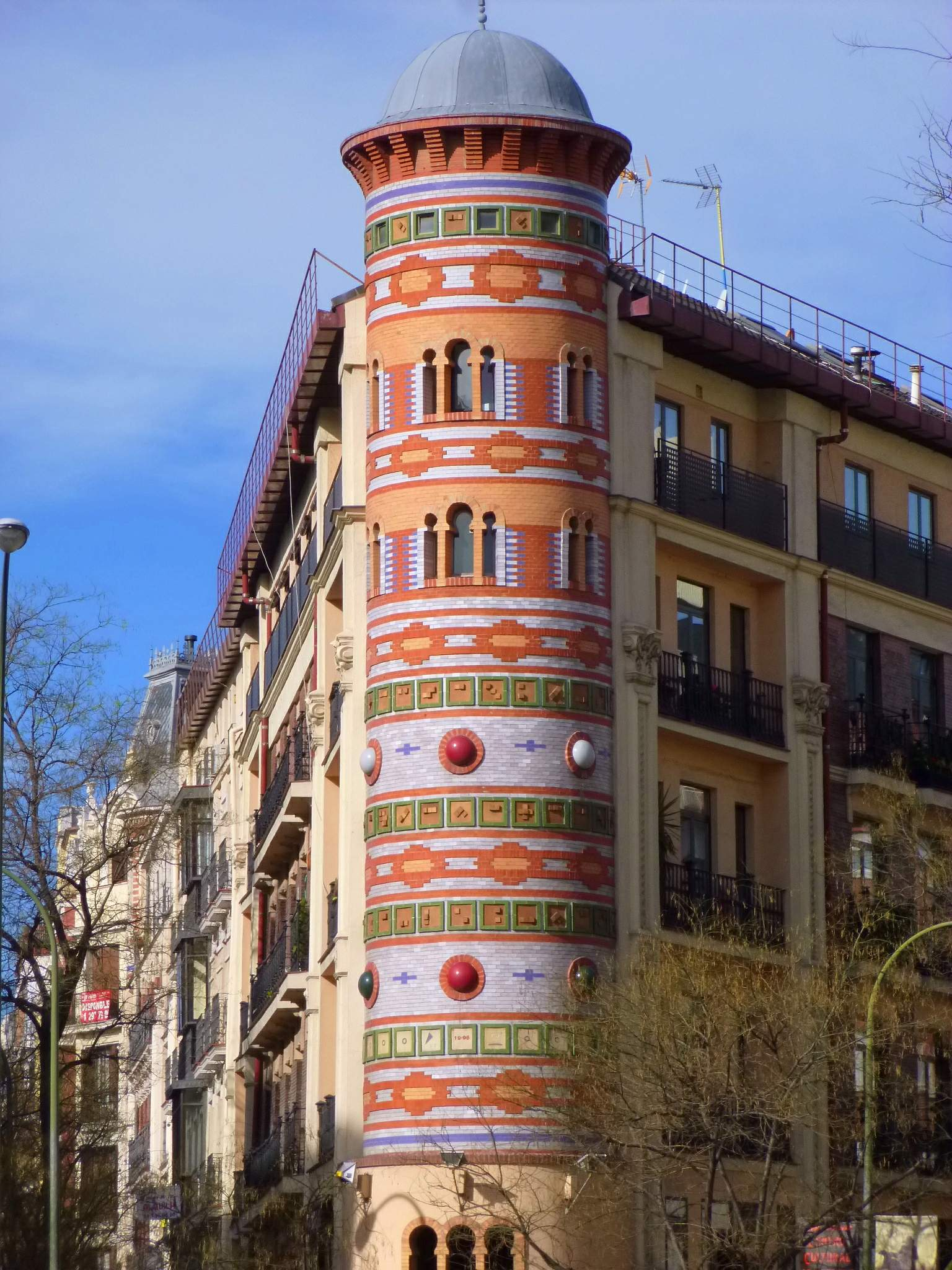
The second tower of the Casa.

It is located between Calle de Alcalá, Calle de Goya and Calle del General Díaz Porlier. It is a group of buildings arranged in a triangular fashion, with two circular towers of neo-mudéjar style. Both towers are inspired in the old plaza de toros of Goya, which was closed after the opening of Las Ventas, being replaced by the Palacio de los Deportes. The towers are made out of multi-colored bricks and policromed tiles. There are silvered spheres that are incrusted in it, which give it its namesake, Bolas meaning "balls" in Spanish.

== Gallery ==
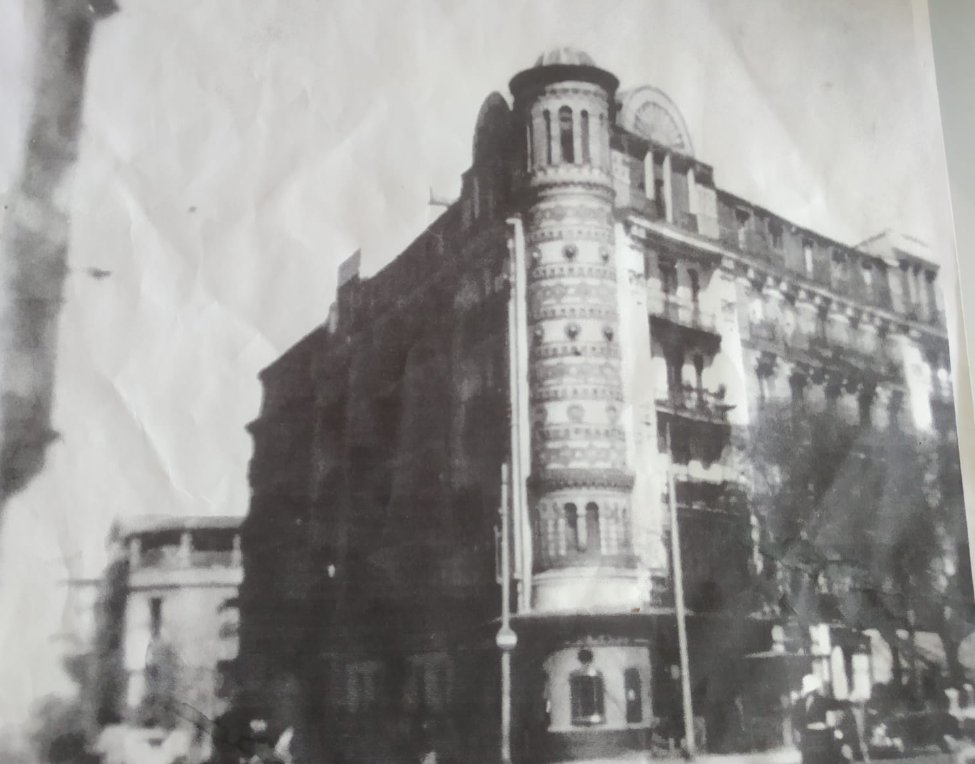
The Casa in the 1920s

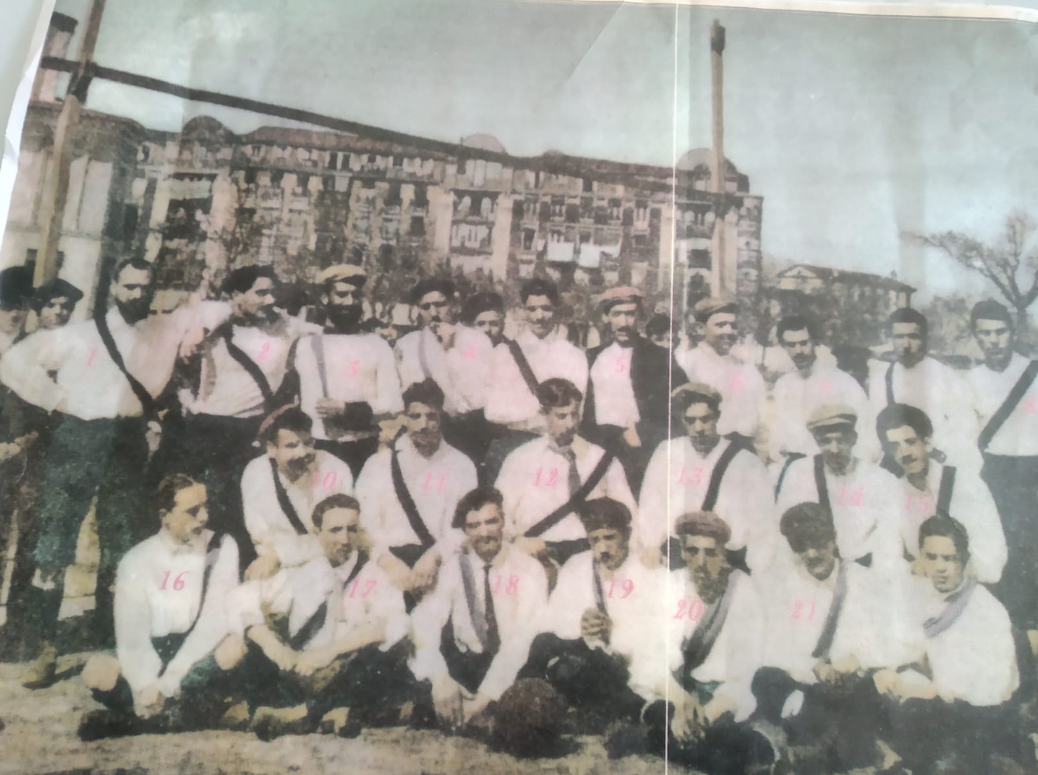
Real Madrid team. Their stadium was located just next to the building, visible in the photograph.

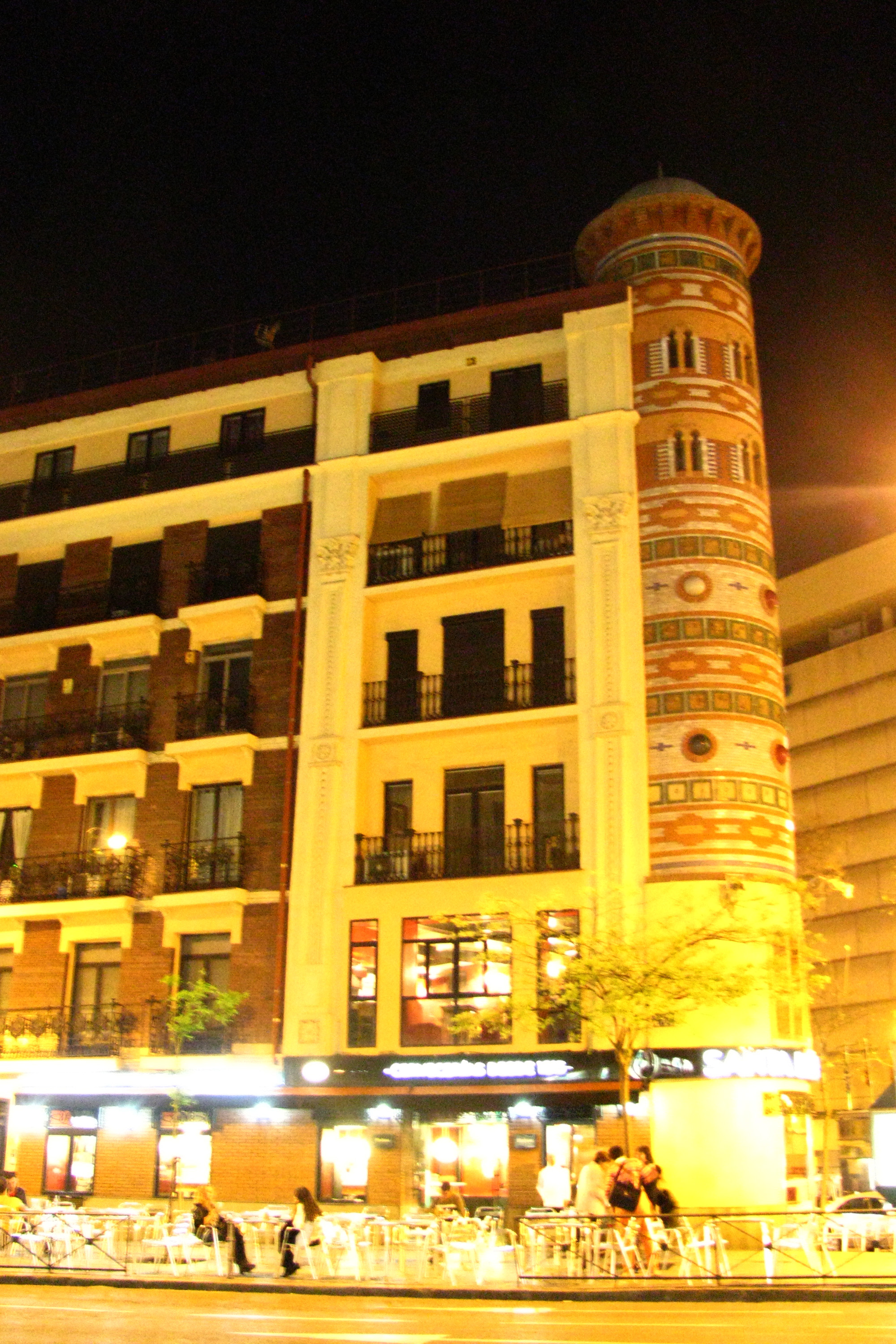
At night

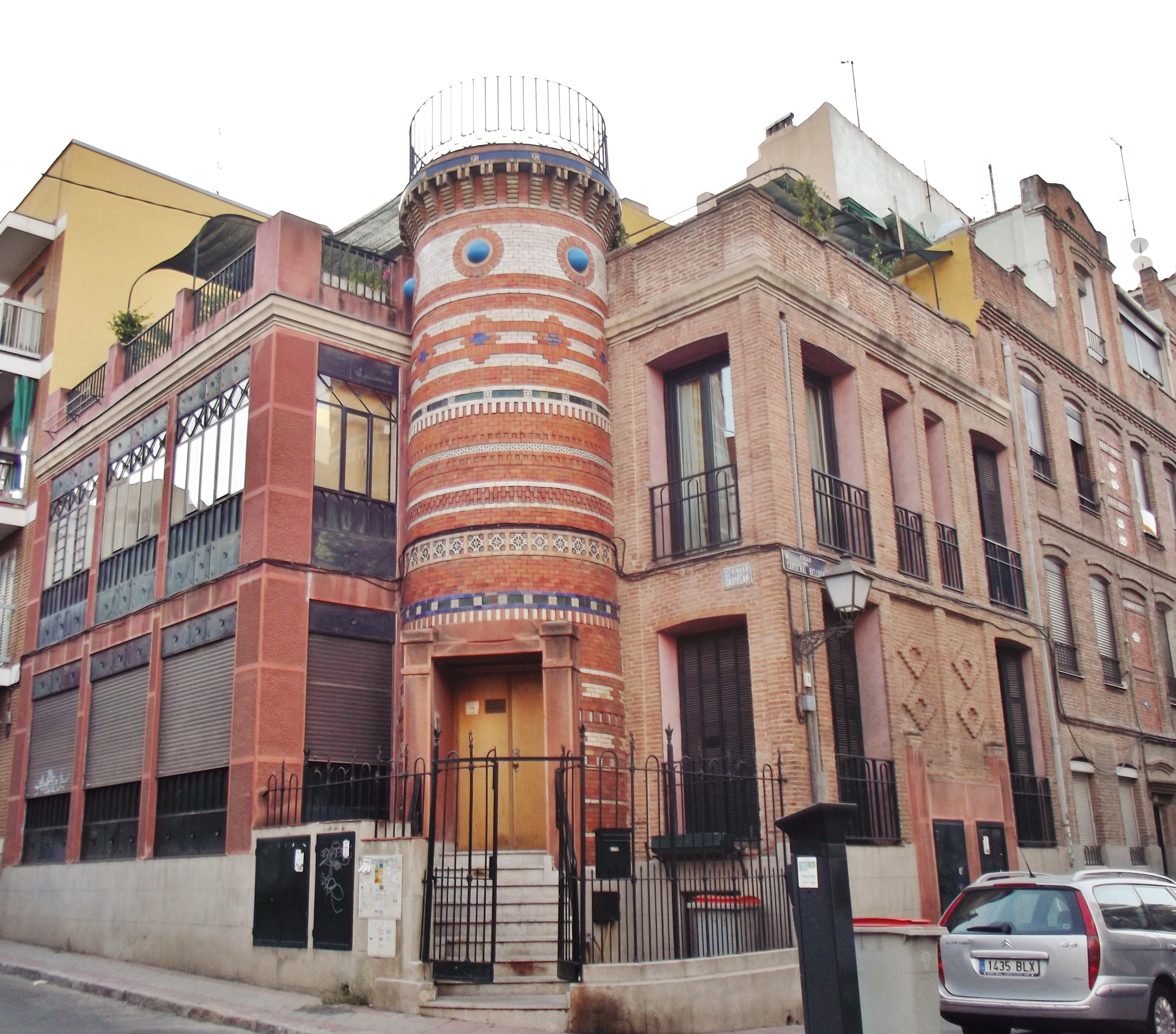
A tower inspired by the building.

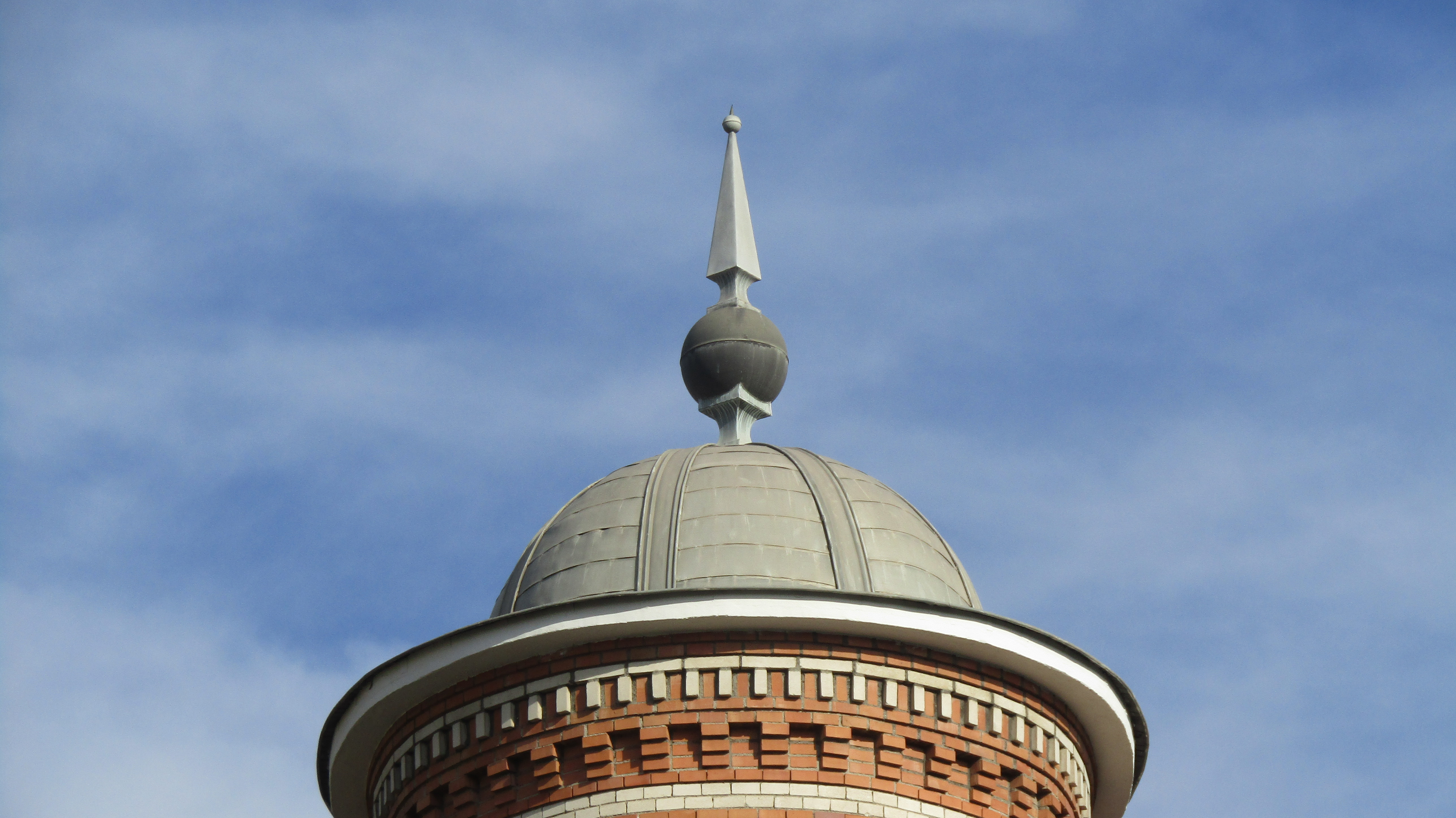
The top of one of the towers.
