= Fénix Directo =

- Company type: Public
- Industry: insurance
- Founded: 1991
- Headquarters: Madrid, Spain
- Products: vehicle insurance
- Owner: Allianz
- Website: www.fenixdirecto.com

Fénix Directo was a Spanish insurance company specialising in selling motor insurance over the telephone and via the internet. Its headquarters are in Madrid (Spain) and it is particularly well known in the Spanish market.

== History ==
The company has its origins in the Spanish insurance company La Unión y el Fénix which has a history that goes back to 1864. In 1991 a dedicated motor insurance subsidiary was established with the name of Fénix Autos.

In 1995, as a result of the merger between AGF Assurances and La Unión y El Fénix, Fénix Autos changed its name Fénix Directo. After the merger in 1999 with the German insurance group and supplier of financial services Allianz, Fénix Directo became a member of one of the largest insurance groups in the world.
