= Peñalver =

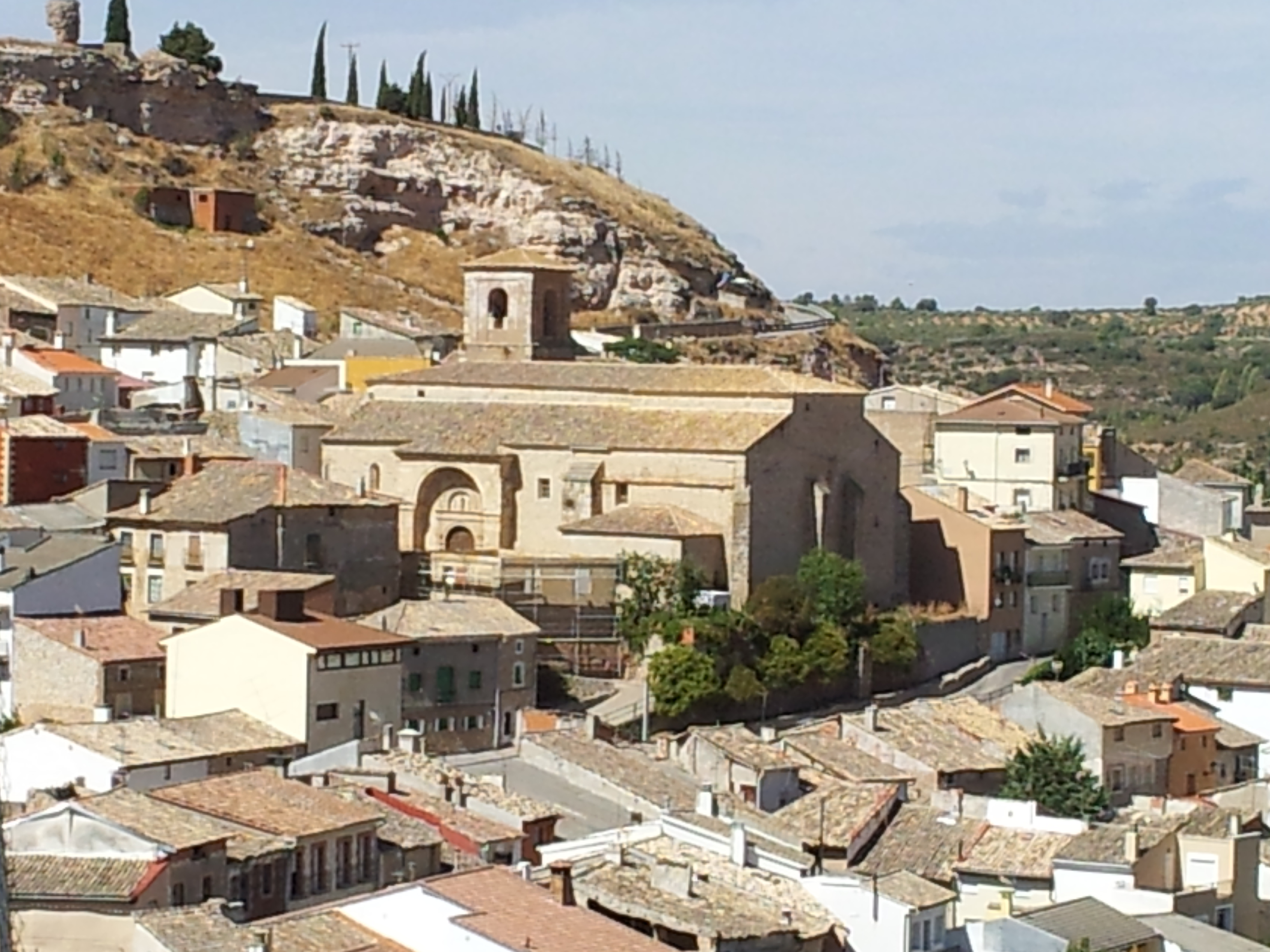

- Flag Coat of arms

- Location within Province of Guadalajara Location within Castilla-La Mancha Location within Spain
- Coordinates: 40°34′58″N 2°53′17″W
- Country: Spain
- Autonomous community: Castile-La Mancha
- Province: Guadalajara
- Comarca: La Alcarria

Government
  - Mayor: Jose Ángel Parra Mínguez

Area
  - Total: 81.31 km^{2} (31.39 sq mi)
- Elevation: 950 m (3,120 ft)

Population (2025-01-01)
  - Total: 172
  - Density: 2.12/km^{2} (5.48/sq mi)
- Demonym: Peñalveros
- Time zone: UTC+1 (CET)
  - Summer (DST): UTC+2 (CEST)
- Postal code: 19134
- Website: Official website

Peñalver is a municipality located in the province of Guadalajara, Castile-La Mancha, Spain.

The main activities are agriculture and the production of honey.
