= Calle de Alcalá =

Historic street in Madrid, Spain

Coordinates: 40°25′42″N 3°40′4″W

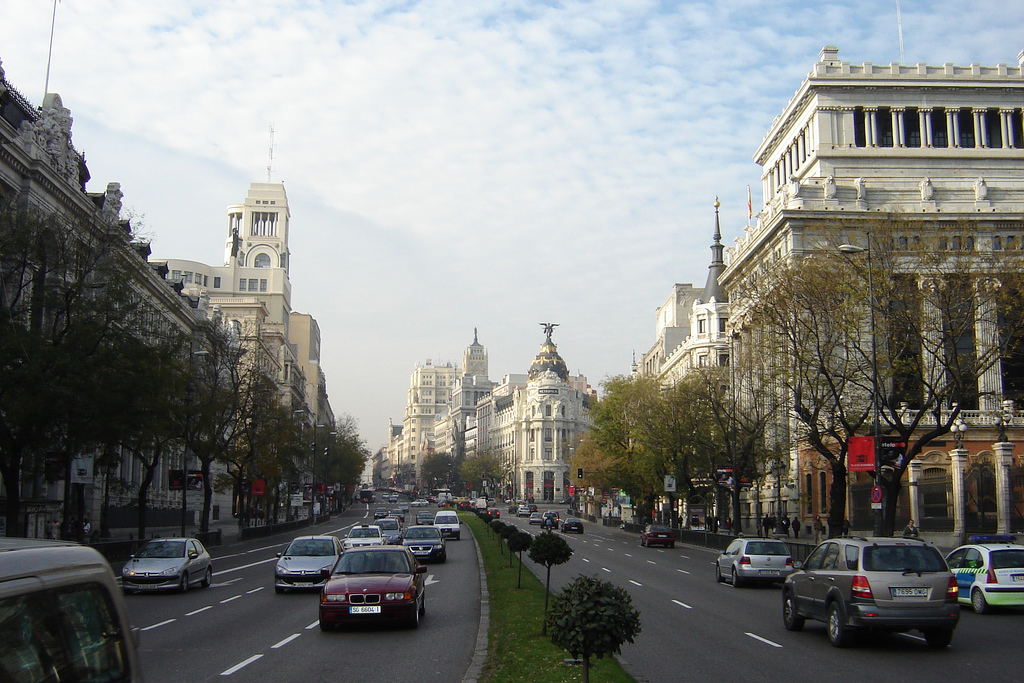
- Calle de Alcalá with the Edificio Metrópolis, the Círculo de Bellas Artes and the La Unión y el Fénix Español building in the background
- Interactive map of Calle de Alcalá
- Type: street
- Length: 11 km (6.8 mi)
- Location: Madrid, Spain
- West end: Puerta del Sol
- Major junctions: M-30

- East end: M-14 in Rejas

Calle de Alcalá is among the longest streets in Madrid. It starts at the Puerta del Sol and goes on for 11 kilometres (6.8 mi), to the northeastern outskirts of the city. Henry David Inglis described it in 1837 as "long, of superb width, and flanked by a splendid range of unequal buildings".

== History and landmarks ==
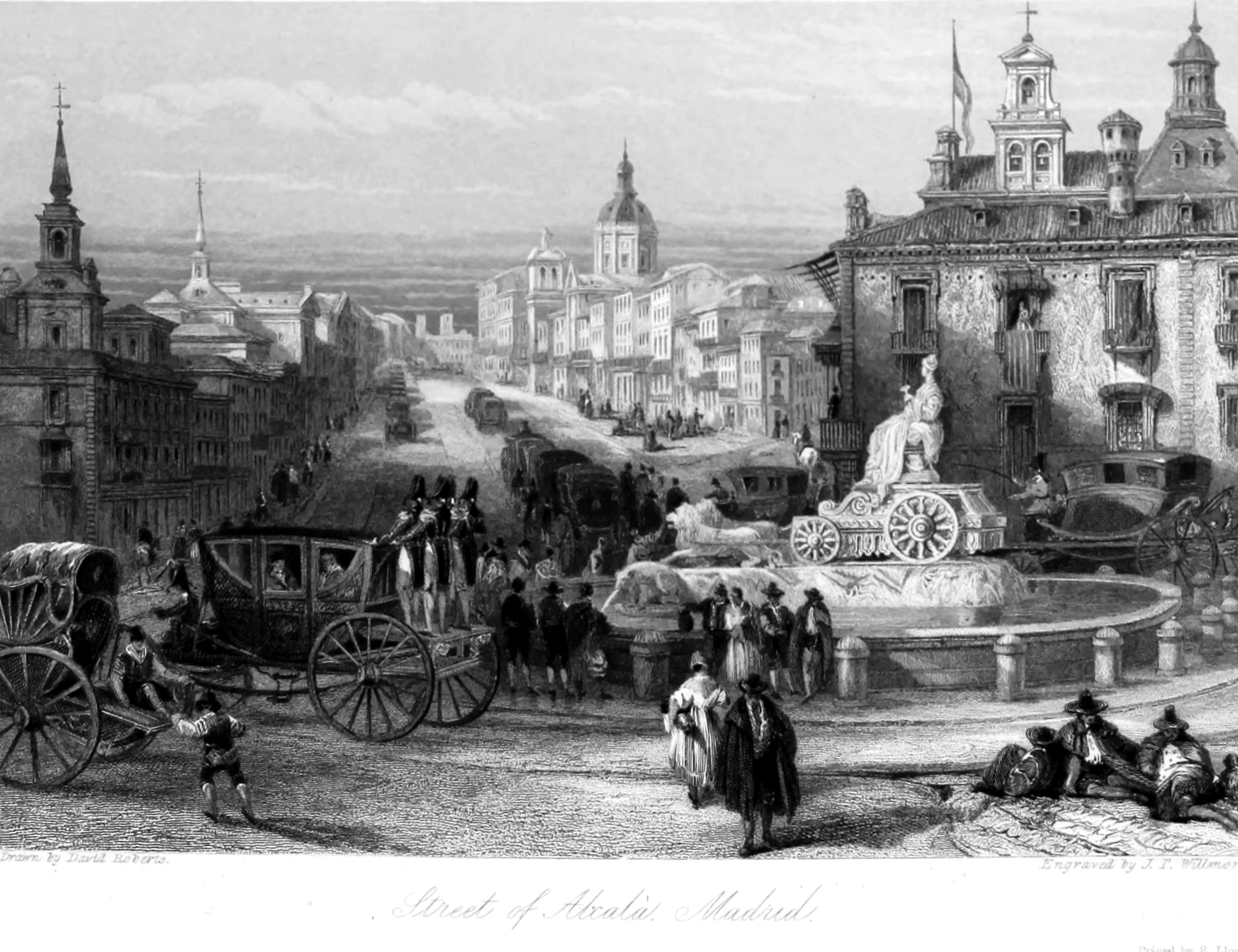
The street and the Fountain of Cybele depicted by David Roberts (c. 1838)

Calle de Alcalá is one of the oldest streets in the city. It was the old road which led to the city of Alcalá de Henares (from which it takes the name) and continued to Aragón; today, this route is covered by the A-2 motorway.

== Notable buildings ==
- Teatro Alcázar
- Teatro Apolo
- Banco Bilbao Vizcaya
- Banco de España
- Banco Mercantil e Industrial de Madrid
- Buen Retiro Park
- Casino de Madrid
- Centro Comercial Alcalá Norte
- Círculo de Bellas Artes
- Convento de la Natividad y San José
- Edificio de Las Cariátides
- Edificio del Banco de España
- Edificio Metrópolis
- Estación de Banco de España
- Fonda Peninsulares
- Café de Fornos
- Convento de San Hermenegildo
- Casa de los Heros
- Four Seasons Hotel Madrid
- Iglesia de las Calatravas
- Iglesia de San José (Madrid)
- Iglesia de San Manuel y San Benito
- Las Ventas
- Ministry of Education
- Palacio de Alcañices
- Palacio de Buenavista
- Palacio de Linares
- Palacio de Torrecilla
- Plaza de Cibeles
- Plaza de la Independencia
- Puerta de Alcalá
- Real Academia de Bellas Artes de San Fernando
- Real Casa de la Aduana
- Real Pósito de Madrid
- Casa de las Bolas
