= Revolver (disambiguation) =

A revolver is a type of firearm.

Revolver may also refer to:

== Film and television ==
- Revolver (1973 film), an Italian film directed by Sergio Sollima
- Revolver (1978 TV series), a British music series presented by Peter Cook
- Revolver (1992 film), a television film featuring Robert Urich
- Revolver (2001 TV series), a British TV comedy sketch show featuring John Inman
- Revolver (2005 film), a British film directed by Guy Ritchie
- Revolver Entertainment, a UK film distributor

== Literature ==
- Revolver (DC Comics), a 2010 graphic novel published by DC Vertigo
- Revolver (Fleetway comics), a 1990–1991 British comic
- Revolver (magazine), a rock music publication
- Revolver (novel), a 2009 young adult novel by Marcus Sedgwick
- "The Revolver", an 1895 short story by Emilia Pardo Bazán
- Revolver, a 1985–1986 Renegade Press comic pencilled by Steve Ditko
- RevolveЯ Quarterly, a comic and website by Salgood Sam

== Music ==
=== Albums ===
- Revolver (Beatles album), 1966
- Revolver (EP), a comedy album by Lewis Black, 2002
- Revolver (The Haunted album), 2004
- Revolver (T-Pain album), 2011

=== Groups and labels ===
- Revolver (British band), a 1990–1994 guitar group
- Revolver (French band), a pop rock band formed in 2006
- Revolver Music, a British record label
- Revolution Records (Canada), issued recordings as "Revolver".

=== Songs ===
- "Revolver" (song), by Madonna featuring Lil Wayne, 2009
- "Revolver", by the Donnas from Gold Medal, 2004
- "Revolver", by Hooverphonic from A New Stereophonic Sound Spectacular, 1996
- "Revolver", by Rage Against the Machine from Evil Empire, 1996
- "Revolver", by Usher from Here I Stand, 2008
- "Revolver", by Warehouse Republic, with a video featuring Rachel Hurd-Wood, 2010

== Other uses ==
- Revolver (Ferris wheel) or Wheel of Dublin, formerly in Dublin, Ireland
- Revolver Gallery, an art gallery in Los Angeles, California, US
- Revolver Island, Antarctica
- Nord 2.231 to 2.305, nicknamed "Revolver", a series of French steam locomotives

== See also ==
- Revolve (disambiguation)
- Revolution (disambiguation)
- Rotation (disambiguation)
