= Central University of Madrid =

Former name of the Complutense University of Madrid (1943–1970)

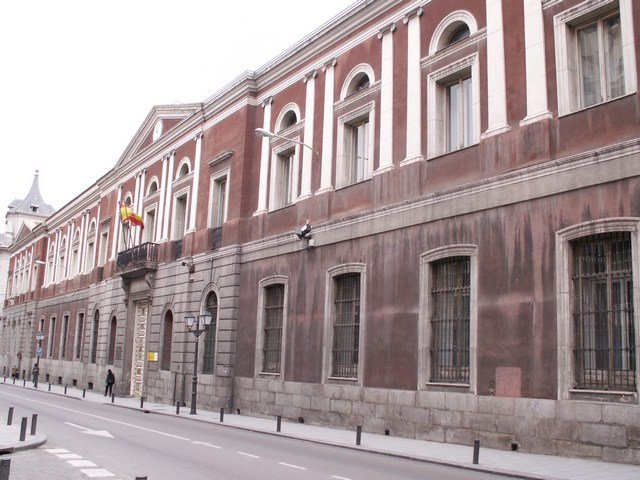
Buildings of the former Central University of Madrid and the Cardenal Cisneros Institute

The Central University and, later, the University of Madrid were predecessor institutions of the current Complutense University of Madrid.

== History ==
On October 3, 1822, the teachings of the Royal Studies of San Isidro and the Royal Museum of Natural Sciences of Madrid were integrated into a single institution. By royal decree of the Queen Regent of October 29, 1836, the transfer of the studies of the University of Alcalá to Madrid was decreed. The order provided for the transfer of nine professors to establish a provisional school of jurisprudence to be housed in the building that had been a seminary.

The University of Madrid may have originally been called the "Literary University." In 1850 or 1851 it was renamed "Central University", between 1943 and 1970 it was known as "University of Madrid", until finally adopting the name "Complutense University of Madrid".

The Central University has its origins in the liberal renewal mentality that sought to put an end to traditional teachings in the universities of the Ancien Régime. Initially, it was located in the building of the Nobles' Seminary on Princesa Street, and later moved to the convent of the New Salesian Sisters on San Bernardo Street. In 1842, the former Jesuit Novitiate was confirmed as the definitive location of the Central University. The first project to adapt the Novitiate to its new use as the Central University was by Francisco Javier Mariategui; After his death, he was replaced by Narciso Pascual y Colomer, who was responsible for the construction of the Paraninfo, built in 1852 using the walls of the former Jesuit church. Many faculties were distributed throughout Madrid in different buildings.

Since the Moyano Law (1857), this university was the only one in Spain authorized to award the doctorate, earning it the nickname "La Docta" (the Learned One), until 1954, when this authority was granted to the University of Salamanca, following the celebration of its 700th anniversary, and subsequently to the rest of the Spanish universities of the time.

Due to its historical relationship with the University of Alcalá—one of the institutions that merged to form the University of Madrid—it was unofficially nicknamed "La Complutense" during the Franco regime, a nickname legally incorporated into its name in 1970 to distinguish it from the Autonomous University of Madrid, founded in 1968.

From the end of Alfonso XIII's reign, on May 17, 1927, the project to build a University City began in the so-called Altos de la Moncloa, where the faculties were gradually relocated. By the 1960s, only the Faculty of Economics and Political Sciences remained in the Novitiate building.

In 1973, the Higher and Intermediate Technical Schools of Architecture and Engineering were spun off from this university and, together with other higher education institutions dependent on the Ministries of Defense, Industry, and Public Works, merged to form the Technical University of Madrid.
