= Symmetry group (disambiguation) =

The phrase symmetry group may refer to:

- symmetry group, the automorphisms of a mathematical object.
- symmetry in physics, symmetry groups which describe physical properties of particles and forces.
- symmetries of differential equations which form a Lie Group.

== See also ==
- Rotation (disambiguation)
- Symmetric group
