= Statue of Emilia Pardo Bazán (Madrid) =

Urban monument in Madrid

Emilia Pardo Bazán
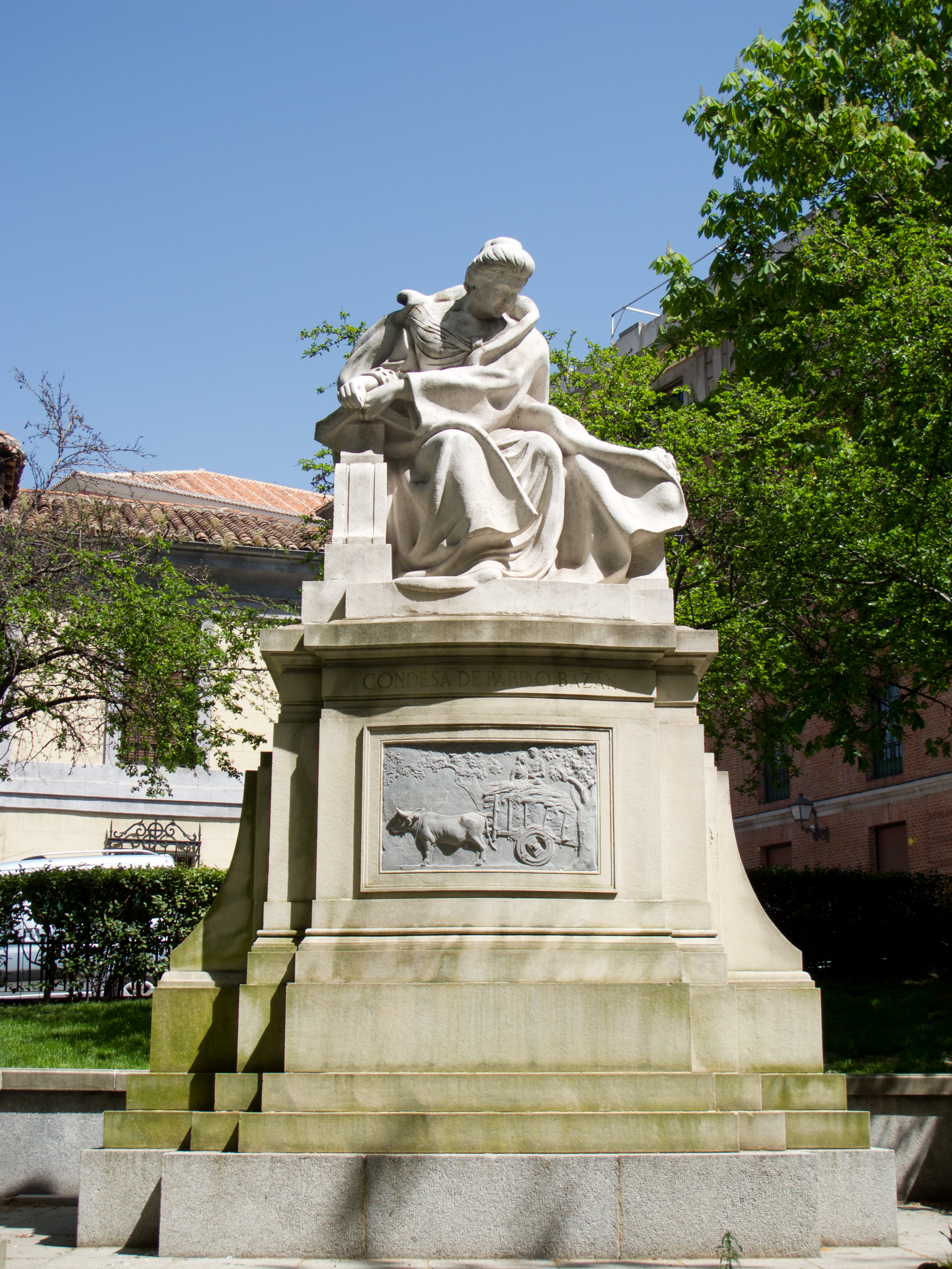
- 40.42631°N 3.712841°W
- Location: Calle de la Princesa, Madrid, Spain
- Designer: Rafael Vela (statue); Pedro Muguruza (plinth)
- Material: Limestone, marble, granite
- Opening date: 24 June 1926
- Dedicated to: Emilia Pardo Bazán

The Statue of Emilia Pardo Bazán is an instance of public art in Madrid, Spain. Located next to the calle de la Princesa, it is dedicated to Emilia Pardo Bazán.

== History and description ==
Following the death of Pardo Bazán in 1921, the first to come up with the idea of an homage to Pardo Bazán in Madrid was Eugenio Rodríguez Ruiz de la Escalera. The costs were funded—under the auspice of María del Rosario de Silva, the Duchess of Alba—via popular subscription from women from Spain and Argentina.

The statue—made of limestone and representing Pardo Bazán—was a work by Rafael Vela del Castillo, while the plinth was authored by Pedro Muguruza.

Erected next to the Palacio de Liria and close to Pardo Bazán's Madrilenian address at the calle de la Princesa, the monument was unveiled on 24 June 1926. The ceremony of inauguration was presided by King Alfonso XIII and Victoria Eugenie. Romanones, Blanca de Igual y Martínez Dabán (viscountess of Llanteno and Madrid municipal councillor) and Eduardo Callejo de la Cuesta (Minister of Public Instruction), intervened as speakers.

In March 2019, the district junta of Centro voted to name the surrounding gardens as Jardines de las Feministas ("Gardens of the Feminists").
