= Revolve =

Revolve may refer to:

== Music ==
- Revolve (Danger Danger album), 2009
- Revolve (John Newman album), 2015
- Revolve, a 2000 album by Beautiful Skin
- "Revolve", a 1995 song by the Melvins

== Other uses ==
- Revolve NTNU, a student motorsport organization at the Norwegian University of Science and Technology
- Revolve Theatre Company, Henley-on-Thames, Oxfordshire, UK

== See also ==
- Revolution (disambiguation)
- Revolver (disambiguation)
