= Emilia Pardo Bazán =

Spanish writer (1851–1921)

Doña Emilia Pardo Bazán Countess of Pardo Bazán
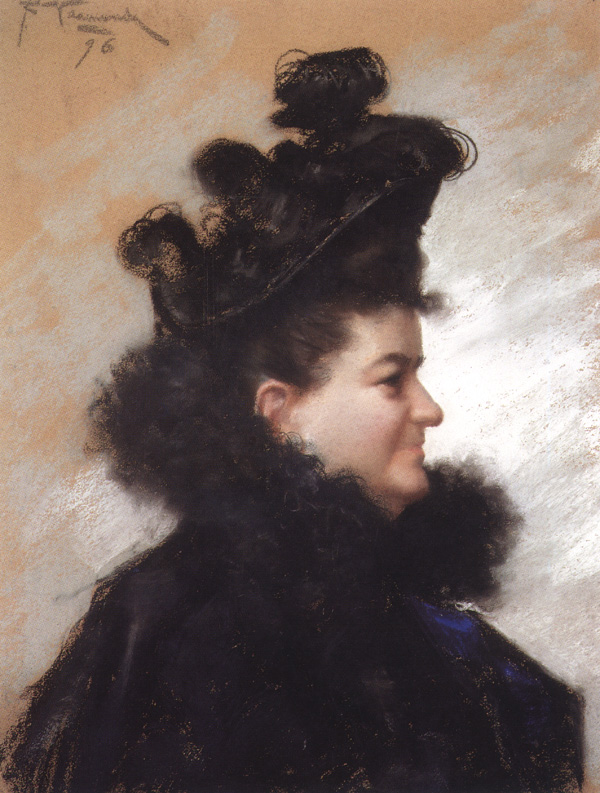
- Portrait by Joaquín Vaamonde Cornide (1896)
- Born: Emilia Pardo Bazán y de la Rúa-Figueroa; 16 September 1851; A Coruña, Spain
- Died: 12 May 1921 (aged 69); Madrid, Spain
- Occupations: Novelist; short story writer; journalist; critic; playwright; editor; translator
- Spouse: José Antonio de Quiroga y Pérez de Deza (m. 1867)
- Children: 3
- Writing career
- Period: 19th century
- Genre: Novel
- Literary movement: Realism; naturalism
- Coat of arms of the Countess of Pardo Bazán

Emilia Pardo Bazán y de la Rúa-Figueroa, Countess of Pardo Bazán (Spanish pronunciation: [eˈmilja ˈpaɾðo βaˈθan]; 16 September 1851 – 12 May 1921) was a Spanish novelist, journalist, literary critic, poet, playwright, translator, editor and professor.

Her naturalism and descriptions of reality, as well as her feminist ideas embedded in her work, made her one of the most influential and best-known female writers of her era. Her ideas about women's rights in education also made her a prominent feminist figure. She also addressed the history of Spain and its influence in contemporaneous politics, coining the term of the Spanish Black Legend.

== Life ==
=== Childhood and education ===
Emilia Pardo Bazán was born into an affluent noble family in A Coruña, Galicia, Spain. She was the only child of José Pardo Bazán y Mosquera and Amalia de la Rúa Figueroa y Somoza. The family's principal residence was in Rúa Tabernas but they also owned two other houses, one close to Sanxenxo and the other, known as the Pazo de Meirás, located in the outskirts of the city. Her father, believing in the intellectual equality of men and women, provided her with the best education possible, inspiring her life-long love for literature. She wrote her first poems at the age of nine. Emilia had access to a broad range of reading material in her father's library, later stating that among her favorites were Don Quijote de la Mancha, the Bible and the Iliad. Other early readings included La conquista de México by Antonio de Solís and Parallel Lives by Plutarch.

She was fascinated by books about the French Revolution. Her family would spend their winters in Madrid, where Emilia attended a French school sponsored by the Royal Family, and where she was introduced to the work of La Fontaine and Jean Racine. Her frequent visits to France would prove to be especially useful later in her life by helping her connect with the literary world of Europe and become familiar with important authors like Victor Hugo. When she was twelve her family decided to stop their winter visits to Madrid, staying in A Coruña where she studied with private tutors. She refused to follow the rules that limited women to just learning about music and home economics. She received formal education on all types of subjects, with an emphasis on the humanities and languages. She became fluent in French, English, and German. She was not permitted to attend college. Women were forbidden to study science and philosophy, but she became familiar with those subjects by reading and talking with friends of her father.

=== Marriage and literary career ===
At the age of sixteen, Pardo Bazán married Don José Antonio de Quiroga y Pérez de Deza, a country gentleman who was himself only eighteen and still a law student. The following year, 1868, saw the outbreak of the Glorious Revolution, resulting in the deposition of Queen Isabella II and awakening in Emilia an interest in politics. She is believed to have taken an active part in the underground campaign against Amadeo I of Spain and, later, against the republic.

In 1876 she won a literary prize offered by the municipality of Oviedo, for an essay entitled Estudio crítico de las obras del padre Feijoo (Critical Essay on the Works of Father Feijoo), the subject of her essay being a Benedictine monk. Emilia Pardo Bazán always had a great admiration for Feijoo, an eighteenth-century Galician intellectual, possibly due to his feminism avant la lettre. She also published her first book of poems in the same year, entitled Jaime in honor of her newborn son. This was followed by a series of articles in La Ciencia cristiana, a highly orthodox Roman Catholic magazine, edited by Juan Orti y Lara.

Her first novel, Pascual López: autobiografía de un estudiante de medicina (Pascual López: Autobiography of a Medical Student), which appeared in 1879, was written in a realist, romantic style. She was encouraged by its success and, two years later, she published Un viaje de novios (A Honeymoon Trip), in which an incipient interest in French naturalism can be observed, causing something of a sensation at the time. This was further fuelled by the appearance of La tribuna (1883), which was more heavily influenced by the ideas of Émile Zola and is widely considered to be the first Spanish naturalist novel. Her response to the critics' outrage was published in 1884 under the title La cuestión palpitante (The Critical Issue). Her husband did not feel strong enough to weather the ensuing social scandal created by a woman daring to express her views about such matters and two years later the couple began an amicable separation, Emilia living with their children while her husband took up residence in the Castle of Santa Cruz in A Coruña, which he had acquired at an auction. It was only after their separation that her relationship with the writer Benito Pérez Galdós blossomed into a full-blown intimate affair, which was to prove enduring.

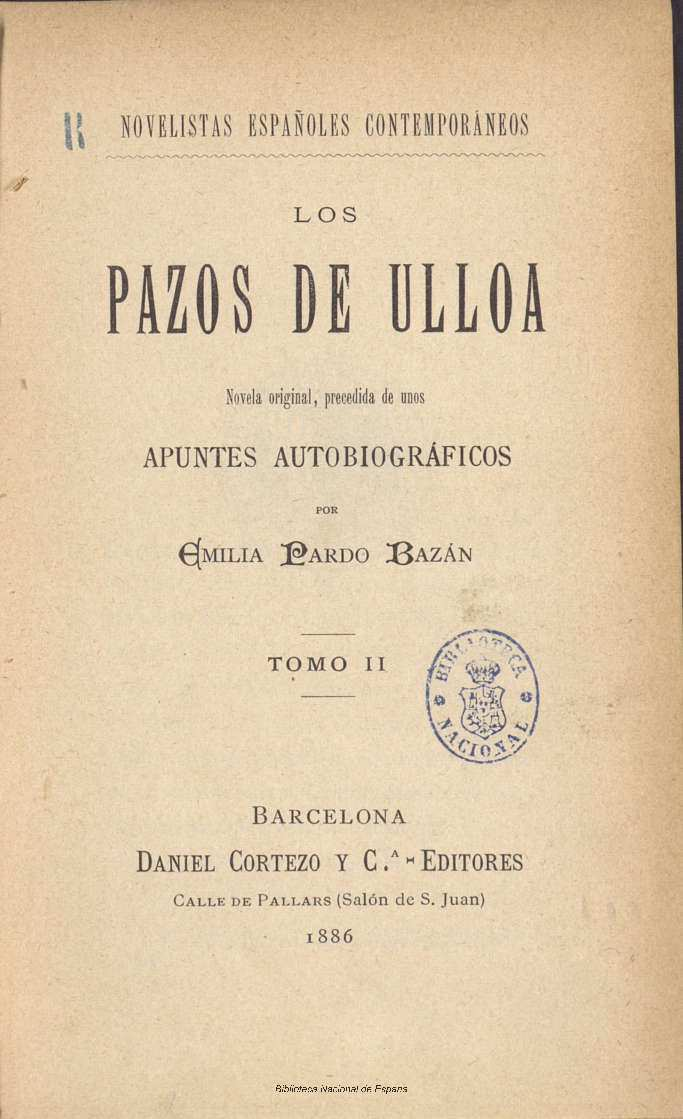
Los pazos de Ulloa, 1886. Volume II

1885 saw the publication of El Cisne de Vilamorta (The Swan of Vilamorta), in which the naturalist scenes are more numerous and more pronounced than in any of her previous works, although the author has been accused of shrinking from the logical application of her theories by inserting a romantic and inappropriate ending. Probably the best of Emilia Pardo Bazán's work is embodied in Los pazos de Ulloa (The House of Ulloa), published in 1886, which recounts the slide into decadence of an aristocratic family, as notable for the heroes Nucha and Julián as for characters including the political bravos, Barbacana and Trampeta. Yet perhaps its most abiding merit lies in its depiction of country life, the poetic realization of Galician scenery portrayed in an elaborate, colourful style. A sequel, with the significant title La madre naturaleza (Mother Nature), published in 1887, marked a further advance in the path of naturalism, and henceforth Pardo Bazán was universally recognized as one of the principal exponents of the new naturalistic movement in Spain, a role confirmed by the publication of Insolación (Sunstroke) and Morriña (Homesickness) in 1889. In this year her reputation as a novelist reached its highest point.

During her last years of writing, Emilia Pardo Bazán wrote many essays and gave lectures in renowned institutions. She also began to intervene in political journalism as well as fighting for the right of women to social and intellectual emancipation. Thus, around 1890, her work evolved towards greater symbolism and spiritualism.

In 1905 she published a play entitled Verdad (Truth), better known for its boldness than for its dramatic qualities. Her last novel, Dulce dueño (Sweet Master), was published in 1911, but she continued to write short stories like "El revólver" ("The Revolver"), publishing more than 600 over the course of her career.

=== Support for women's rights ===
Pardo Bazán was a standard bearer for women's rights and dedicated both her literary production and her life to their defense. In all of her works she incorporated her ideas on the modernization of Spanish society, on the need for female education and on women's access to all the rights and opportunities that men already enjoyed.

In 1882, she participated in a conference organized by the Free Educational Institution and openly criticized the education received by the Spanish women, in which values like passivity, obedience and submission to their husbands were relentlessly promoted.

In spite of the patent sexism in the intellectual circles of her era, Emilia Pardo Bazán became the first woman to preside over the literature section of the Ateneo de Madrid in 1906, and the first to occupy a chair of Neo-Latin literature at the Central University of Madrid (former name of the Complutense University of Madrid). She inherited the title of Countess on her father's death in 1908 and in 1910 was appointed a member of the Council of Public Instruction. In 1921 she was appointed to the Senate but never formally took up her seat. Much to her frustration, she was repeatedly refused a seat at the Spanish Royal Academy, purely on the grounds of her sex. She died in Madrid in 1921.

=== Spanish Black Legend ===
Her political work also crossed into the history of Spain, which according to her was a target of political instrumentalization from multiple factions. She named the concept of the Black Legend in Paris during her conference La España de ayer y la de hoy in Paris in 1899, a point commonly omitted in her biographies. Pardo Bazán, who had previously written in depth about historical figures like Hernán Cortés and Francisco Pizarro, addressed the existent term of the "Golden Legend", which she described as a complacent, self-destructive national fixation on Spain's past glories. She then coined that of "Black Legend", described in turn as another trend of thought, both domestic and foreign, which sought to undermine falsely the image of Spain in history. The term was later adopted by historian Julián Juderías, who was soon erroneously credited with its coining.

=== Racial determinism ===
According to Brian J. Dendle, her naturalism partially drinks from late 19th-century theories of racial heritage and atavism. She was well-versed in the racial theories applied to criminology by Cesare Lombroso. Featuring a Catholic ideological matrix close to Pidal y Mon, she espoused nonetheless racist views. She held antisemitic ideas, to the point of denigrating both Sephardic and Ashkenazi Jews. She tried to justify antisemitism in 1899 in the context of the Dreyfus affair in the pages of La Ilustración Artística: "The Dreyfus affair is nothing but an episode of the secular struggle that covered the Middle Ages in blood in the streets of Valencia and Toledo [...] The crusade against Dreyfus can be explained, and as it can be explained it can be partially justified".

=== Food writer ===
Fond of gastronomy, in 1905 Pardo Bazán prologued La cocina práctica ("the practical cuisine") by her friend Manuel Purga y Parga, aka Picadillo. She later wrote her own culinary works, such as La cocina española antigua (1913). She is credited as one of the food writers and gastronomes who joined the initiative for pushing forward the idea of the modern Spanish national cuisine in the early 20th century, recognisable by Spaniards as their own.

== Translations into English ==
- The House of Ulloa, translated by Paul O'Prey and Lucia Graves, Penguin Books, 1990
- Mother Nature, translated by Walter Borenstein, Bucknell University Press, 2010
- The Tribune of the People, translated by Walter Borenstein, Bucknell University Press, 1999
- The White Horse and Other Stories, translated by Robert M Fedorchek, Bucknell University Press, 2025
- Torn Lace and Other Stories, translated by Maria Cristina Urruela, Modern Language Association of America, 1997
- Take Six: Six Spanish Women Writers, edited and translated by Kathryn Phillips-Miles and Simon Deefholts, Dedalus Books, 2022: contains a selection of stories by Emilia Pardo Bazán in English translation not included in previous anthologies.

== Tribute ==
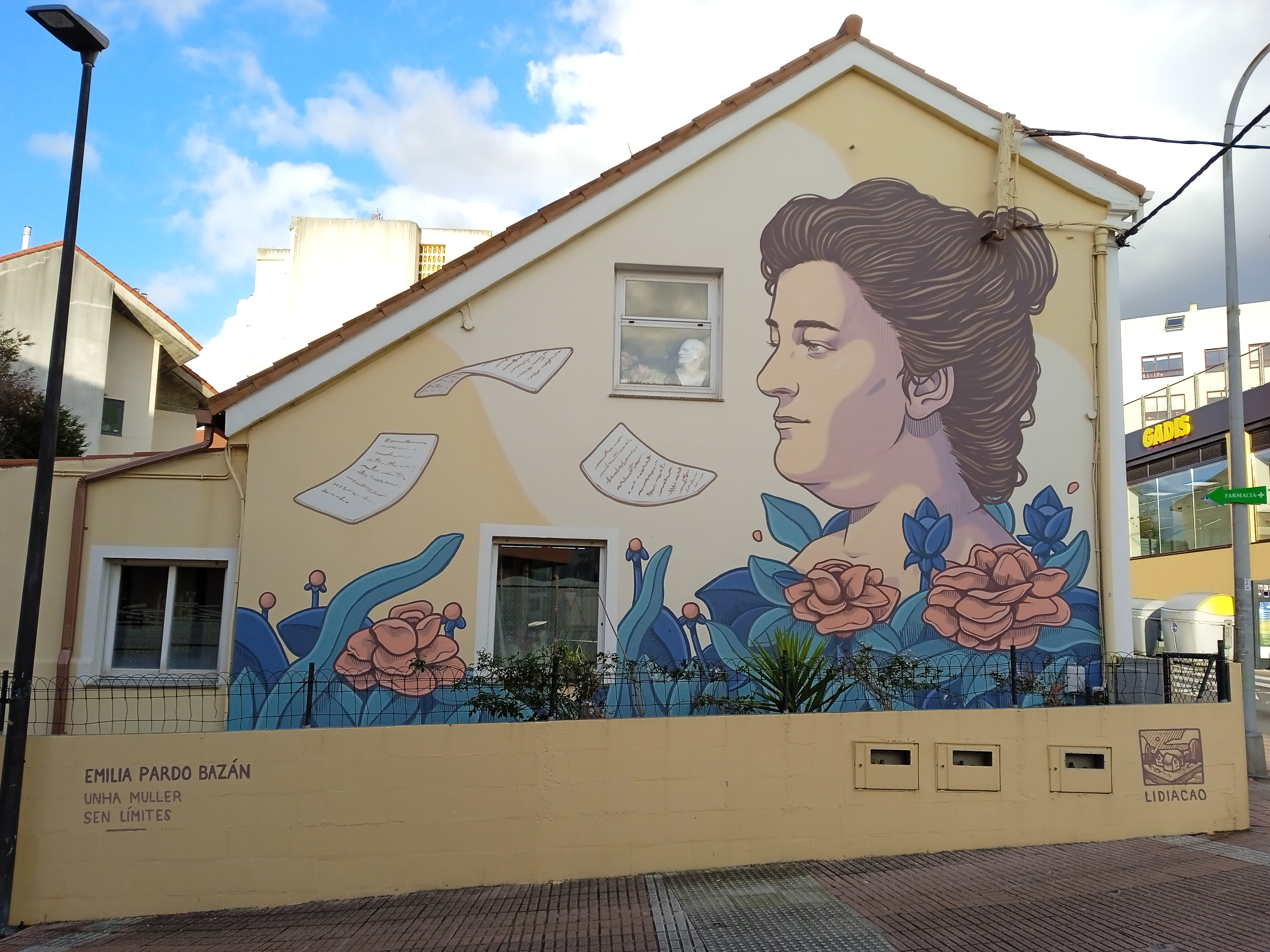
Emilia Pardo Bazán mural in Oleiros, (Galicia).

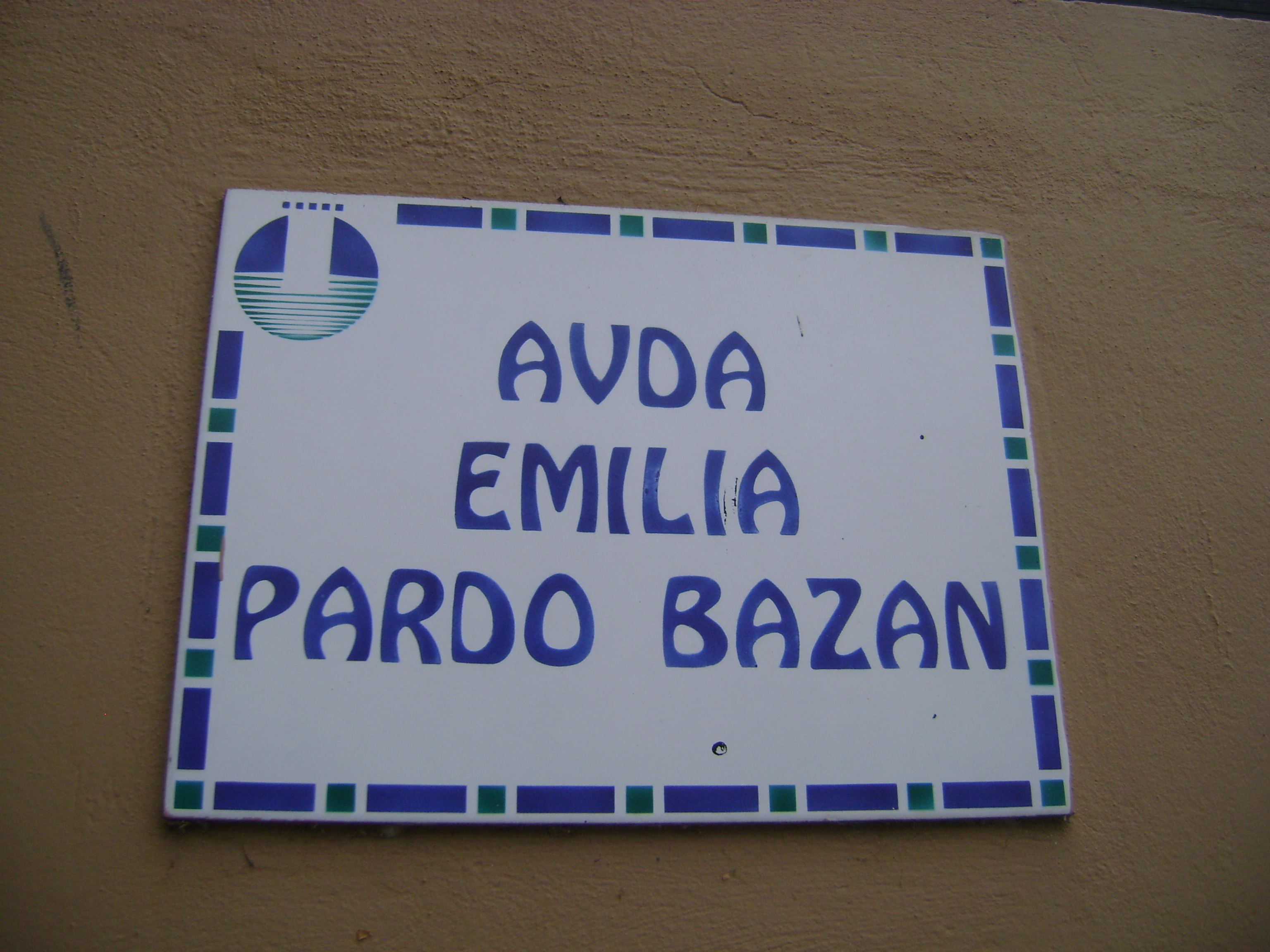
Emilia Pardo Bazán avenue in Oleiros.

A statue dedicated to Pardo Bazán was unveiled in Madrid on 24 June 1926. She has also appeared on the postage of Spain, specifically a 15-peseta stamp issued in 1972.

On 16 September 2017, Google celebrated her 166th birthday with a Google Doodle.
