= Rotator =

Rotator may refer to

== Anatomy ==
- Anatomical terms of motion §Rotation
- List of internal rotators of the human body
- List of external rotators of the human body

== Other uses ==
- Antenna rotator, a device used to change the orientation, within the horizontal plane, of a directional antenna
- Field rotator or Clock drive, a mechanism to move a telescope to keep the aim in exact sync with the apparent motion of the fixed stars
- Kicked rotator, a prototype model for chaos and quantum chaos studies
- Polarization rotator, an optical device that rotates the polarization axis of a linearly polarized light beam by an angle of choice
  - Faraday rotator, a polarization rotator based on the Faraday effect
- Rotator (album), a 1996 album by Danish rock band Dizzy Mizz Lizzy
- Rotator truck, a type of tow truck with a rotating extendible boom

== See also ==
- List of fast rotators (minor planets)
- List of slow rotators (minor planets)
- Rotation (disambiguation)
