= La madre naturaleza (novel) =

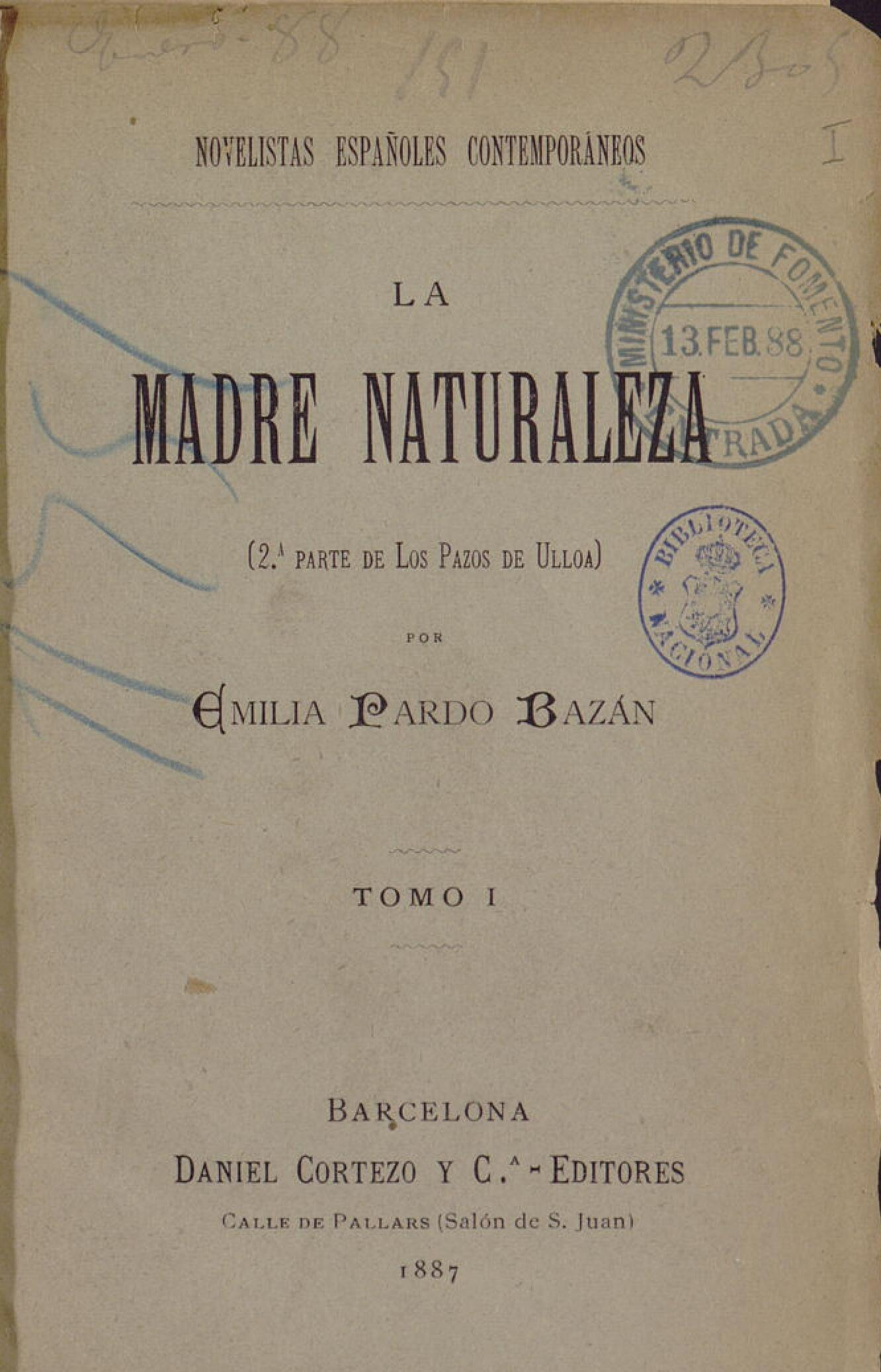
- Cover of the first volume of the first edition, 1887
- Author: Emilia Pardo Bazán
- Language: Spanish
- Genre: Realist novel
- Publisher: Daniel Cortezo y Cía.
- Publication date: 1887
- Publication place: Spain
- Preceded by: The House of Ulloa

La madre naturaleza is a novel by Emilia Pardo Bazán, published in 1887.

At the time of its publication, the novel was regarded as one of the most orthodox examples of Naturalism in Spain, despite its differences from the theories of Émile Zola. It has thematic and chronological continuity with Pardo Bazán's earlier novel The House of Ulloa, serving as the conclusion to the story of its characters.

== Plot ==
La madre naturaleza continues the story of the previous novel. Pardo Bazán employs a more poetic and descriptive prose style, particularly in her depictions of the Galician countryside. The novel develops the characters of Perucho and Manuela and introduces Gabriel Pardo. Its central theme is the conflict between nature and culture, particularly the tension between natural impulses and religious and social norms. Perucho and Manuela, who are half-siblings without initially knowing their relationship, fall in love and ultimately succumb to their feelings.

== Characters ==
- Julián is the parish priest who links the novel with The House of Ulloa and plays a central role in its conclusion. He represents Pardo Bazán's concept of Christian Naturalism, in which culture and religion are presented as forces capable of opposing uncontrolled nature.
- Gabriel Pardo is the brother of Nucha and the uncle of Manuela. His arrival at the Pazos marks the point at which the main action of the novel begins, and he can be regarded as its principal protagonist.
- Manuela and Perucho are half-siblings who are initially unaware of their relationship. Perucho is the son of the marquis and the servant Sabela, while Manuela is the daughter of the marquis and his legitimate wife Nucha. They fall in love and only later discover their kinship. Perucho leaves, while Manuela withdraws to a convent at Julián's urging.

== Style and themes ==
The novel is notable for Pardo Bazán's detailed descriptions of the Galician landscape, reflecting her extensive knowledge of botany and rural customs. Although it belongs to the period of her greatest engagement with Naturalism, the work demonstrates her distinctive interpretation of the relationship between nature and human beings.

The novel revisits themes from The House of Ulloa, including the perceived moral superiority of the upper classes. Gabriel Pardo reprimands Perucho for pursuing Manuela, emphasizing the social distance between them.

Another theme is spirituality. Pardo Bazán contrasts the physical and spiritual dimensions of human existence and presents the spirit as superior to physiological impulses. The novel therefore frames the conflict between natural law and the moral and religious principles of human society.

Although Pardo Bazán was an important advocate of women's rights, some scholars have argued that this aspect of her thought is complicated or diminished in the two novels of the Pazos cycle. Other interpretations emphasize the ways in which her narrative perspective could challenge traditional gender roles.

== Publication and reception ==
La madre naturaleza was published in 1887, one year after The House of Ulloa, which had established Pardo Bazán as a prominent figure in contemporary Spanish literature. However, the novel did not achieve the same popular success as its predecessor. Its treatment of incest also provoked a largely hostile or silent response from contemporary critics.

Later criticism regarded La madre naturaleza as one of Pardo Bazán's most important works, praising the richness and complexity of its prose and, in some assessments, considering it stylistically and thematically superior to The House of Ulloa.
