= Spanish ship Jorge Juan =

Three ships of the Spanish Navy have been named Jorge Juan, for the Spanish naval officer and scientist Jorge Juan y Santacilia (1713–1773):

- Jorge Juan, a Jorge Juan-class sloop commissioned in 1877, hulked in 1897, and sunk in 1898 during the Spanish–American War.
- Spanish destroyer Jorge Juan (1933) a Churruca-class destroyer commissioned in 1937 and stricken in 1959.
- Spanish destroyer Jorge Juan (D25), a Lepanto-class destroyer, formerly the Fletcher-class destroyer USS McGowan, acquired by the Spanish Navy in 1960 and scrapped in 1988.
