= Wenceslao Fernández Flórez =

Spanish writer (1885-1964)

The Most Excellent Wenceslao Fernández Flórez
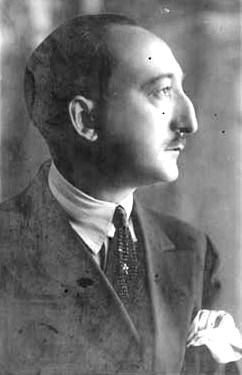
- Born: Wenceslao Fernández Flórez; 1885; A Coruña, Spain
- Died: 29 April 1964 (aged 78–79); Madrid, Spain

Seat S of the Real Academia Española
- In office 14 May 1945 – 29 April 1964
- Preceded by: José Alemany y Bolufer
- Succeeded by: Julián Marías

Wenceslao Fernández Flórez (1885 in A Coruña, Galicia – 29 April 1964 in Madrid) was a popular Galician journalist and novelist of the early 20th century. Throughout his career, he retained an intense fondness for the land of his birth.

== Early life and career ==
His father died when he was fifteen years old, forcing Wenceslao to abandon his education and dedicate himself to journalism. His first job was with A Coruña's La Mañana, and he went on to write for El Heraldo de Galicia, Diario de A Coruña and Tierra Gallega. At the age of eighteen he was given a senior position at Diario Ferrolano. He later returned to A Coruña to work at El Noroeste.

He kept close friendship with Galician nationalism leaders and other intellectuals. Among his friends were Manuel María Puga y Parga a.k.a. "Picadillo", Carré brothers, Tettamanci, Manuel Casas, Angel Castillo and others. All of them were older than him, but who really makes a huge impression in his way of thinking was Castelao, which was one of the most frequently illustrators for his works.

Fernández Flórez was elected to seat S of the Real Academia Española, he took up his seat on 14 May 1945.

== Work in Madrid and novels ==
In 1914 Flórez moved to Madrid, where he worked at El Imparcial and Diario ABC, where he started the parliamentary column Acotaciones de un oyente. He had begun writing novels - La tristeza de la paz (1910), La procesión de los días (1915) and Luz de luna (1915), and Volvoreta (1917).

=== In translation ===
- The Seven Pillars; translated by Sir Peter Chalmers Mitchell, London, Macmillan and co., ltd., (1934), 288 p.
- Seduced. In: Sáenz, Paz, ed. (1988). Narratives from the Silver Age. Translated by Hughes, Victoria; Richmond, Carolyn. Madrid: Iberia. ISBN 84-87093-04-3.

== Works ==
- The sadness of Peace (1910)
- The procession of Days (1914)
- Moonlighting (1915)
- Dimensioning of a listener (Parliamentary Chronicles, 1916)
- Volvoreta (1917), adapted into a film by José Antonio Nieves Conde in 1976
- The Devil's Eye (1918)
- Entered a Thief (1922)
- Vulgar tragedies of life (1922), an anthology of short stories
- Bluebeard's Secret (1923)
- Visions of neurasthenia (1924)
- Women's Footsteps (1924)
- The seven columns (1926)
- Immoral Story (1927)
- The man who wanted to kill (1929), adapted for the screen by Rafael Gil in 1942 with Antonio Casal ( The man who wanted to kill and again by Rafael Gil in 1970 with Tony Leblanc ( The* man who wanted to kill )
- Artificial Ghosts (1930), an anthology of short stories
- Those who did not go to war (1930)
- The evil Carabel (1931), adapted into a film by Edgar Neville in 1935, by Fernando Fernan Gomez in 1956 and Rafael Baledón in 1962
- The man who bought a car (1932)
- Knight Adventures Rogelio Amaral (1933)
- An island in the Red Sea (1938)
- The novel number 13 (1941)
- The Living Forest (1943), adapted into a film by Joseph Neches in 1945, by José Luis Cuerda in 1987 written by Rafael Azcona and Angel de la Cruz and Manolo Gomez in 2001
- The bull, the bullfighter and the Cat (1946)
- Pelegrin system (1949)
- Fireworks (1954)
- Goalkeeper in goal (1957)
