= Castle of Santa Cruz =

Castle in Galicia, Spain

Coordinates: 43°20′54″N 8°21′0″W

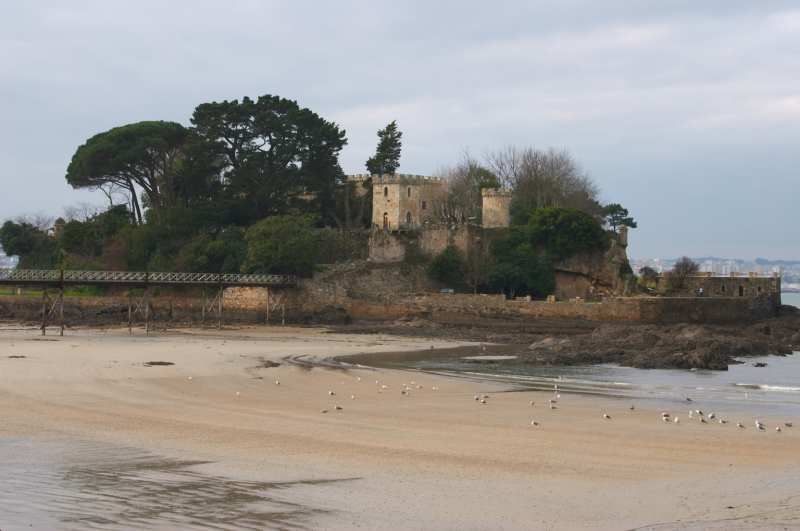
Island of Santa Cruz and castle

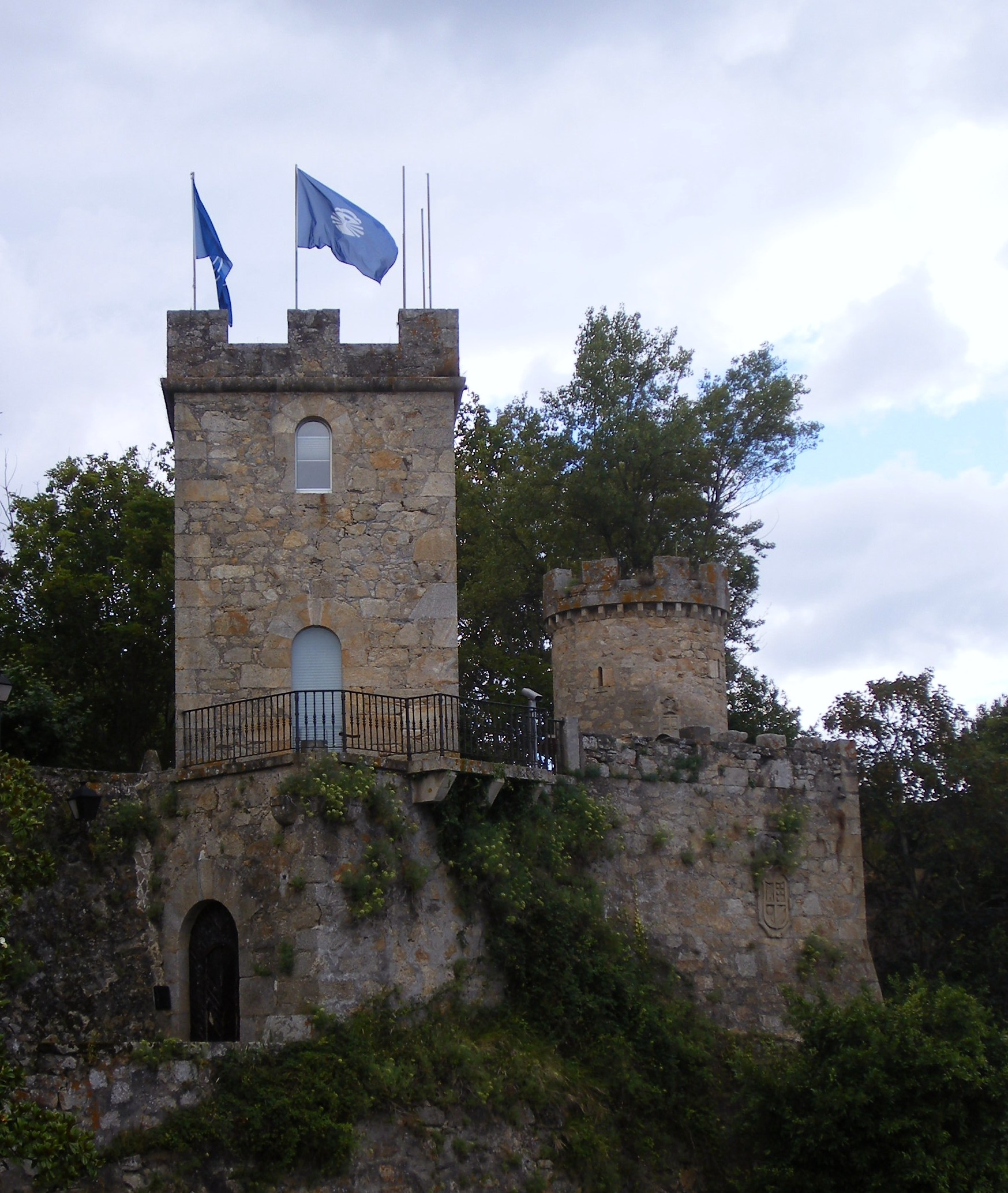
Castle of Santa Cruz

The Castle of Santa Cruz (Galician: Castelo de Santa Cruz) is a castle on an island of the same name in A Coruña, Galicia, Spain. It is located in the town of Porto de Santa Cruz, municipality of Oleiros. The fortress was built in the sixteenth century by General Diego Dasmariñas to improve the defensive system of the bay of A Coruña.

== History ==
Construction began in either 1594 or 1595 when Diego das Mariñas was capitán general of Galicia, following the plans of military engineer Pedro Rodríguez Muñiz. It was completed with new bulwarks, parapets and pavilions in the 18th century, when Martín Cermeño was capitán general.

After losing its strategic value, the castle was abandoned. It was acquired by José Quiroga Pérez de Deza, husband of the author Emilia Pardo Bazán, to serve as their summer residence. In 1939, their daughter Blanca Quiroga donated it to the army to be used as a summer camp for children orphaned in the Spanish Civil War. The castle served this purpose until 1978.

In 1989, the city council of Oleiros acquired the castle for the purpose of environmental education. In 2001, the CEIDA - Centro de Extensión Universitaria y Divulgación Ambiental de Galicia was established in this place through the collaborative efforts of the Xunta de Galicia, the University of A Coruña, and the city council of Oleiros.
