= Manuel María Puga y Parga =

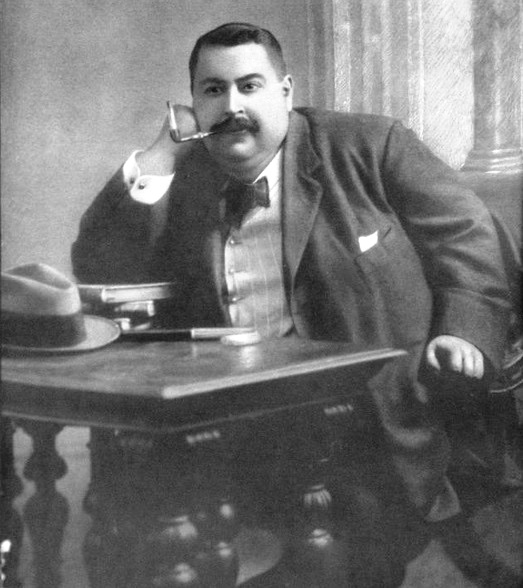

Manuel María Puga y Parga, aka "Picadillo" (1874 – September 30, 1918), was a culinary writer and gastronome who popularized and updated traditional Galician cooking methods. He is a legendary figure among Spanish chefs and gourmands. He was also a lawyer and a politician.

He had a huge sense of humour and he had no problem using it even about himself. For his political biography, he wrote: "In 1882 I was an eight years old man weighing about 75 kg". His excessive weight, which reportedly reached 275 kg, also made him well known. According to writer Luis Anton de Olmert, a circus visited Picadillo's native A Coruña showing a German man as the fattest one in the world, but people got disappointed saying: "Manolo Puga is fatter and you can see him down the street".

== Biography ==
Born in Santiago de Compostela (Galicia, Spain). He was baptized on April 23, 1874, in San Fiz de Solovio, but since he was very young he lived in A Coruña.

His father, Luciano Puga Blanco, was a professor at Faculty of Law and also mayor of Santiago de Compostela, as well as dean of College of Lawyers of A Coruña, governor of Bank of Spain in Cuba, Congressman, senator and supreme court attorney. His grandfather, Manuel Maria Puga Feijoo, was an Isabelline army colonel and heir of the Countess of Ximonde.

"Picadillo" studied law at Santiago de Compostela, where he presented his thesis "Nobility Jurisdictions" in 1895.

Thanks to Canovas del Castillo, friend of his father, he managed to be appointed to a position in Criminal DG, with no need to compete. Unhappy with political environment in Madrid and longing for his homeland, after assassination of Canovas in 1897, he came back to Galicia.

He married María del Carmen Ramón and he was appointed municipal judge in Arteixo. In 1899 his father died and he inherited the Pazo of Anzobre in Arteixo.

He joined with strong prominence to social and cultural life of A Coruña. He had a very close friendship with Wenceslao Fernández Florez and Emilia Pardo Bazán, both famous writers and intellectual figures.

He died at the age of 44 in A Coruña, victim of the 1918 flu pandemic.

== Trip to Cuba ==
In 1891, due to the appointment of his father as Governor of Bank of Spain on the island, he travelled to La Havana by the steamboat Alfonso XIII; so he included in his autobiography the status of "First Class Transatlantic Passenger ". One day he had an incident with a local guy who challenged him to a sword duel. Taking into account Picadillo's obesity that severely limited his agility as a swordsman, it could have been fatal, had it not been for the seconds that suspended the challenge faced with the evident inequality of contenders.

== Political Activity ==
He began writing under the pseudonym "Picadillo" in "El Noroeste", a local newspaper, becoming so popular that in 1913 he wrote an article entitled "I want to be a councilman" and he launched a campaign to be elected. On October 14 that year, he released his speech "Address to sellers of food market" within which we can read: "You do not vote (women), but you have husbands, children... ask them, command them ... if required use the slipper; that in privacy, coercion have nothing to do with electoral law." He was named candidate, elected and took office in January 1914. After Javier Ozores Pedrosa resigned as mayor, Manuel was appointed for the position in October 1914. Although it was brief, central government changed and he was deposed in just two months. He became mayor again when Eduardo Dato rise to power as Spanish Prime Minister in July 1917.

His behaviour during a general strike on August 13, 1917 led him to be removed. But 6,000 unionised workers paid tribute to him and gave him a certificate signed by the 27 unions of the town. This document said: "Labour unions of resistance of A Coruña, bear witness of gratitude and sympathy to Mr. Manuel María Puga and Parga, for his noble attitude from City Hall to municipal workers, due to the general strike in Spain August 13 of the current year. A Coruña, October 28, 1917."

== Activity as a gastronomer ==
He wrote a few cookbooks, including "The practical Cuisine" in 1905, which was a great success, as well as many articles. "Picadillo" was hugely popular in his time as a public figure and writer, known for his sense of humour and defence of popular life style; claiming the cod, sardines and traditional "Lacón con Grelos" (shoulder of pork with turnip greens), in contrast to copies of French cuisine, fashionable in his time for upper class. He said that one of the best experiences of his life had been a rustic fish stew he had eaten in a fishing boat.

Among its many recipes it stands up the one with cod, dedicated to his good friend Wenceslao Fernández Flórez, which reveals the author's sense of humour: "You take a very thin piece of cod, as thin as Wenceslao Fernández Flórez, and you take some tomatoes, too fat, so fat like me. Season Florez and chop me in pieces, and in a saucepan put a layer of pieces of desalted Flórez and a layer of myself. When Flórez is cooked; simmer, top with olive oil lightly fried with lots of onions and garlic. Ten more minutes of fire and a final touch of mince parsley with some salt if needed. And that's life. I will be split by the axis, but you, my friend, you run out of salt which is far worse."

His description of exact time it takes a good "Lacón con grelos" (shoulder of pork with turnip greens) is also curious. "Picadillo" says: "At nine o'clock in the morning, after washing it well, you get to cook the shoulder of pork in enough amount of water. At eleven turnip greens and chorizos are added. At twelve, the peeled whole potatoes. And at one chorizos and lacón are placed in a plate, potatoes and turnip greens in another, and everything on the table, which must be previously surrounded by hungry citizens and plenty of Ribeiro wine stock".

It is striking that only two paragraphs in his extensive cookbook "The practical Cuisine" were devoted to octopus: "Cured Octopus Stew. Recipe of our fairs, which preparation is reduced to the following: a lot of oil, lots of paprika, lots of salt and a big scissors, not very aseptic, to cut as soon as it is cooked. Then, one real (a kind of coin at his time), two real, or more real, depending on appetite of everyone."

== Works ==
- 36 maneras de guisar el bacalao (1901).
- La cocina popular gallega y recetas para la cuaresma.
- Pote aldeano.
- El rancho de la tropa (1909).
- Vigilia reservada: minutas y recetas (1913).
- La cocina práctica (1915), con prólogo de Dª Emilia Pardo Bazán.
- Mi historia politica (1917)
