= Seminary of Nobles of Madrid =

Former building in Madrid

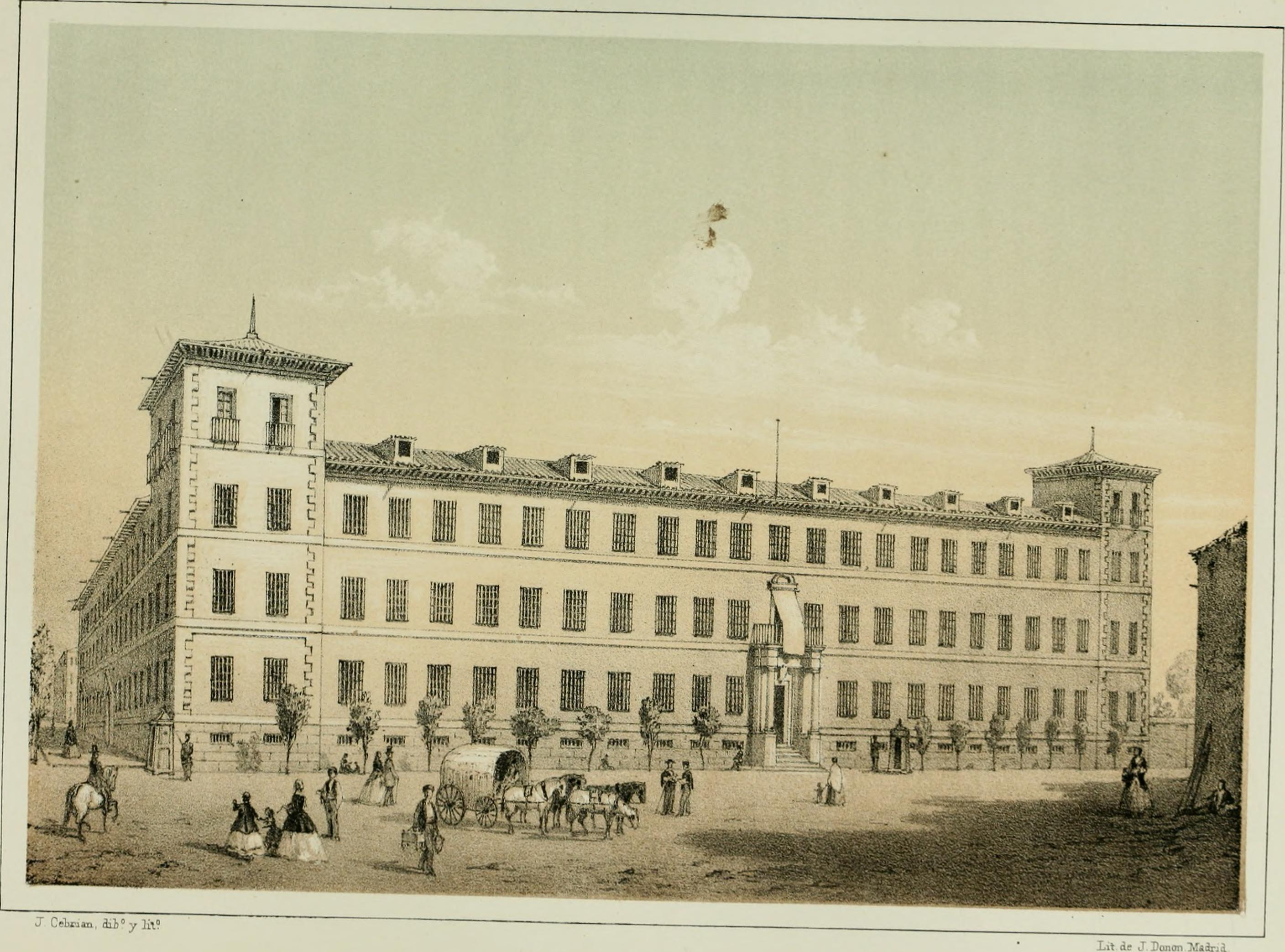
Nobles' Seminary. Later Military Hospital.

The Nobles Seminary was a building, now defunct, in the Spanish city of Madrid. It was located next to Princesa Street.

== History ==
The building, in whose construction Pedro de Ribera was allegedly involved, was initially occupied by the Seminary of Nobles of Madrid, an institution founded in 1725 and linked to the Imperial College, where young men from noble families, as well as military personnel, were educated.

From 1790 to 1800, the Seminary's financial situation continued to deteriorate due to the devaluation of its assigned sources of income. In 1808, following the Napoleonic invasion, Spanish soldiers moved into the building to organize the defense, and classes had to be suspended. In 1809, a decree by Joseph Bonaparte transformed it into a military hospital. The building was also used as a prison and General Riego was imprisoned within its walls before being executed on November 7, 1823.

In 1836, with the abolition of the privileges of the nobility, the Seminary closed its doors permanently, and the building was used to house the University of Alcalá during its move to Madrid, before being repurposed as a military hospital in 1841, consolidating several existing city hospitals that served the same purpose. The hospital's facilities included a chemical laboratory and the Anatomical Pathological Museum. A fire completely destroyed the building between February 5 and 8, 1889.

== Sources ==
- Conde-Salazar Gómez, L.; Heras-Mendaza, F. (2012). "New Information Concerning the History of the Olavide Museum and Its Wax Models". Actas Dermo-Sifiliográficas. 103 (7). doi:10.1016/j.adengl.2012.08.001. ISSN 1578-2190.
- Fernández de los Ríos, Ángel (1876). Guía de Madrid: Manual del madrileño y del forastero (in Spanish). Madrid: Oficinas de la Ilustración Espan︢ola y Americana.
- Mesonero Romanos, Ramón de (1844). Manual histórico-topográfico, administrativo y artistico de Madrid (in Spanish). Madrid: A. Yenes.
- Moratinos Palomero, P.; Moratinos Martínez, M. M.; Martín Sierra, F.; Guijarro Escribano, F. J. (2003). "Historia del Instituto de Medicina Preventiva del E. T. "Capitán Médico Ramón y Cajal"". Medicina Militar (in Spanish). 59 (2): 5–17. ISSN 0212-3568.
- Soubeyroux, Jacques (1995). "El real seminario de nobles de Madrid y la formación de las élites en el siglo XVIII". Bulletin Hispanique (in Spanish). 97 (1): 201–212. ISSN 1775-3821.
- Verdú Ruiz, Matilde (1990). "Creación del Real Seminario de Nobles de Madrid, responsabilidad del arquitecto Pedro de Ribera en su proceso constructivo". Anales del Instituto de Estudios Madrileños (in Spanish). 28. Instituto de Estudios Madrileños: 317–334. ISSN 0584-6374.
