= The Revolver =

The Revolver (El revólver) is a short story by Emilia Pardo Bazán, which was first published in 1895. Ángel Flores later translated it from Spanish to English in 1960. It became one of Pardo Bazán’s classic works in feminist literature.

== Plot summary ==
The Revolver presents the story of two women, Flora, who is in her mid-thirties, and the narrator. Flora seems to be suffering from an illness caused by more than a physical discomfort, she is described as aged beyond her years with pre-mature gray hair and features that suggested a mental affliction. They are both in a bathing resort when Flora decides to confide to the narrator the story of her traumatic marriage. In her story she describes having a happy marriage with her husband, Reinaldo, but then reveals that a year later he begins become jealous very easily. Flora’s husband alienates her from her family and friends. He then threatens her by telling her that he will not question her as to where she is going or with whom as long as she knows that at the slight hint of possible mistrust he will shoot her with his revolver. Flora becomes restless at night and develops anxiety problems that impede her from living a normal life. In the end, her husband dies in a horseback riding incident. She orders her servant to get rid of the revolver but he reveals that the revolver was never loaded. She ends the story by explaining that despite all the remedies against her illness, the unloaded gun shot her, “not in the head but in the center of [her] heart.”

== Characters ==
- Flora- A woman either thirty-five or thirty-six, who recounts the issues of her life while she was married to a jealous man called Reinaldo.
- Reinaldo- Flora’s husband, he is irrationally jealous of his wife’s every move.
- Narrator- A woman in a bathing resort or spa who listens to Flora’s story
- Reinaldo’s Manservant- He is the servant of the house who reveals that the revolver that Reinaldo threatened Flora with was never loaded.

== Significance ==
The Revolver essentially explores the situation of women in nineteenth-century Spain. It is a representation of realism, naturalism and feminism during this era.
