= Brian J. Dendle =

British born hispanist (1936-2013)

Brian John Dendle
- Born: 30 March 1936; Oxford, England
- Died: 3 September 2013 (aged 77); Lexington
- Education: University of Oxford, Princeton University

Brian John Dendle (1936–2013) was a British-born philologist and hispanist settled in the United States. He was professor of Spanish Literature of the University of Kentucky. His research focused on 19th and early 20th century literature and history, dealing with Spain but also with incursions in French and generic Spanish-language literature.

== Biography ==
Born in Oxford, England, on 30 March 1936, he graduated in Romance Languages from the University of Oxford in 1958. After a spell as lecturer in Jamaica and France he moved to the United States by 1961, and he earned a PhD from Princeton University in 1966. He joined the University of Kentucky in 1971. He was also a lecturer at Kenyon College, Princeton University, the University of Michigan and the University of Alabama. He was tenured in 1978. He retired in 2004.

He died on 3 September 2013 in Lexington, Kentucky.

== Works ==
- — (1968). The Spanish Novel of Religious Thesis (1876–1936). Castalia. (republishing of his doctoral dissertation)
- — (1980). Galdós: The Mature Thought. The University Press of Kentucky.
- — (1986). Galdós: The Early Historical Novels. The University of Missouri Press.
- — (1987). Galdós y Murcia: Epistolario de Benito Pérez Galdós y Alberto Sevilla Pérez. Universidad de Murcia.
- — (1990). Galdós y "La Esfera". Universidad de Murcia.
