= Revolve NTNU =

Norwegian motorsport team

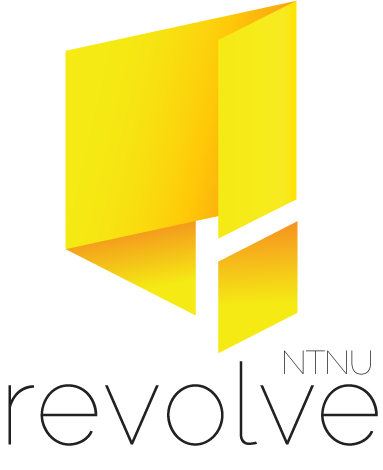
- Type: non-profit
- Industry: activities of other membership organisations n.e.c.
- Founded: 2010
- Headquarters: NTNU Trondheim Norway
- Products: race car
- Members: 81
- Website: revolve.no

Revolve NTNU is Norwegian University of Science and Technology's team for Europe's Formula Student motorsport competition. Established in 2010 and with their first car completed in 2012, when they were the first Norwegian team to participate at the Formula Student competition, the team has expanded to 80 students from different engineering disciplines at the university. They built Norway's first electric race car and Scandinavia's first four-wheel-drive electric race car.

== History ==
=== 2010–2012 ===
The team was established in 2010, when it had eleven members, and first competed with a car named KA Borealis R at the 2012 Formula Student Competition, held at the British Silverstone formula racing track. They were the first Norwegian team to enter, and won the newcomers' prize.

=== 2013 ===
The team's 2013 car, KA Aquilo R, placed 16th at Silverstone and won the National Instruments Measurement & Control Award.

=== 2014 ===
For 2014 Revolve NTNU built Norway's first electric race car, KOG Arctos R. which placed 8th in the electric race car division.

=== 2015 ===
The 2015 car, Vilje, the team's second electric car, placed 26th at Silverstone after a last-minute replacement of the motor with one hand carried from a manufacturer in Slovenia, and then 4th at Formula Student Austria and 6th in the Vienna e-Challenge.

In fall 2015 the race car building program became an official subject of study at the university; as of October 2016 it was the basis of eleven master's theses in progress, as of July 2017, seven.

=== 2016 ===
The 2016 car, Gnist, was Scandinavia's first four-wheel-drive electric race car.

=== 2017 ===
The 2017 car, Eld, was converted for driverless operation.

=== 2018 ===
In 2018 both Eld and Revolve NTNU's newest car with driver, Atmos, competed in Formula Student Germany, where Atmos placed second in the electric division.

=== 2019 ===
In 2019 the team's car, Nova, placed second in the electric car division at Formula Student Austria.

== Sponsors ==
Kongsberg Automotive ASA was the project's first major sponsor. Revolve NTNU also has a partnership with Petter Solberg and Petter Solberg Engineering since November 2011. Bertel O. Steen became a major sponsor in 2017. Other sponsors include Arrow and Midt-Norge Autolakk.
