= Rotation (disambiguation) =

Rotation is a circular motion of a body about a center.

Rotation may also refer to:

== Science, mathematics and computing ==
- Rotation (anatomy)
- Rotation (mathematics)
- Rotation (medicine), medical student training
- Rotation (physics), ratio between a given angle and a full turn of 2π radians
- Circular shift, an operation on a tuple
- Bitwise rotation, a mathematical operator on bit patterns
- Curl (mathematics), a vector operator
- Differential rotation, objects rotating at different speeds
- Display rotation, of a computer monitor or display
- Earth's rotation
- Improper rotation or rotoreflection, a rotation and reflection in one
- Internal rotation, a term in anatomy
- Optical rotation, rotation acting on polarized light
- Rotation around a fixed axis
- Rotational spectroscopy, a spectroscopy technique
- Tree rotation, a well-known method used in order to make a tree balanced.

== Arts, entertainment, and media ==
=== Music ===
- Rotation (musical set theory)
- Rotation (John Frusciante album), 2026
- Rotation (Cute Is What We Aim For album), 2008
- Rotation (Joe McPhee album), 1977
- Rotation (broadcast programming), schedule of repeated broadcasting of the same content
- "Rotate" (song), a song on the album Channel 10 by Capone-N-Noreaga
- "Rotation", a song on the 1979 album Rise by Herb Alpert
- "Rotation (LOTUS-2)", a song on the 2000 album Philosopher's Propeller by Susumu Hirasawa

=== Other uses in arts, entertainment, and media ===
- Rotation (film), a 1949 East German film
- Rotation (pool), a type of pocket billiards game
- SC Rotation Leipzig, former name for the German sports club 1. FC Lokomotive Leipzig

== Politics ==
- Rotation government, the practice of a government switching Prime Ministers mid-term from an individual in one political party to a different individual in another political party

== Other uses ==
- Rotation (aviation), the act of lifting the nose off the runway during takeoff
- Rotation, in baseball pitching; see the glossary of baseball
- Crop rotation, a farming practice
- Job rotation, a business management technique
- Robson Rotation, a method of having ballot papers in elections
- Stock rotation, a retail practice

== See also ==
- Rotator (disambiguation)
