= Calle de la Princesa =

Street in Madrid, Spain

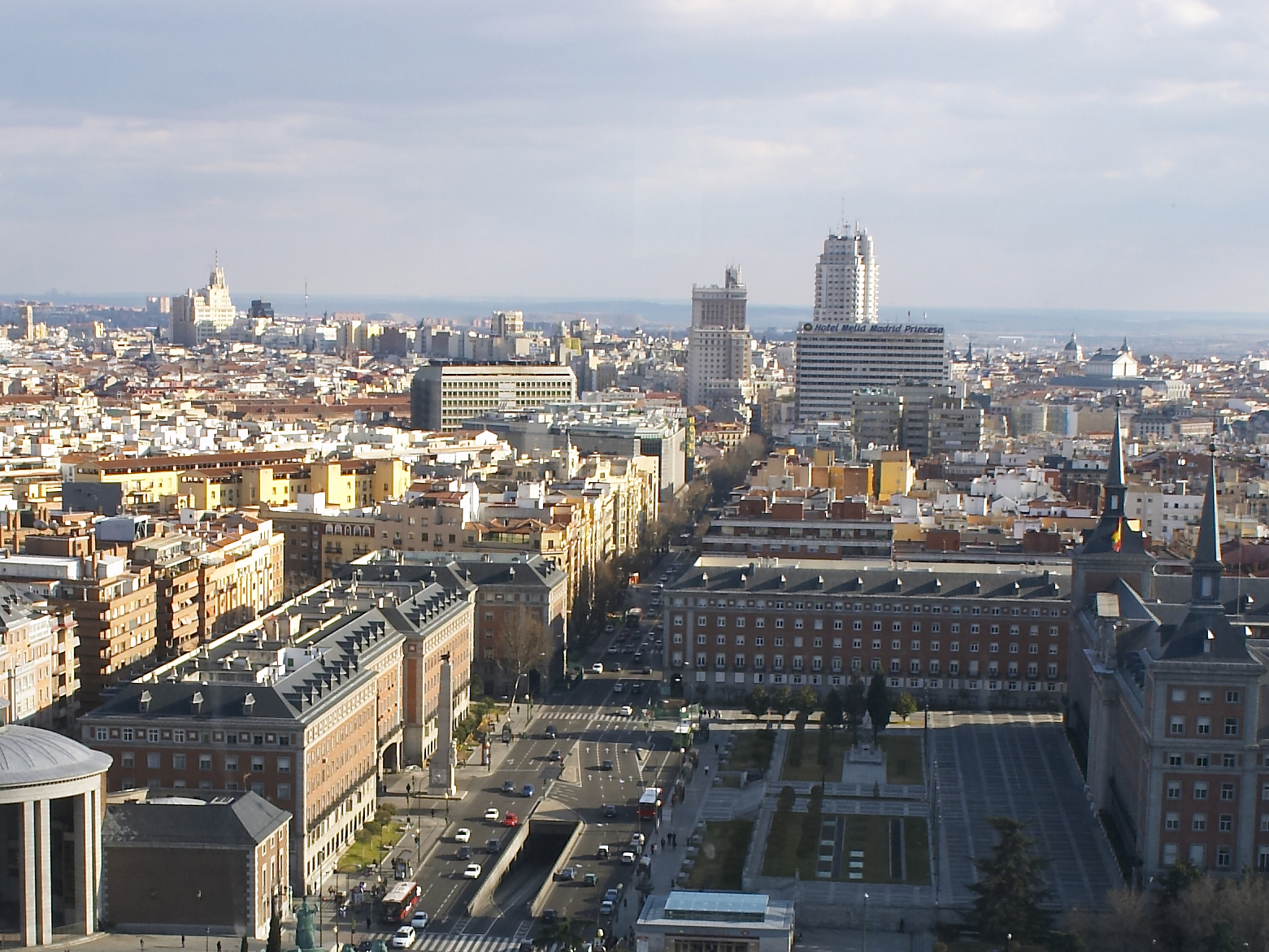
- Interactive map of Calle de la Princesa
- Namesake: Infanta Isabel de Borbón, "La Chata"
- Type: street
- Location: Madrid, Spain
- Southeast end: Plaza de España
- Northwest end: Plaza de la Moncloa

The calle de la Princesa is a street in Madrid, Spain.

== Description ==
The street, starting at the Plaza de España sort of is a North-West prolongation of the Gran Vía. It forms the limit between the district of Moncloa-Aravaca (west) with the Centro and Chamberí districts (east). It ends at the Plaza de la Moncloa.

== History ==
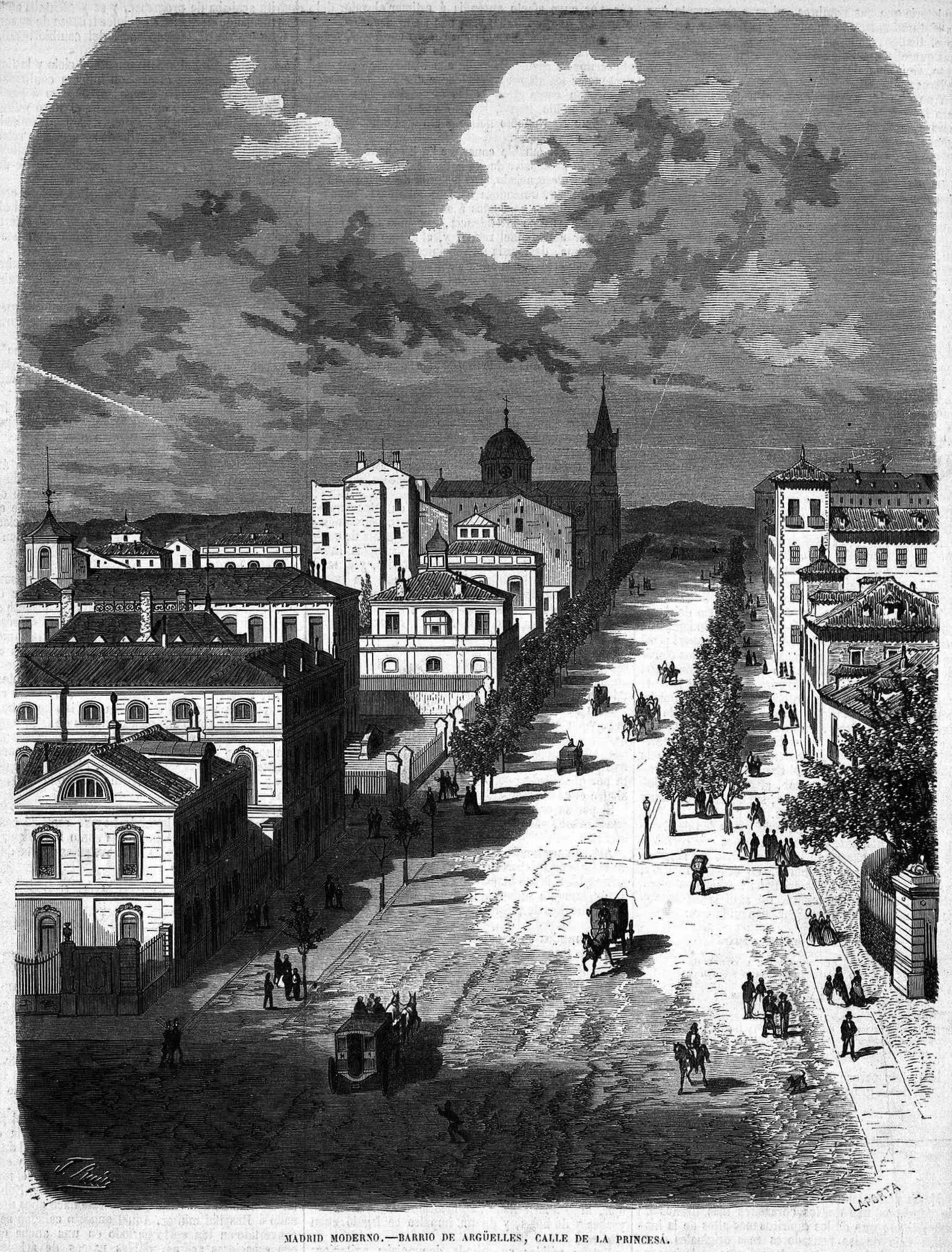
Early illustration of the street (El Museo Universal; 13 January 1867).

It traces its origins back to the road of San Bernardino. Formerly known as "Duque de Liria", the street was renamed as Princesa ("Princess") in 1865, after Isabella de Borbón y Borbón (popularly known as "La Chata"), first-born daughter of Queen Isabella II.

Despite the impending urbanisation of the neighborhood of Argüelles, during the Sexenio Democrático the works of the leveling to link the streets of Leganitos and Duque de Osuna and Princesa were halted. During this period the street was named Olózaga after the progressive mayor of Madrid Salustiano de Olózaga. The street was part of the route of the first tram in the city, operated by The Madrid Street Tramway Co. Ltd., inaugurated in 1871. A sculpture of Agustín Argüelles was inaugurated at the junction of Princesa with Marqués de Urquijo in 1902.
