= Joaquín Llorens y Fernández de Córdoba =

Spanish painter

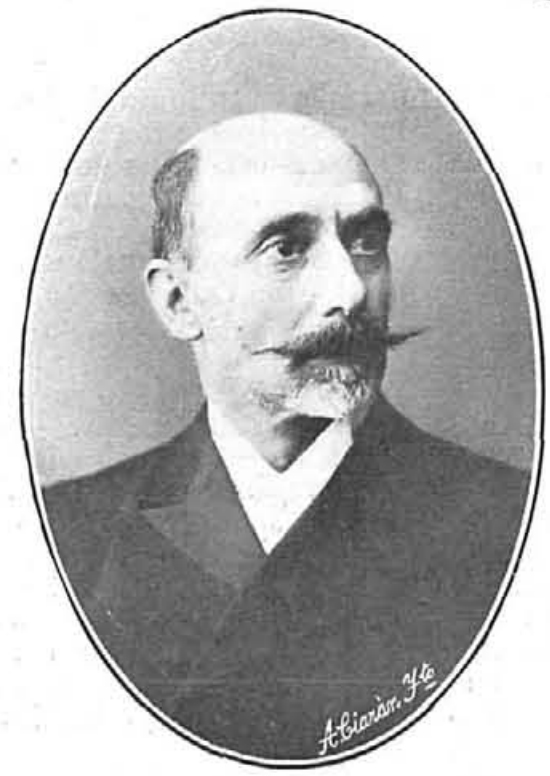
- Born: Joaquín Llorens y Fernández de Córdoba; 1854; Valencia, Spain
- Died: 1930 (aged 75–76); Ontinyent, Spain
- Occupation: military
- Known for: soldier, politician
- Political party: Comunión Tradicionalista

Joaquín Llorens y Fernández de Córdoba (1854 – 1930) was a Spanish Carlist soldier and politician. He is known as the longest serving Carlist deputy (1893 to 1919), the longest continuously serving Carlist deputy (1901 to 1919), and the most-elected Carlist deputy (11 times). He is also recognized for turning Requeté from a vague youth organization into a military force.

== Family and youth ==
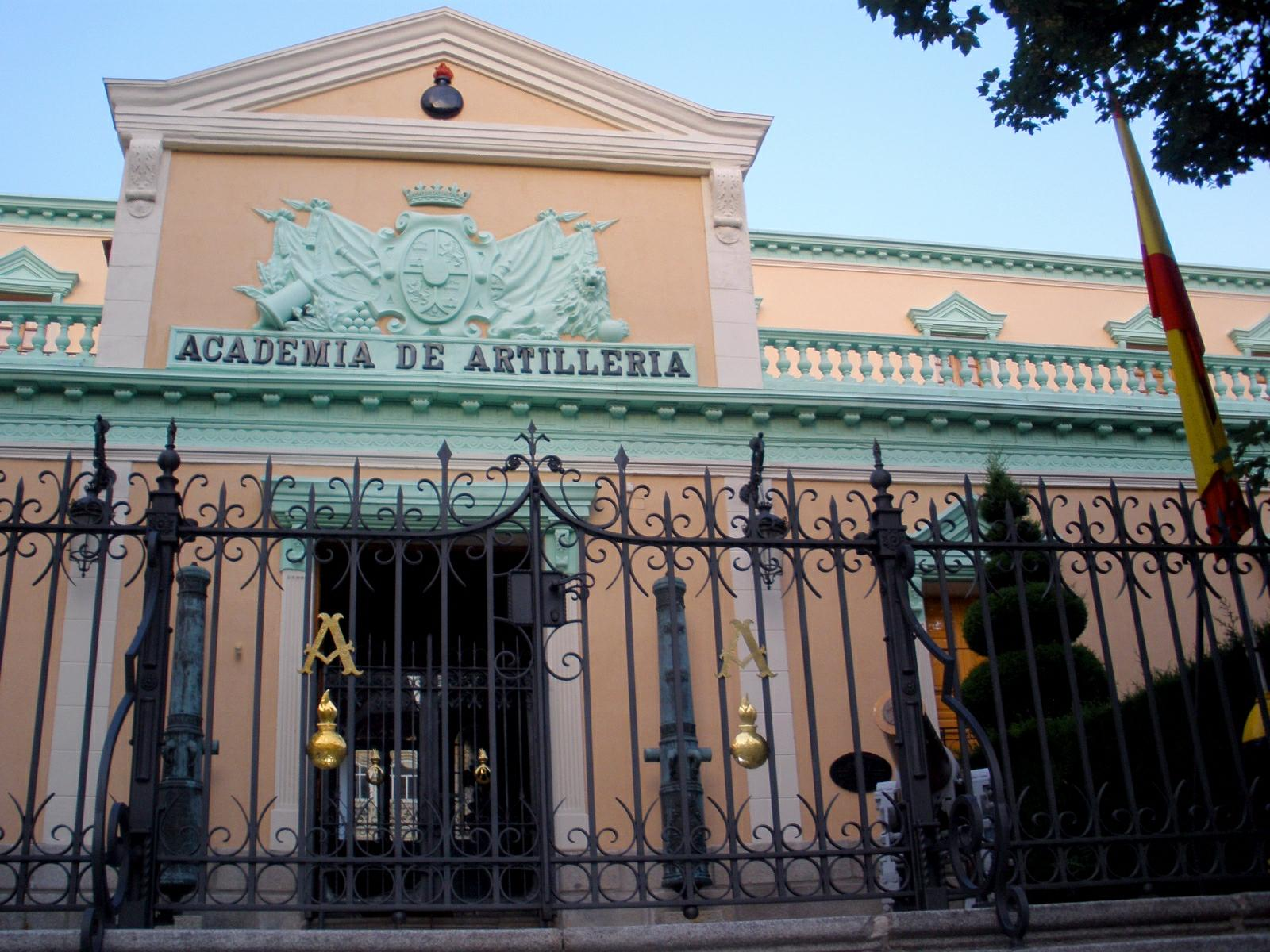
Academia de Artilleria, Segovia

Joaquín Lloréns Fernández de Córdova was born to a distinguished Levantine family, originating from Nules but for generations settled in Villareal; his ancestors can be traced back to the 16th century. His grandfather, Joaquín Lloréns Chiva, was a judge and academic in Valencia, serving also as sindico general of the city in the early 19th century. His father, José Joaquín Lloréns Bayer (1807–1863), pursued a military career. As a 16-year-old he joined the Voluntarios Realistas militia and fought against the Liberals during the 1821-23 civil war. In 1833 he volunteered to the Carlist insurgency; distinguished in a number of battles of the First Carlist War he rose to general brigadier and was twice awarded Cruz de San Fernando, also nominated marqués de Cordoba by Carlos V. Following the Carlist defeat in 1839 he accompanied Carlos V into exile, later on living in France and Russia; he returned to Spain in wake of the 1848 amnesty. During the Second Carlist War he sided with the Isabellinos and successfully fought the Carlist troops in Levante; in return he got his brigadier rank and military honors (though not his marquesado) recognized by the Isabella II government. Served as mayor of Villareal. Married to Joaquína Fernández de Córdova e Ibáñez de Ocerín, the couple had 5 children. Joaquín, their only son, was steered to become a military as well, though unlike his father not in the ranks of infantry. As a 14-year-old he joined Academia de Artillería in Segovia, promoted to alférez-alumno in 1871.

== Soldier ==
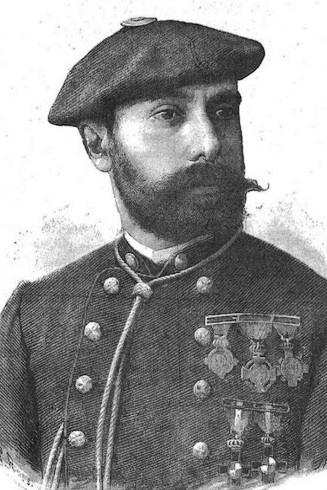
Lloréns, 1870s

As a 19-year-old Joaquín Lloréns joined the insurgent troops at the outbreak of the Third Carlist War. He fought on the Northern front during the 1873 campaign in Navarre: soon promoted to teniente, he took part in the sieges of Viana and of Valcarlos. Following the inconclusive battle of Mañeru, which repulsed the Liberal troops during their march on Estella, and the likewise undecided battle of Montejurra, Lloréns contributed to clear victories at Belabieta and Dicastillo, which finally stabilized Carlist rule in Navarre and Gipuzkoa. Early 1874 he proceeded in line with the Carlist offensive in Vizcay, which climaxed in the siege of Bilbao. In February 1874 his unit was assigned to carry out an attack on the pocket of Republican Gipuzkoan resistance in Tolosa; in March it took part in the victorious attempt to prevent the Liberal relief of Bilbao during the slaughter at Somorrostro; Lloréns commanded the 120-mm cannon artillery. Continued to fight around Bilbao during the failed battle of San Pedro Abanto in the spring of 1874.

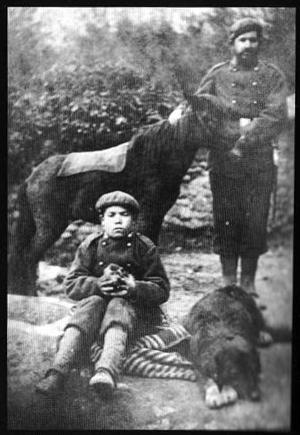
a Carlist, a boy, a pottok and a dog, early 1870s

With the siege of Bilbao broken the Liberal troops continued their advance on Estella; Lloréns was fighting in the victorious Abárzuza and Oteiza battles in the summer of 1874, which eventually led to the stalemate period that followed. Struggled to sort out the Carlist artillery logistics, making sense of wide variety of artillery pieces available. He participated in the February 1875 battle of Lácar, which is sometimes considered the most brilliant and daring Carlist victory of the war and which threatened the new king Alfonso XII, present at the site, personally. He took part in one of the last confrontations of the conflict, the battle of Palomeras de Etxalar (February 1876). His performance during the assault on Lumbier (October 1875) gained him Cruz Roja del Mérito Militar, with the second one obtained for directing artillery fire during the battle of Mañeru. Wounded in action a number of times. Following the battle of San Pedro Abanto he was nominated a captain, following the battle of Salvatierra/Agurain he rose to a comandante, and he finished the war as a colonel. Following the Carlist defeat in 1876 he accompanied Carlos VII into exile and crossed the French border.

== Civil Servant ==
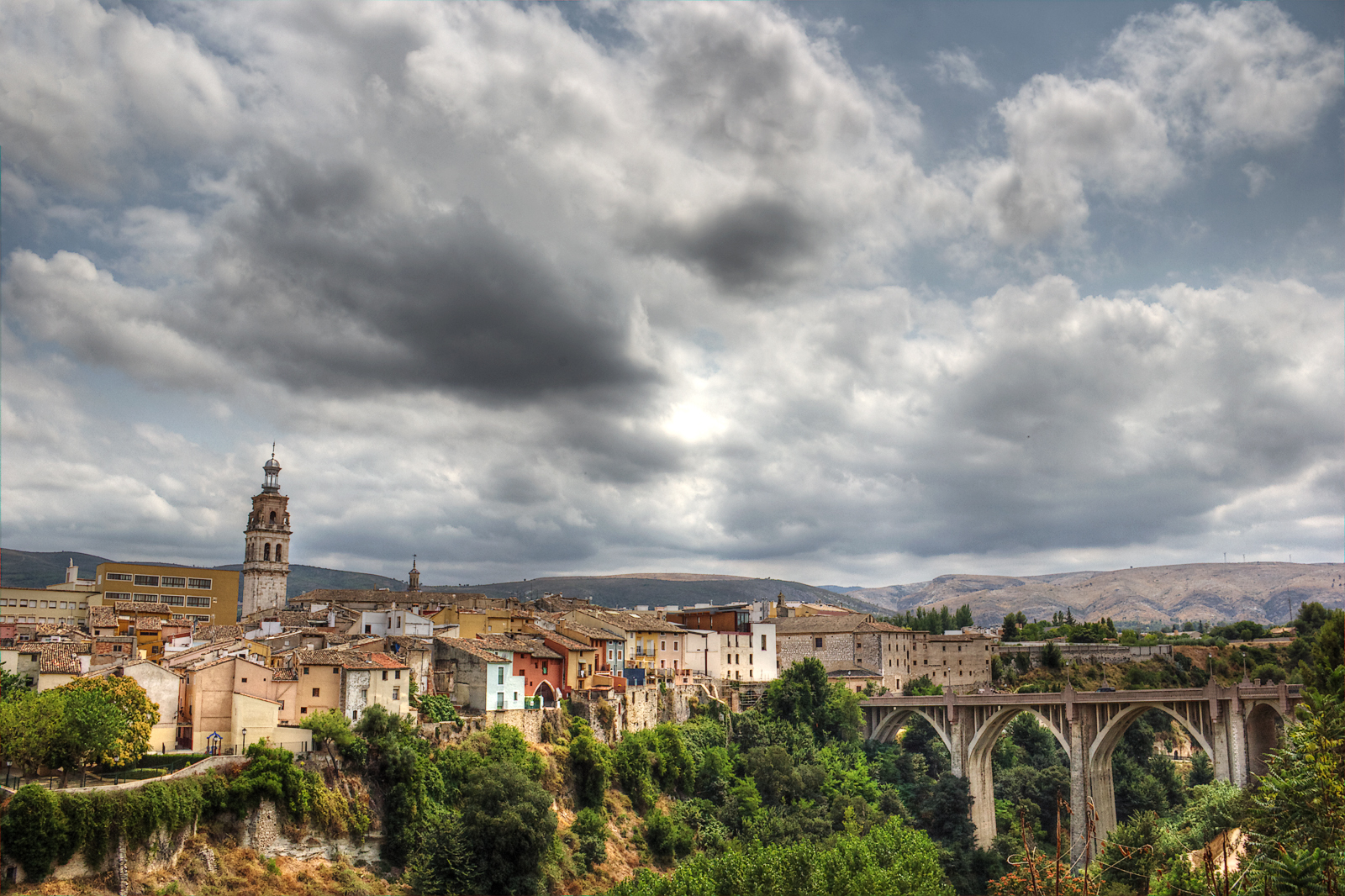
View of Ontinyent

Lloréns returned to Spain in the late 1870s. In 1879 he married Concepción Colomer y Conca and settled in her native town of Ontinyent, in the family residence at Carre Gomis in the city centre; the couple had 2 sons and 2 daughters. Active in Juventud Católica, published three volumes of his war recollections. In the mid-1880s he produced the first designs to re-direct the Turia river near Valencia and to re-build the local maritime infrastructure accordingly, to create a park along the river banks and to expand the local tram network. He taught at the Valencian Academia de Matemáticas, becoming a recognized scholar also in astronomy. Occasionally contributed to newspapers, himself founded a satirical review El Centro, practiced oil painting and used to win honors in local exhibits. Lloréns invented a handgun which bore his name; the patent was registered in 1897 and featured a repeating rifle with detachable magazine box, though apparently it has never entered production.

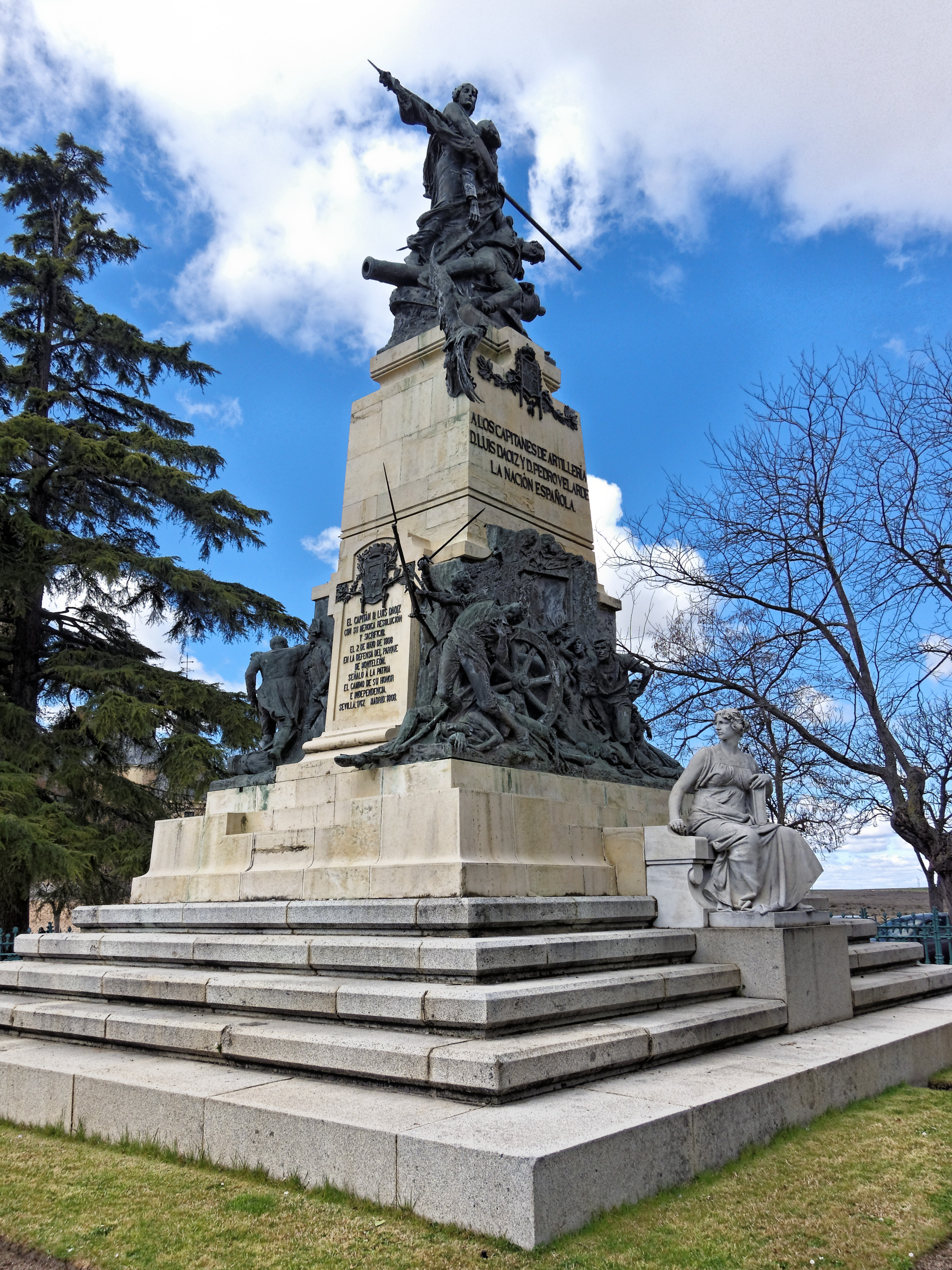
Segovia monument

In 1909 he travelled – either in liaison with the military or as a military himself – to Morocco, most likely to assist in operations carried out during the rapidly escalating conflict between the Spanish and the Rif tribes in the Gurugú region. He published related correspondence in military periodicals and popular press titles like Correo Español. In 1908 Lloréns initiated action on the old dormant Cortes of Cádiz resolution to commemorate the 1808 war with a monument in Segovia, in front of the military barracks where he had studied 40 years earlier; the motion led to the memorial being unveiled by Alfonso XIII, though Lloréns did not take part in the 1910 celebrations. He continued writing to the press, though in the 20th century to the Navarrese rather than Levantine papers, mostly the Carlist or foralist titles like La Lealtad Navarra (transformed in 1897 into El Pensamiento Navarro) or Navarra Ilustrada.

== Deputy ==
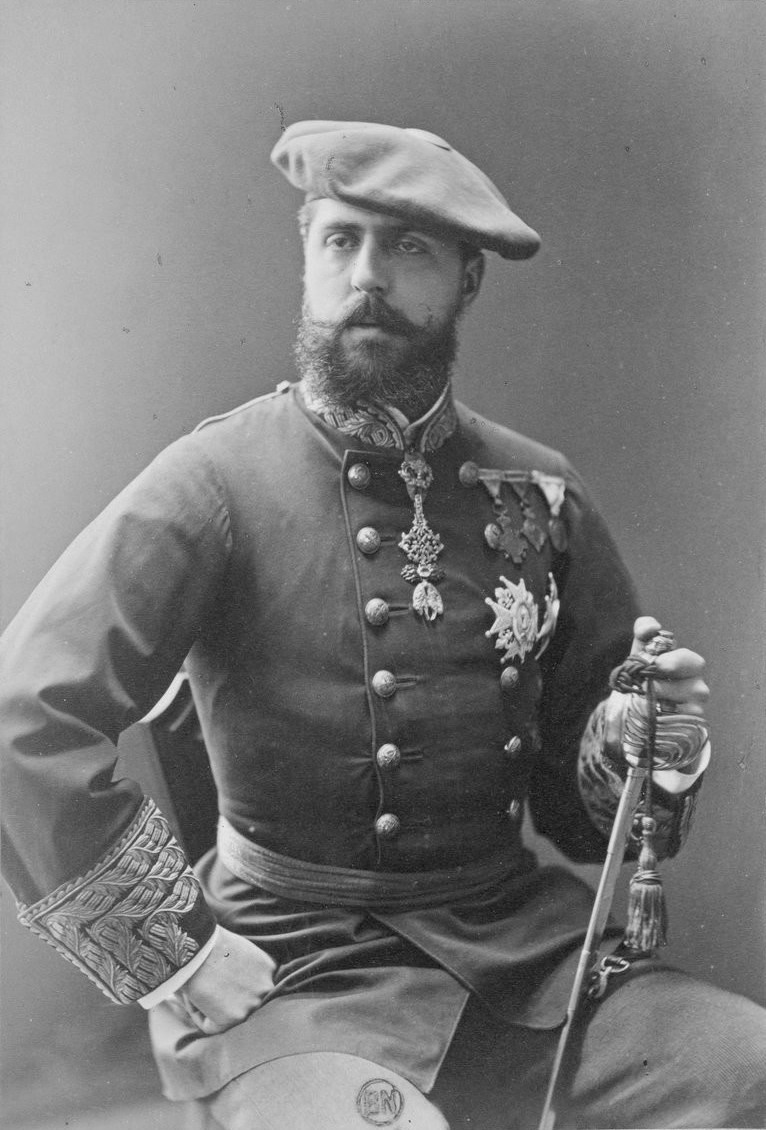
S.M. Carlos VII

In 1893 Lloréns, one of the leading Levantine Carlists, got elected to the Congress of Deputies from Castellón as one of the first Traditionalist deputies of the Restoration era. In course of his first tenure he actively engaged in defence of regional establishments during gamazada, an attempt on part of the Liberal government to modernise the administration and scrap the 1841 semi-autonomous fiscal Navarrese establishments; he was the only non-Navarrese deputy to vote against the proposal. 12 years later he was rewarded with the title of Navarrese hijo adoptivo in return. In 1896 he successfully ran from the Catalan Gerona and was re-elected from the same constituency in 1898. In 1899 the claimant Carlos VII decided not to field an official list permitting only individual candidatures, but Lloréns was engaged in staging insurgency rather than running for the parliament he just planned to overthrow.

In 1901 Lloréns resumed his deputy career, this time from the stronghold Carlist Navarrese district of Estella. Though his first Estellese victory was not impressive (54%), he trashed his rivals in the following campaigns of 1903–1907. No-one dared to confront him in the 1910–1916 period and he was declared a deputy according to the famous Article 29, sealing the Carlist domination of the province, though he had to face competition in his last 1918 electoral campaign. He is noted for successful lobbying for construction of the schools (including what is now Casa Consistorial), water pipes and military barracks. As a Carlist he voiced against the visit of Alfonso XIII in Estella in 1903; when it actually took place, Lloréns left the city for duration of the royal visit. In 1917 he spoke in favour of the navarrese autonomy and took part in the 1918 local assembly which called for full reincorporation of the pre-1839 local Navarrese arrangements; as the conflict between radical antitreintainuevistas and moderate cuarentaiunistas mounted, Lloréns sided with the former.

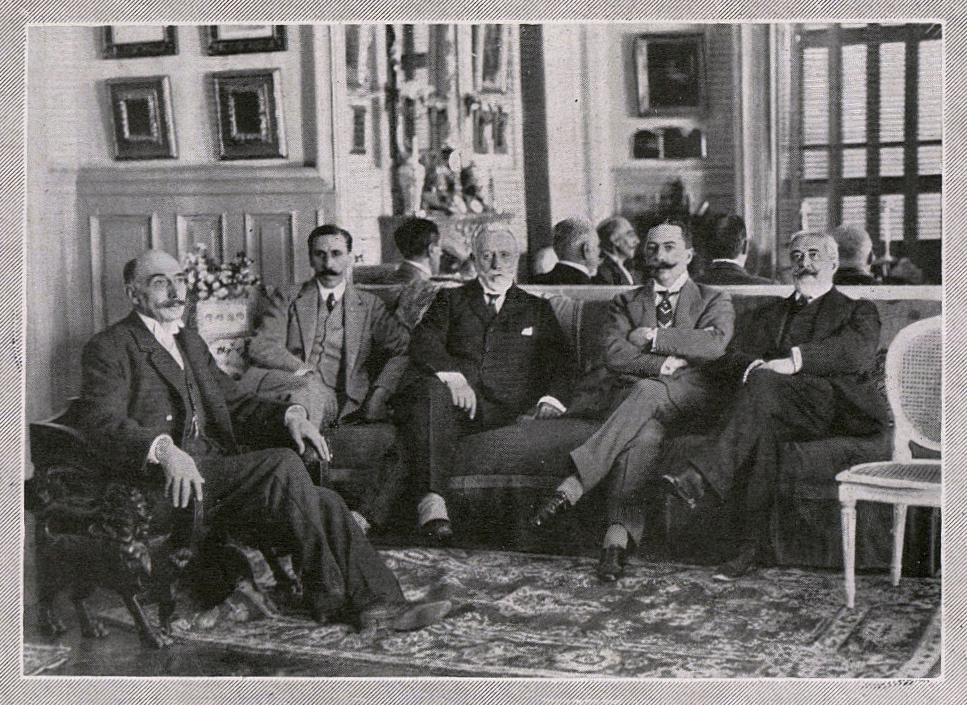
Lloréns and his king, around 1910

As a Carlist deputy Lloréns set a number of still holding records. He is the most-elected Carlist Navarrese deputy ever (8 times, ex-aequo with Vázquez de Mella), the most victorious Carlist candidate in Navarrese elections (99.5% of the votes cast in 1907), the longest serving Carlist deputy ever (24 years, 1893 to 1919 with the break in 1899–1901, the longest continuously serving Carlist deputy ever (18 years, 1901 to 1919), and the most-elected Carlist deputy ever (11 times).

== Conspirator ==
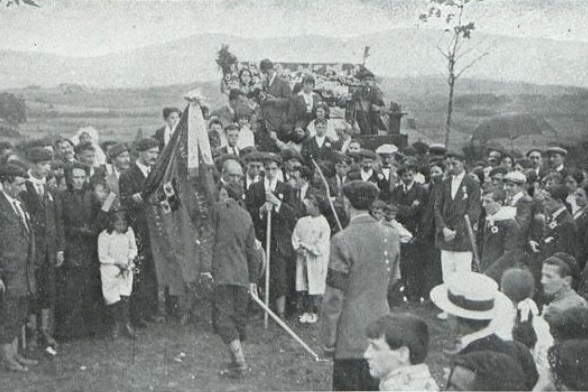
Requeté taking oath, 1910s

In 1898–1899 Lloréns took part in preparations for an aborted Carlist coup. He was among the hawks, pressing for insurgency against reluctance of the cautious leaders; the Alfonsist press widely considered him sort of clandestine Carlist "minister of war". In 1905 Lloréns reported allusively to Carlos VII that anti-liberal demonstrators in Levante carried a high potential for rebellion.

In 1910 the new Carlist claimant Don Jaime recognized Lloréns as chief military adviser by summoning him to the Frohsdorf residence and appointing him to re-organise Requeté, an organization set up 3 years earlier by Juan María Roma and originally designed as a sporting and outdoor grouping for 12- to 16-year-olds. The move marked a major change in the Carlist war doctrine, shifting focus from conspiracy among professional officers to a popular militia rising.

The plan envisioned that Requeté becomes less of a scouting group and more of a paramilitary organization. Lloréns, reporting to political Carlist leader Bartolomé Feliú Pérez (marqués de Cerralbo after 1912) and Don Jaime himself, strived to build a nationwide network; he wrote regulations for local and comarca units, nominated provincial and regional leaders, and set up Junta Central Tradicionalista Organizadora de los Requetés de Cataluña. His intention was to bring more experienced military staff into the organization, so that under their command it could form local combat units capable of staging military action for the Carlist cause, should the opportunity arise. The only region where the organization developed into a significant structure was Catalonia, mostly thanks to the local Requeté commander, Matías Lloréns Palau.

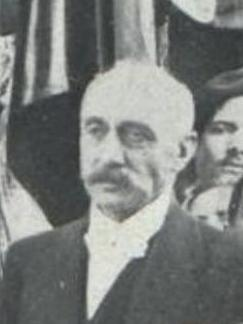
Lloréns 1913

The paramilitary build-up did not lead to action since despite the assassination of Canalejas, division within the conservatives, anarchist unrest and the looming European war, the situation in Spain remained fairly stable; belligerent enthusiasm of Requeté, Juventud Jaimista and possibly Lloréns himself was frustrated. Eventually the organization scheme as created by Lloréns survived some 20 years, until it was restructured by José Luis Zamanillo. It actually slipped into a decline starting 1914, suffering from growing coolness between enthusiastically Germanophile Lloréns and the Francophone claimant. It is possible that in the summer of 1917 Lloréns planned to provoke an unauthorized rebellion in Navarre, but these designs came to nothing. Requeté stagnated further on in 1916–1919, as in terms of popular mobilization Carlism was increasingly outpaced by the Conservatives. At the outbreak of the Mellista crisis in 1918 Lloréns seemed disoriented; since 1914 at odds with the Carlist king, accused of abuse of power and sidetracked, he stayed loyal to his king. Defeated in Estella in 1919, he eventually withdrew from politics; other sources quote his declining health. By the end of his life he served as alcalde of Ontinyent, where he died during the very last months of the detested Alfonsist monarchy.

== See also ==
- Carlism
- Third Carlist War
- Restoration (Spain)
- Requetés
