= Statue of Velázquez (Madrid) =

Monument in Madrid

Velázquez
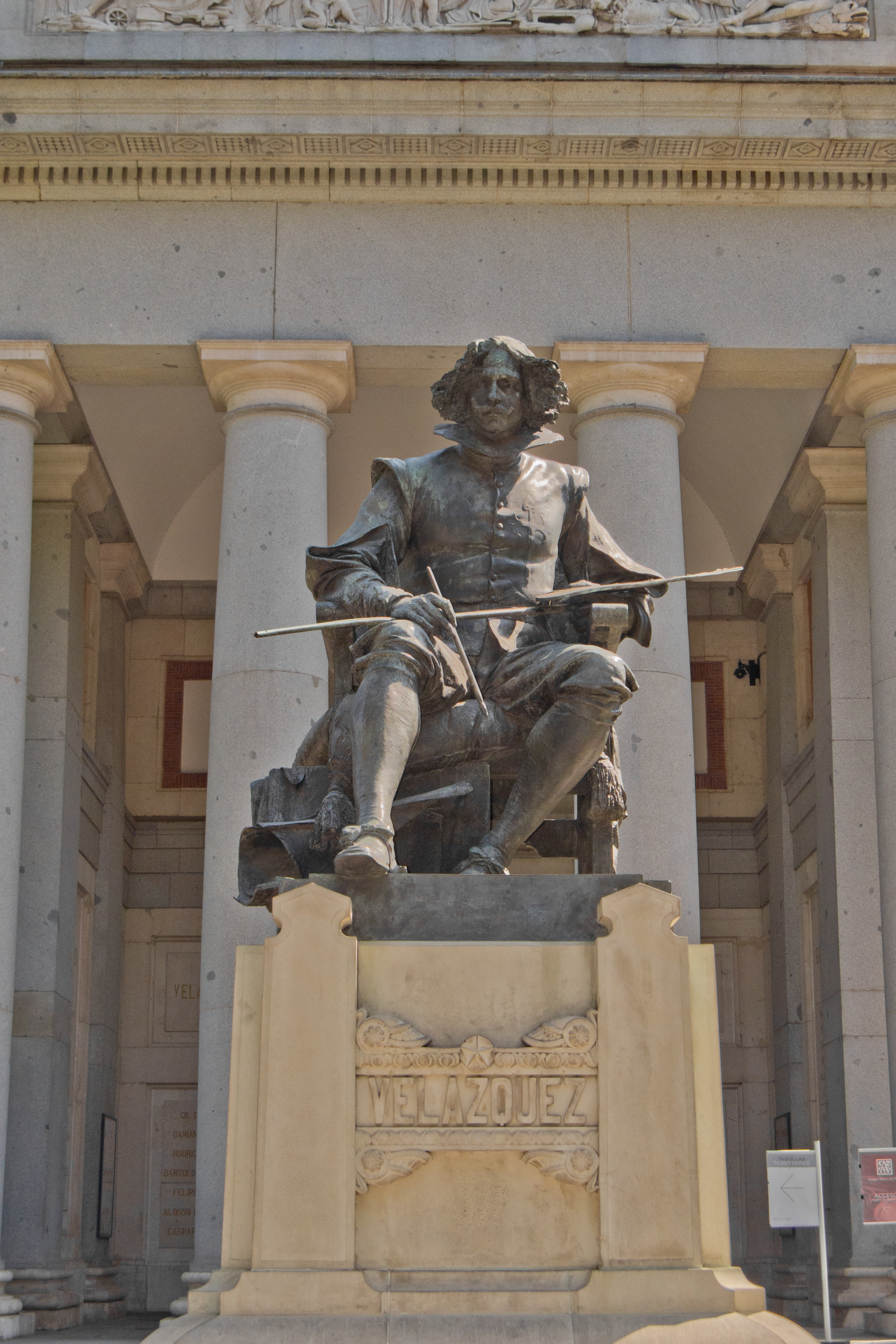
- 40.413736°N 3.692689°W
- Location: Paseo del Prado, Madrid, Spain
- Designer: Aniceto Marinas (statue); Vicente Lampérez (pedestal)
- Material: Bronze, stone
- Height: 3.5 m
- Opening date: 14 June 1899
- Dedicated to: Diego de Velázquez

Velázquez or the Statue of Velázquez is an instance of public art in Madrid, Spain. Located in front of the main gate of the Prado Museum, it is dedicated to Diego de Velázquez.

== History and description ==
The statue was an idea of the Círculo de Bellas Artes. The statue was cast at Masriera & Campins' foundry in Barcelona, using bronze gifted by the Spanish State. Modelled by Aniceto Marinas, the statue features a seated Velázquez, with his palette and brush at rest. The Velázquez's hand gesture imitates that of the painter's self-portrait in Las Meninas.

A work by Vicente Lampérez and funded by the Society of Architects, the pedestal, standing 1.90 metre high, is a cube made of white stone from Monóvar. On its front side, it features the name of "Velázquez" surmounted by a star. The left and right sides of the plinth are carved with the '1599' and '1660' dates, respectively. Meanwhile, the back side of the cube reads "Los artistas españoles por iniciativa del Círculo de Bellas Artes — 1899" ("the Spanish artists under the initiative of the Circle of Fine Arts — 1899").

The monument was unveiled on 14 June 1899, as part of the festivities for the 300th anniversary of the birth of the painter. The ceremony of inauguration was attended by the royal family (including the Queen Regent Maria Christina and the King Alfonso XIII), the ministers of Public Works and the Navy, Santiago de Liniers, Francisco Romero Robledo, Repullés y Vargas, Benlliure and Ruiz Guerrero. Some of the speakers during the ceremony included French painters Carolus-Duran and Jean-Paul Laurens, and Edward Poynter, president of the British Royal Academy.
