= Manuel Ruiz =

Manuel Ruiz may refer to:

- Manuel Antonio Ruíz de la Rosa (born 1965), Dominican Republic Roman Catholic bishop
- Manuel Ruiz Guerrero (1864–1917), Spanish painter and illustrator
- Manuel Ruiz de Lopera (1944–2024), Spanish businessman, owner of football club Real Betis
- Manuel Ruiz Pérez (born 1962), Spanish football goalkeeper and manager
- Manuel Ruiz Sosa (1937–2009), Spanish football midfielder and manager
- Manuel Ruiz Urriés de Castilla (1734–1812), Spanish colonial official in the Viceroyalty of Peru
- Manuel Ruiz Valledor (fl. 1900s), Chilean politician
- Manuel Ruiz Zorrilla (1833–1895), Spanish politician, two-time prime minister in the 1870s
- Manuel Ruiz Maya (1888–1936), Spanish physician and politician, executed by Francoist Spain
- Manuel Ruiz López (died 1860), Roman Catholic saint, one of the 11 Martyrs of Damascus
- Manuel Ruiz, 19th-century Mexican politician, served two terms at the Secretariat of the Interior
- Manuel Ruiz, 19th-century Mexican politician, served two terms as governor of Tamaulipas
