= Aniceto Marinas =

Spanish sculptor (1866–1953)

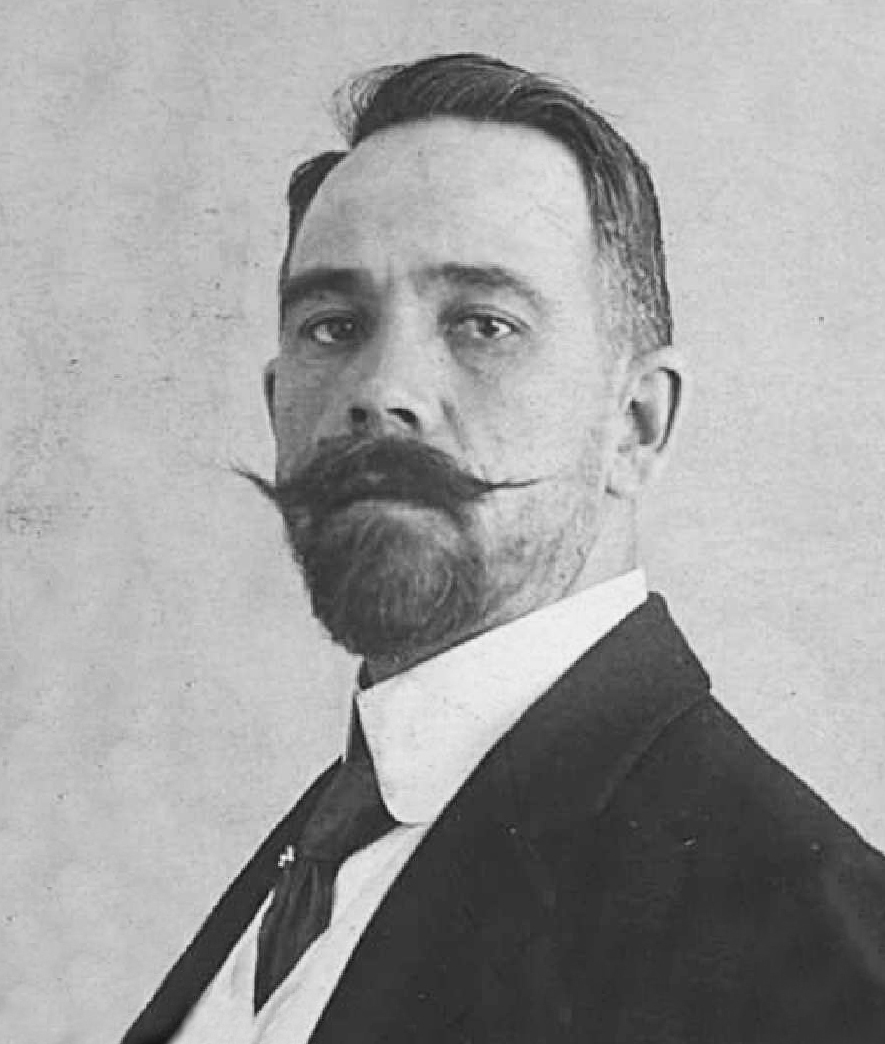
Marinas photographed by Julio Duque

Aniceto Marinas García (born 17 April 1866 in Segovia – died 23 September 1953 in Madrid) was a Spanish sculptor. He studied at the Real Academia de Bellas Artes de San Fernando, taking further studies at the Academia Española de Bellas Artes de Roma.

He became Director of the Real Academia de Bellas Artes de San Fernando in 1950, in replacement of the Count of Romanones.

== Works ==
- Monumento a los héroes del dos de Mayo, Segovia.
- Hermanitos de leche, Segovia.
- Velázquez, Paseo del Prado, Madrid.
- Al pueblo del dos de mayo de 1808, Madrid.
- Eloy Gonzalo, Madrid.
- Monument to the Constitution of 1812, Cádiz

Academic offices
Preceded by Count of Romanones	Director of the Real Academia de Bellas Artes de San Fernando; 1950–1953	Succeeded by Fernando Álvarez de Sotomayor
