= Al pueblo del dos de mayo de 1808 =

Public art in Madrid, Spain

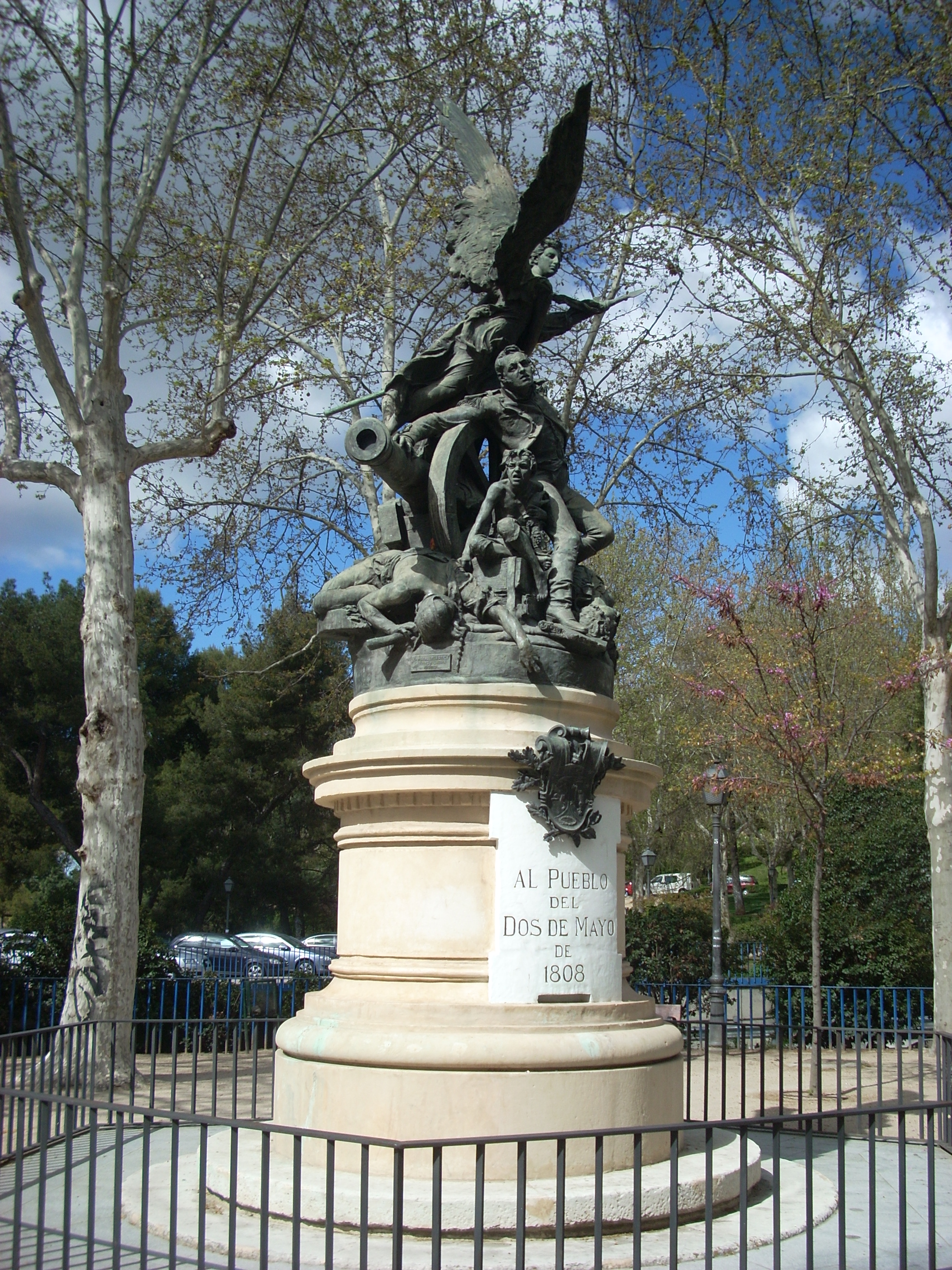
- 40.42316°N 3.714884°W
- Location: Plaza de España, Madrid, Spain
- Designer: Aniceto Marinas
- Material: Bronze, limestone
- Height: 3.50 m
- Opening date: 4 May 1908
- Dedicated to: The role of the Madrilenian people during the Dos de mayo uprising

A los héroes del dos de mayo or Al pueblo del dos de mayo de 1808 is an instance of public art in Madrid, Spain. A sculptural work by Aniceto Marinas, the monument is an homage to the role of the Madrilenian people during the 1808 Dos de mayo uprising.

== History and description ==
Originally sculpted in Rome by Aniceto Marinas in 1891, the sculptural group depicts a winged statue holding a banner that emerges on top of a soldier, a cannon, a small boy and a number of corpses, male and female alike.

The ensemble was inaugurated in the morning of 4 May 1808 at its original location on the Glorieta de Ruiz Jiménez (glorieta de San Bernardo), with the Count of Peñalver (Mayor of Madrid) and Antonio Maura (Prime Minister) intervening as speakers in the ceremony, and Alfonso XIII eventually proceeding to unveil the monument.

There was no time to cast the bronze for the inauguration, and instead the plaster model of the sculptural group was installed, secretly disguised by a greenish paint, which soon faded after the rains, to the surprise of the Madrilenian people. In October 1908, the bronze statue, cast in Madrid by "La Metaloplástica. Campins y Codina" foundry, was put on the pedestal.

The cylindrical stone pedestal features an inscription reading "al pueblo / del / dos de mayo / de / 1808" ("to the People of the 2 May 1808"), surmounted by a bronze rendition of the municipal coat of arms.

Over the years, the monument was moved to the Glorieta de Quevedo and, in the 1960s, (Note: Depending on the source: 1966 or 1967.) to its current location in some gardens near the Plaza de España and, since the 1970s, also the Temple of Debod.
