= Monument to Eloy Gonzalo =

Statue in Madrid

Eloy Gonzalo
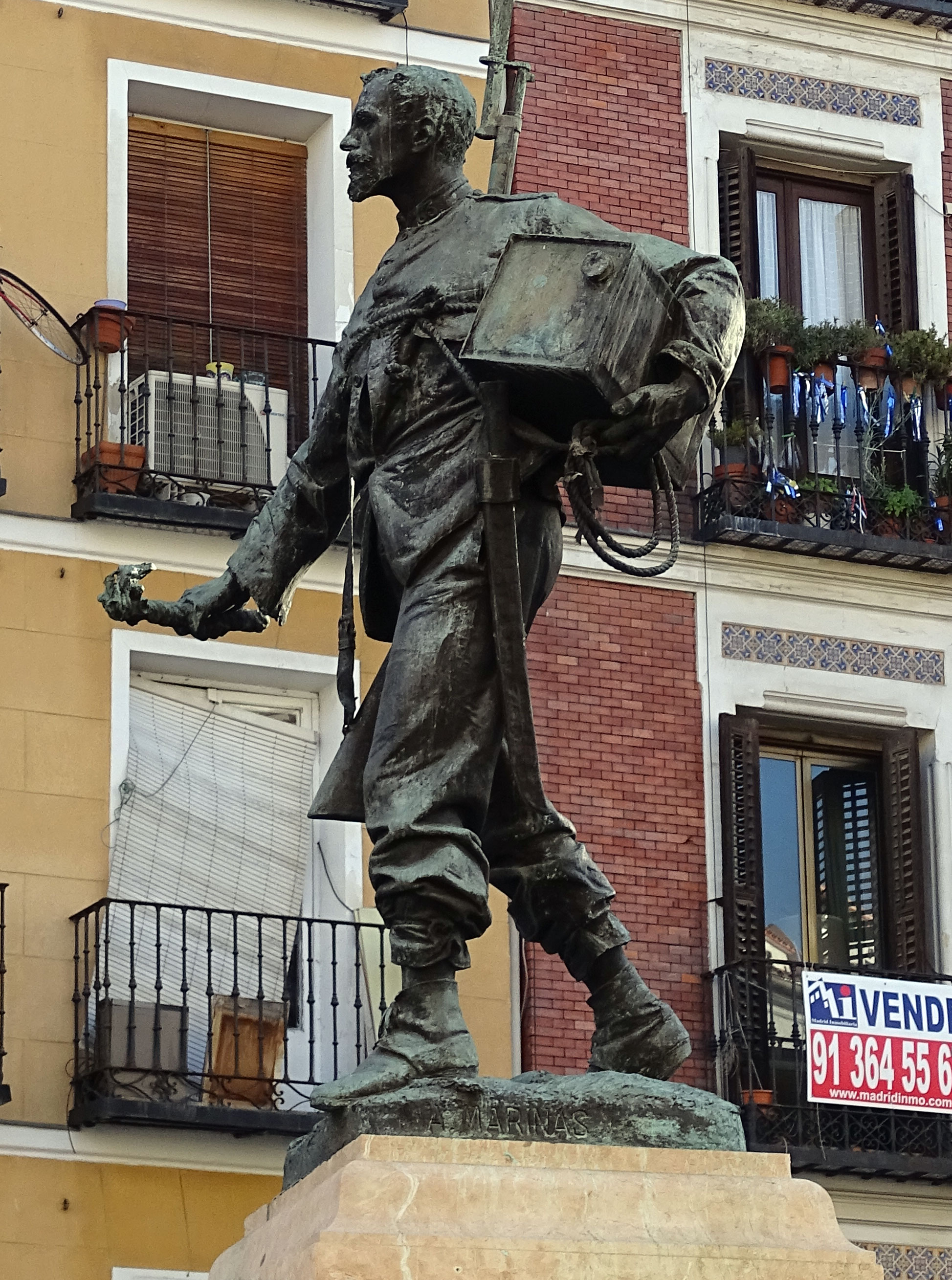
- 40°24′37″N 3°42′26″W
- Location: Plaza de Cascorro, Madrid, Spain
- Designer: Aniceto Marinas (statue); José López Sallaberry (pedestal)
- Material: Bronze, marble, limestone
- Opening date: 5 June 1902
- Dedicated to: Eloy Gonzalo, the Hero of Cascorro

The Monument to Eloy Gonzalo is an instance of public art in Madrid, Spain. It is a monument dedicated to Eloy Gonzalo, the so-called Hero of Cascorro. Erected on the plaza de Cascorro, it consists of a bronze statue of the aforementioned Cuban War hero authored by Aniceto Marinas, put on a stone plinth.

== History and description ==
It is a monument dedicated to Eloy Gonzalo a Spanish soldier in the Cuban War independence who, in September 1896—during a siege by a party of about 2,500 Cuban mambises equipped with 70 mm battalion guns on a small regiment of Spanish soldiers garrisoned in the small village of Cascorro— reportedly volunteered to his superiors in a nearly suicidal mission to infiltrate the enemy lines and fire the hut used as a warehouse for the weaponry of the enemy. Reportedly equipped with a 10-liter gasoline can, a Mauser rifle, a torch and a rope (to tie himself allowing for the retrieval of his corpse in case he fell in action, as he was certain of) he succeeded against all odds, helping to demoralize the enemy until the lift of the siege by General Adolfo Jiménez Castellanos, only to die of dysentery in Matanzas in June 1897.

The bronze statue designed by Aniceto Marinas (cast in Barcelona at Masriera y Campins' foundry) represents a 2.30 metre full-body Eloy Gonzalo wearing the rayadillo uniform characteristic of the Spanish soldiers during the conflict, strapped at chest height by a rope, wielding a flaming torch with his right hand while he holds the oil can with his left arm, also carrying a rifle and a machete. The plinth, made of marble and white stone, was designed by José López Sallaberry.

The opposing sides of the pedestal feature two inscriptions reading "el ayuntamiento de madrid a eloy gonzalo, 1901" (the Ayuntamiento de Madrid to Eloy Gonzalo, 1901") and cascorro 1897, respectively.

It was unveiled at its original location at the Plaza de Cascorro—mentioned at the time as Plaza del Rastro—on 5 June 1902, matching it with the inauguration of a number of outdoor sculptures in Madrid on the occasion of the celebrations for the coming of age of King Alfonso XIII (delayed several times by bad weather), featuring notable figures such as Bravo Murillo, Agustín Argüelles, Lope de Vega, Francisco de Quevedo, and Goya.
