= El Rastro =

Open-air flea market in Madrid, Spain

Coordinates: 40°24′32″N 03°42′27″W

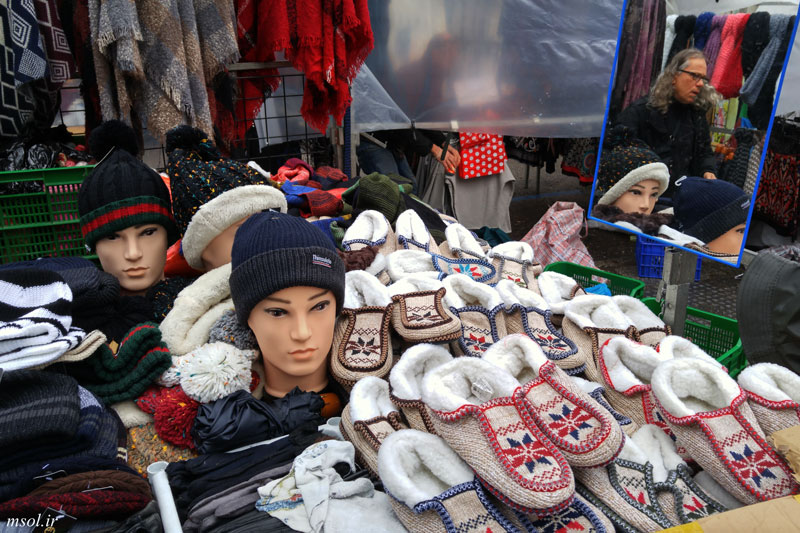

El Rastro de Madrid or simply el Rastro is the most popular open air flea market in Madrid (Spain). It is held every Sunday and public holiday during the year and is located along Plaza de Cascorro and Ribera de Curtidores, between Calle Embajadores and the Ronda de Toledo (just south of La Latina metro station).

A great variety of products (new and used) can be found at el Rastro. A number of antique shops in the local area are also open on Sunday.

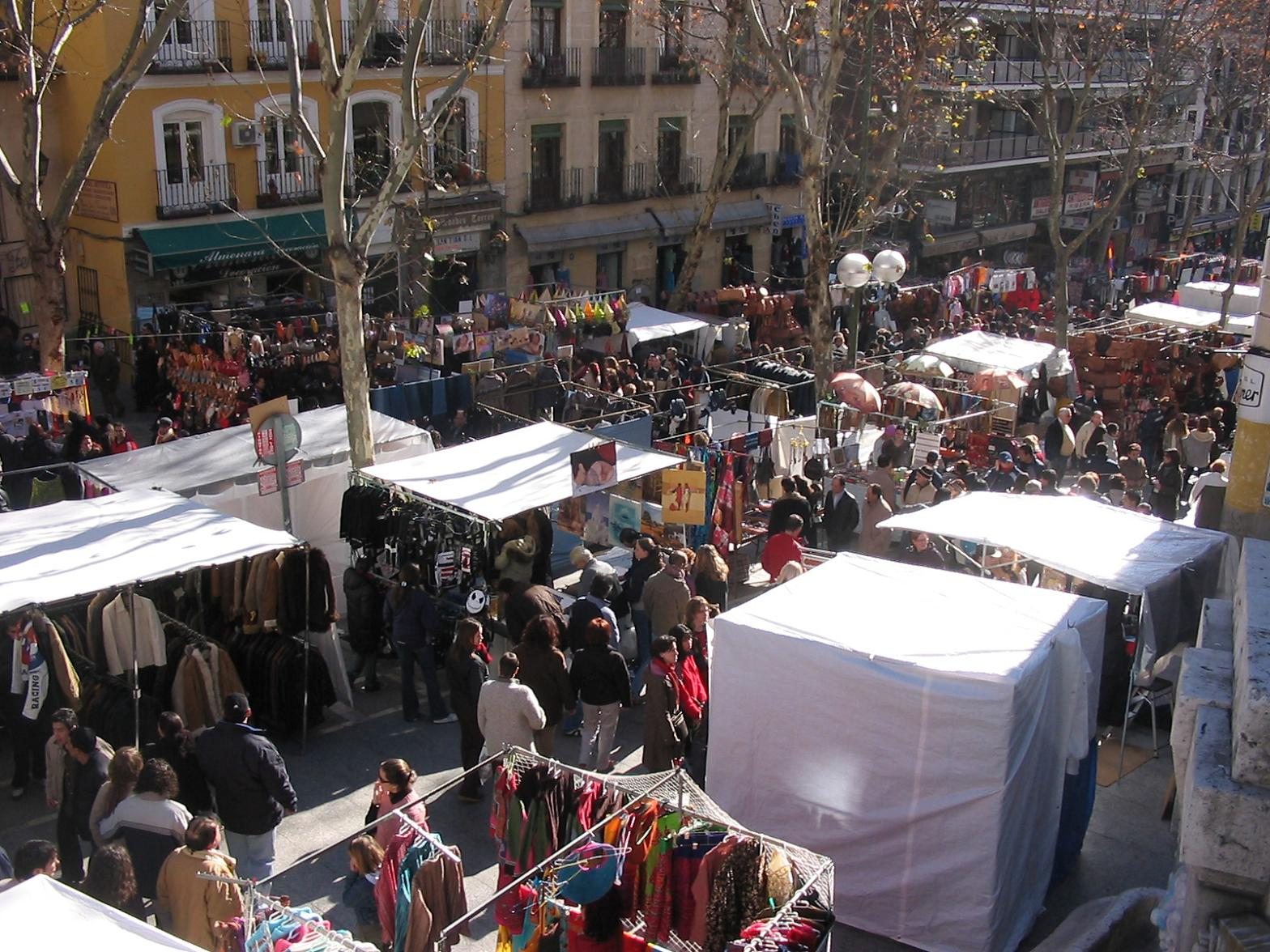
Typical picture of Ribera de Curtidores, main street of el Rastro de Madrid. January 2005

== Etymology ==
El Rastro means "the trail". The market probably owes its name to the tanneries that were once located on the Ribera de Curtidores (Ribera de Curtidores means 'riverside of tanners'). There was a slaughterhouse nearby at the present-day location of the Puerta de Toledo from the 17th to 20th century. Transporting the slaughtered cattle from the slaughterhouse to the tannery left a trail (rastro) of blood along the street. An alternative etymology suggests el Rastro once meant "outside", referring to the fact el Rastro was once outside the jurisdiction of the mayor's court.

== Location and times ==
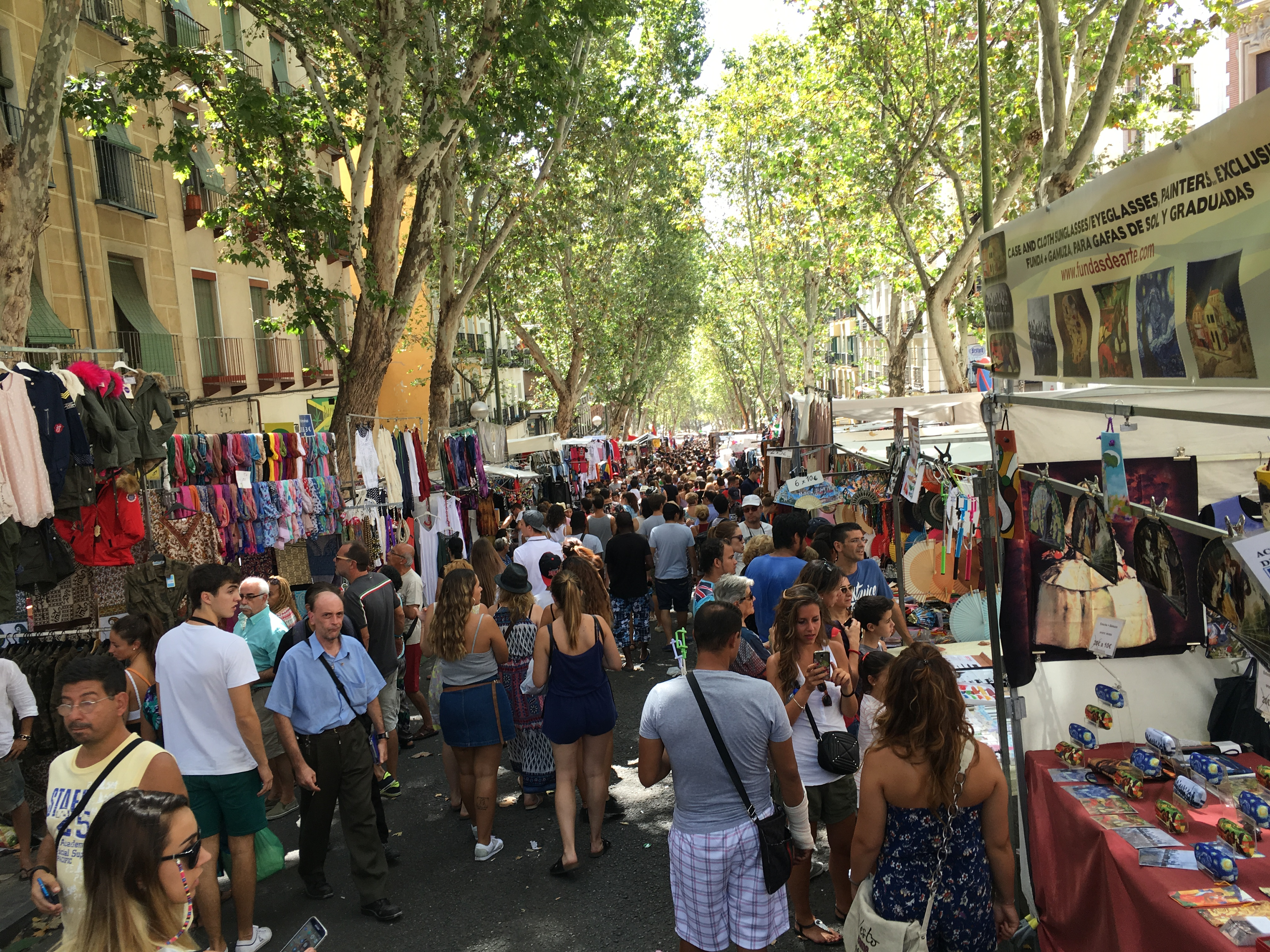
The market in 2016

According to municipal rules, the Rastro takes place every Sunday and on official public holidays, from 9 am to 3 pm, in the barrio de Embajadores (Ambassador's neighborhood) in the Central District of Madrid. The Madrid town council regulates the markets. A maximum of 3500 stalls cover the area from the Plaza de Cascorro, with its statue dedicated to Eloy Gonzalo, who was a Spanish soldier who fought in the Cuban War of Independence in which he distinguished himself and is regarded as a hero, in the north, along the main thoroughfare of Ribera de Curtidores and adjoining streets to Calle Embajadores in the east and the Ronda de Toledo and Plaza del Campillo del Mundo Nuevo in the south.

During the COVID-19 pandemic in the Community of Madrid, it was closed for several months. Sellers and the city government could not agree how to open while keeping the disease prevention measures.

== Transport ==
El Rastro can be accessed from the following Madrid Metro stations:

- Line 3 from the stations Embajadores, Lavapiés or Sol.
- Line 5 from the stations La Latina, Puerta de Toledo or Acacias.
- Line 1 from the stations Tirso de Molina or Sol.
- Line 2 from the stations Sol or Opera.

On market days, there are EMT (Empresa Municipal de Transportes de Madrid) buses that stop close by. It is also accessible from the commuter train network (Cercanías Renfe) from the following stop:

- Embajadores

== Description ==
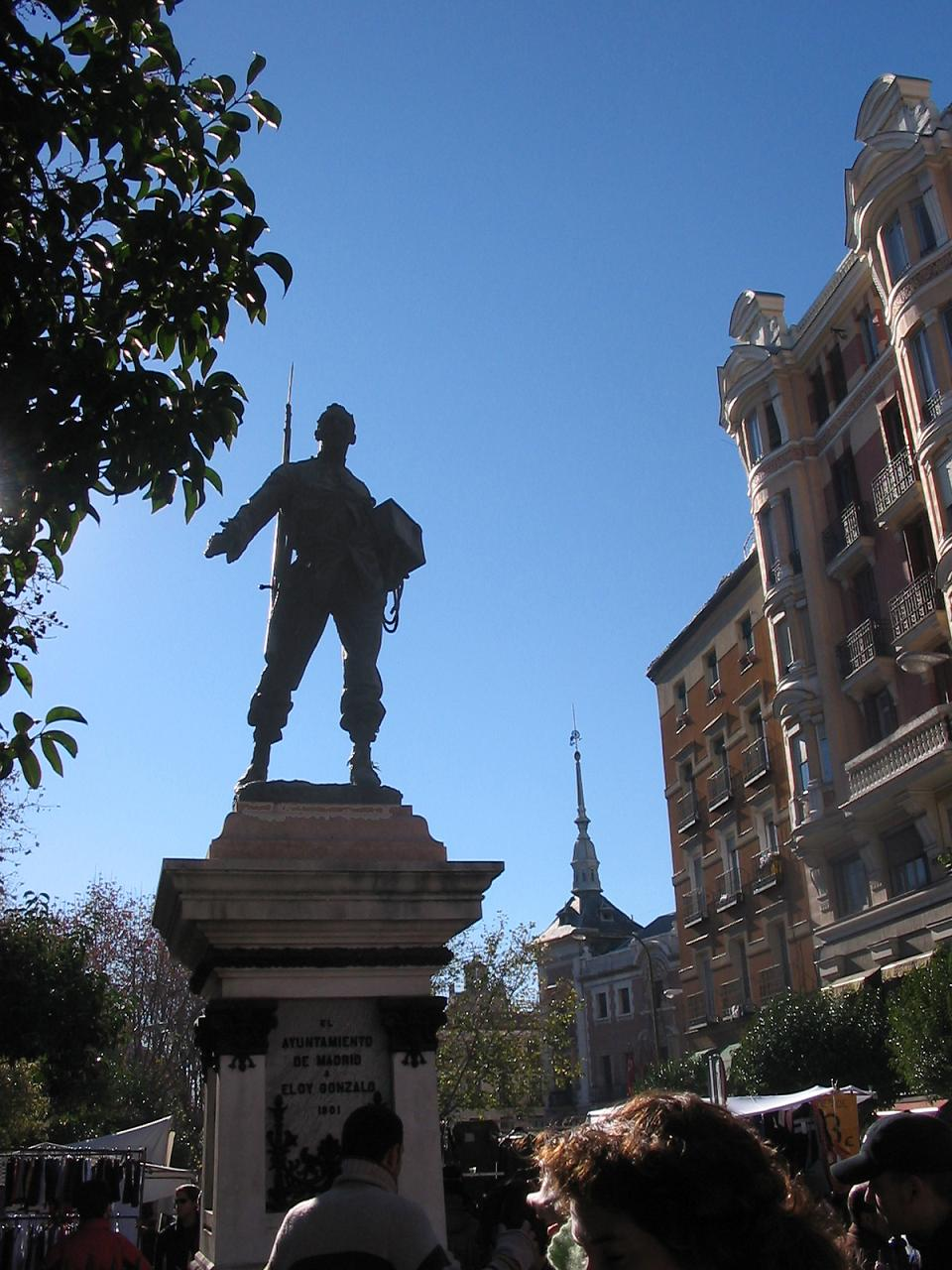
Statue of Eloy Gonzalo in the Plaza de Cascorro.

According to the German writer Hans Magnus Enzensberger, el Rastro is the final border between Europe and Africa, comprising diverse peoples from different countries and of differing ethnicities all searching for curiosities or bargains, sightseeing, sampling the gastronomic delights of Madrid or simply soaking up the atmosphere. Traditionally, the wares for sale are items not available in shops or malls, such as antiques, rarities, curiosities.

=== Schedule ===
El Rastro's promotional page advises those wanting a "tourist experience" to go to el Rastro at 11am, as this when the market is busiest. Those wishing to haggle for a bargain in the stalls should be at the market a little earlier, between 9 and 10am. The crowds usually begin to thin around midday, as people head for the bars at the edges of the market and around La Plaza de Cascorro for a drink and some tapas. The stalls gradually shut and by 3 or 4 pm (depending if it is winter or summer).

=== Specialty items ===
Certain streets or areas within El Rastro are associated, either by tradition or by the gathering of specialist stalls, with particular wares:

- Calle Fray Ceferino Gonzales is known as "calle de los Pájaros" ('street of the birds') as it was where pedlars and travelling sellers would sell domestic animals and birds and associated paraphernalia.
- Calle San Cayetano is also known as "calle de los Pintores" ('street of the Painters'), as its permanent stalls sell paintings, drawings and art supplies.
- Stalls around calle Rodas and the Plaza de General Vara del Rey (formerly Plaza de Antonio Zozaya) and Plaza de Campillo del Mundo Nuevo specialise in buying and selling magazines, trading cards and stamps. A frequent sight in this area is young children swapping and trading with each other.
- Calle Carnero and calle Carlos Arniches are where bouquinistas sell old, rare and collectible books.
- The Plaza de Cascorro specialises in selling funky clothing and accessories.

== El Rastro in popular culture ==
=== Cinema ===
In 1945 Edgar Neville directed Domingo de Carnaval, a lively detective movie set in el Rastro. It also featured in the movie Laberinto de Pasiones (1982) by well-known Spanish director Pedro Almodóvar.

=== Literature ===
Ramón Gómez de la Serna dedicated a book, El Rastro to the market. The writer and journalist Pedro de Répide Gallegos wrote a novel called Del Rastro a Maravillas.

=== Music ===
In the seventies the singer Patxi Andión made famous the song "Una, Dos y Tres" (One, Two and Three) whose chorus was "Una dos y tres, una dos y tres, lo que usted no quiera para el rastro es".

In the early days of his career, the singer El Fary recorded and pressed his own records and sold them himself in el Rastro

Olvido Gara, better known by the stage name Alaska, spent many of the early years of her career in el Rastro, during el rollo (later renamed la Movida Madrileña). The Spanish singer Joaquín Sabina mentioned el Rastro in his song "Con la Frente Marchita" from his album Mentiras Piadosas and also in his song "Dieguitos y Mafaldas".

In the Hombres G song, "Indiana", David Summers mentions "Voy al Rastro a cambiar los cromos de tu colección del álbum...".

== See also ==
- Barrio de La Latina
