= Mañeru =

Municipality of Spain

Coordinates: 42°40′N 1°51′W

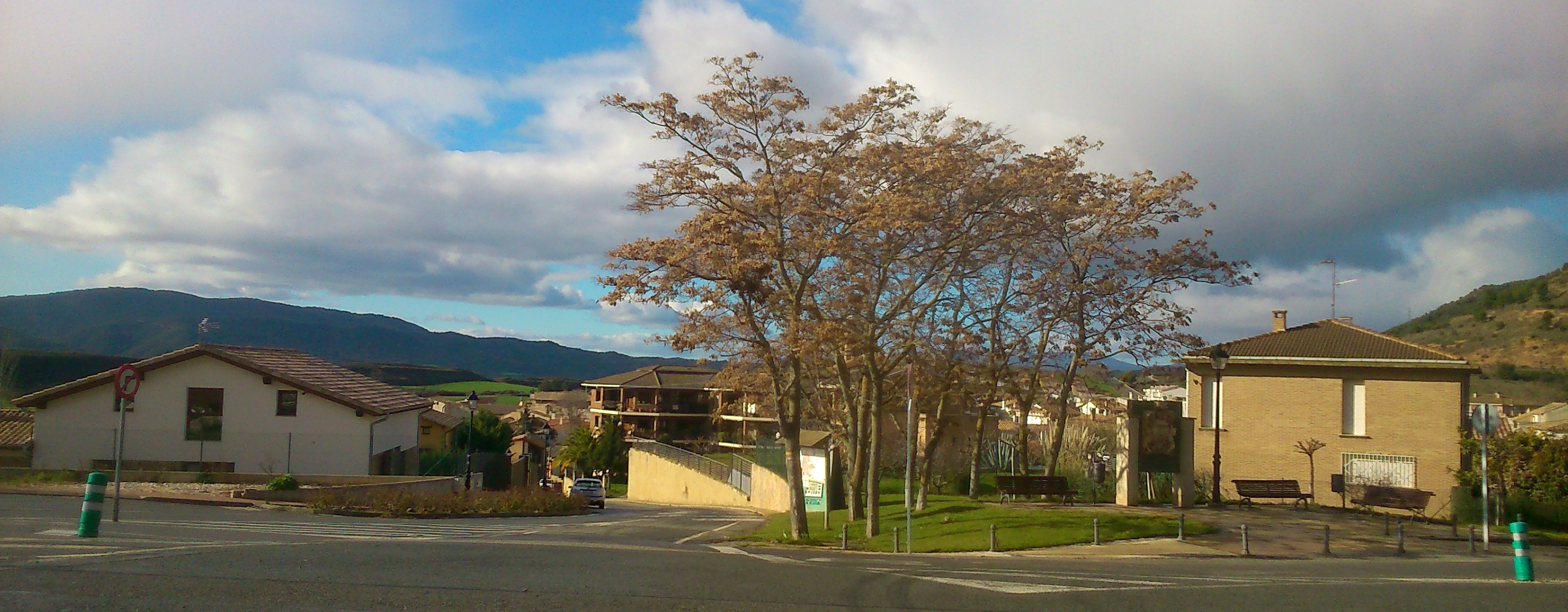
Street of Mañeru, Navarra, Spain

Mañeru is a small village and municipality located in the province and autonomous community of Navarre, northern Spain.

== Demography ==
From:INE Archiv
