= Monument to Daoiz and Velarde (Segovia) =

Monument in Segovia

Daoiz and Velarde
- Daoiz y Velarde
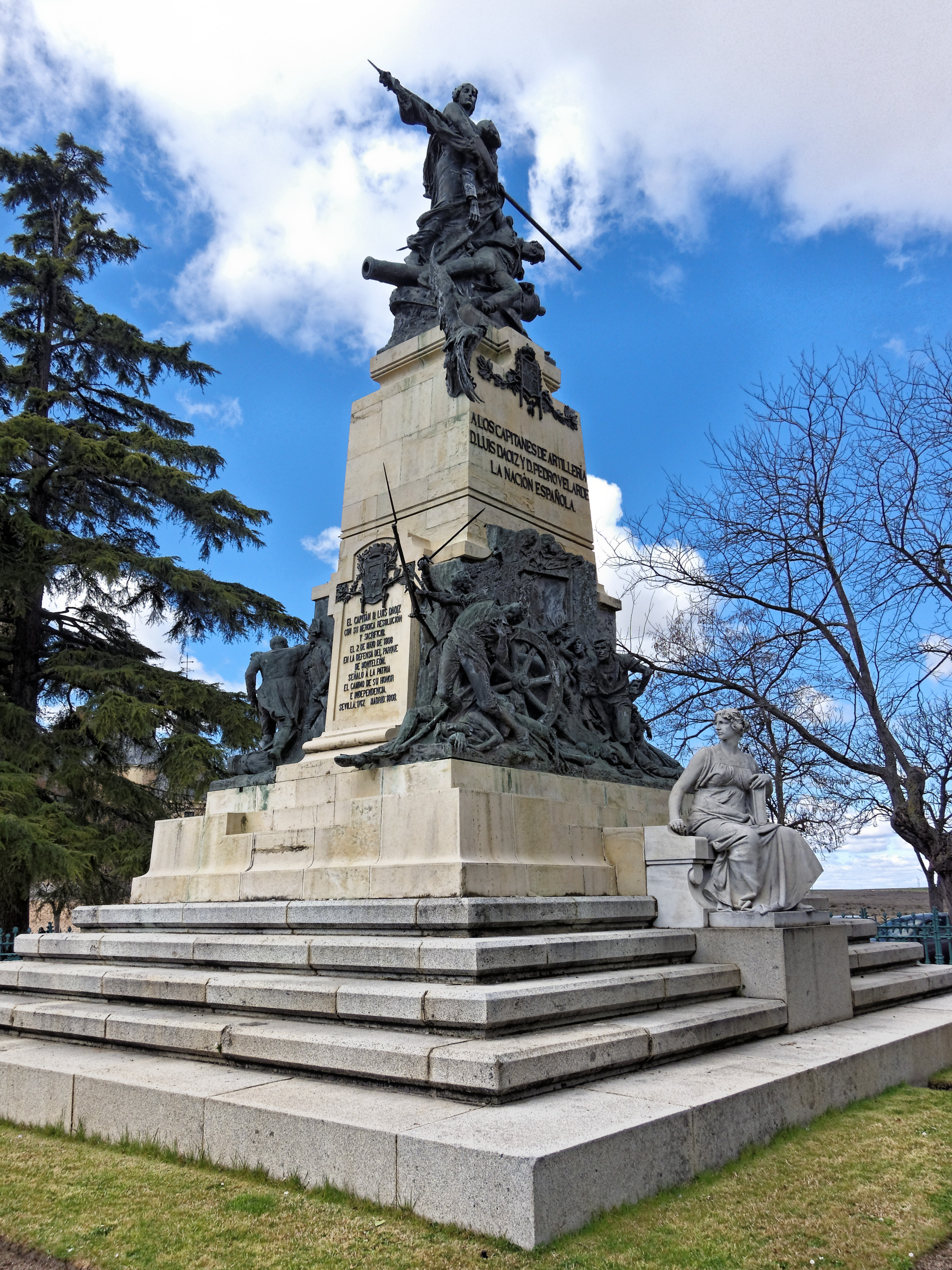
- 40.952257°N 4.130956°W
- Location: Segovia, Spain
- Designer: Aniceto Marinas (sculptor); Toribio García de Andrés (architect)
- Material: Bronze, limestone, marble, granite
- Opening date: 15 July 1910
- Dedicated to: Luis Daoíz y Torres and Pedro Velarde y Santillán

The Monument to Daoiz and Velarde (Spanish: Monumento a Daoiz y Velarde) is an instance of public art in Segovia, Spain. Designed by Aniceto Marinas, it is a memorial to Luis Daoiz y Torres and Pedro Velarde y Santillán, two Spanish artillery officers who fell fighting against the French army at the 1808 Dos de Mayo Uprising, in the context of the Peninsular War. It is located near the Alcázar of Segovia.

== History and description ==
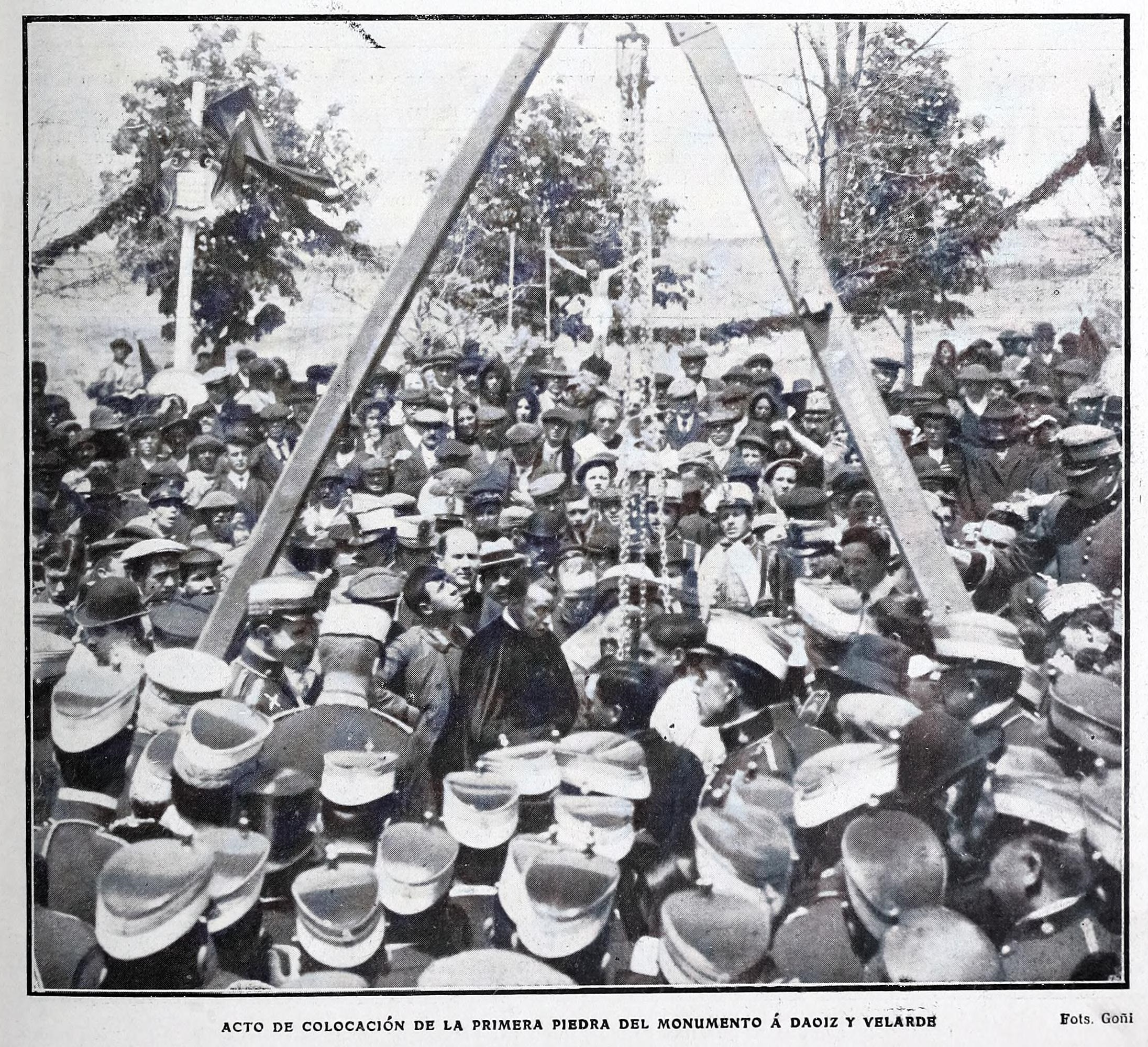
The laying of the foundation stone on 6 May 1908 (Blanco y Negro, 9 May 1908).

The laying of the foundation stone was held on 6 May 1908, on the occasion of the festivities taking place in early May for the 100th anniversary of the Dos de Mayo uprising.

Following the chronicle by Carlos Luis de Cuenca, the monument can be described as follows: it occupies an area of 242 square metres in the Plaza de la Reina Victoria, in front of the Alcázar of Segovia, and it is enclosed by a fence cast in the workshops of Trubia.

The first body of the pedestal lies in the centre of a wide platform with granite steps. It supports robust mouldings on which the frustum emerges. The sides of the pedestal are ornamented by two large reliefs and by two plaques displaying the coats of arms of Seville (Daoíz's homeland), and Santander (Velarde's homeland) and the respective commemorative inscriptions. An allegory of History lies on the steps of the pedestal; it is sculpted on white marble, contrasting with a bronze relief depicting the last stand at the Monteleón artillery barracks. The other relief shows Daoiz rallying the people of Madrid, engaged in a desperate struggle against the French troops.

The allegorical figure of Spain tops off the monument, holding the dying bodies of the two artillerymen in her arms, wrapped in the national flag. In the lower part there is an eagle, clutching the rock with one of its claws, fighting to pull out the flag with the other claw.

Toribio García de Andrés worked in the basement's building works.

The monument was unveiled on 15 July 1910 by Alfonso XIII.

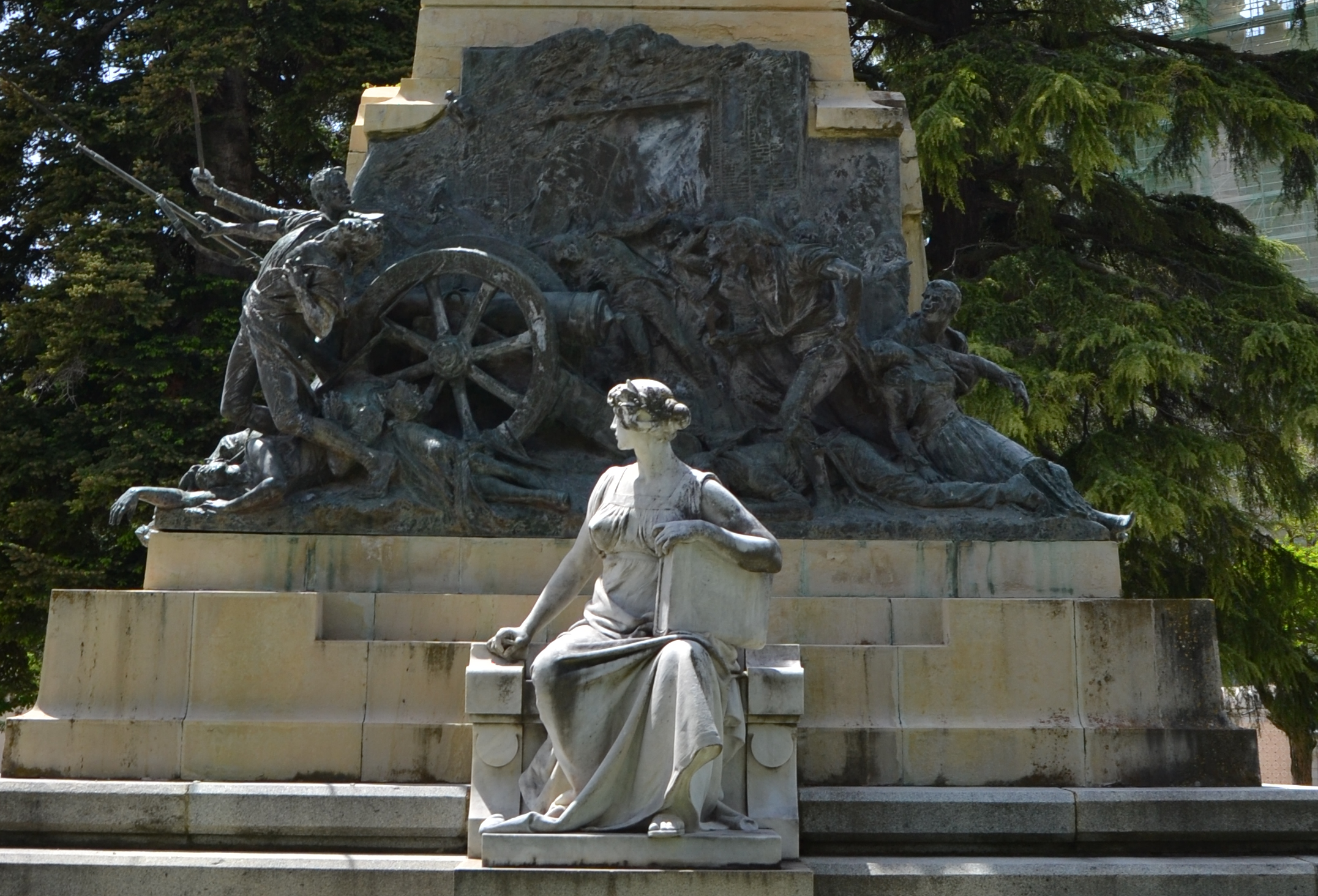
Front side relief an allegory of History

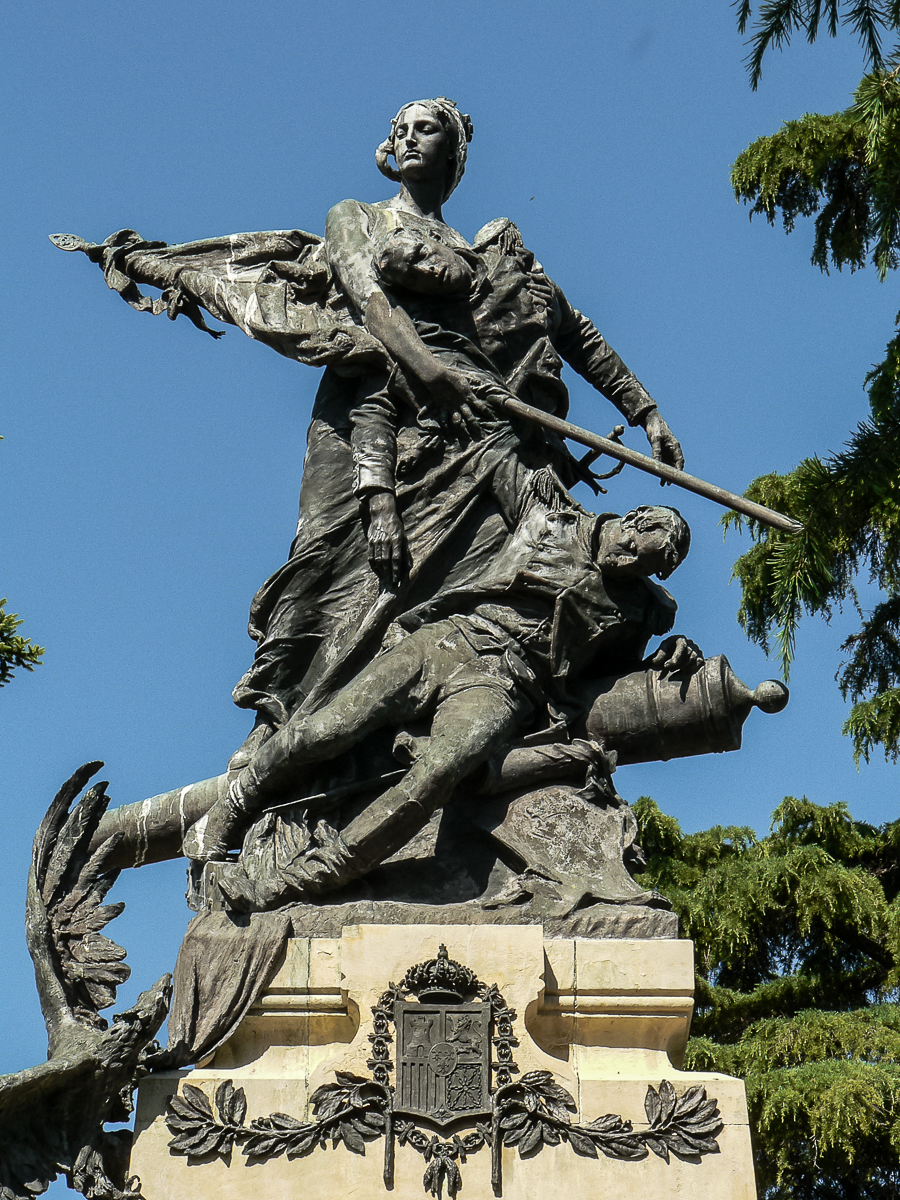
Sculptural group topping off the monument

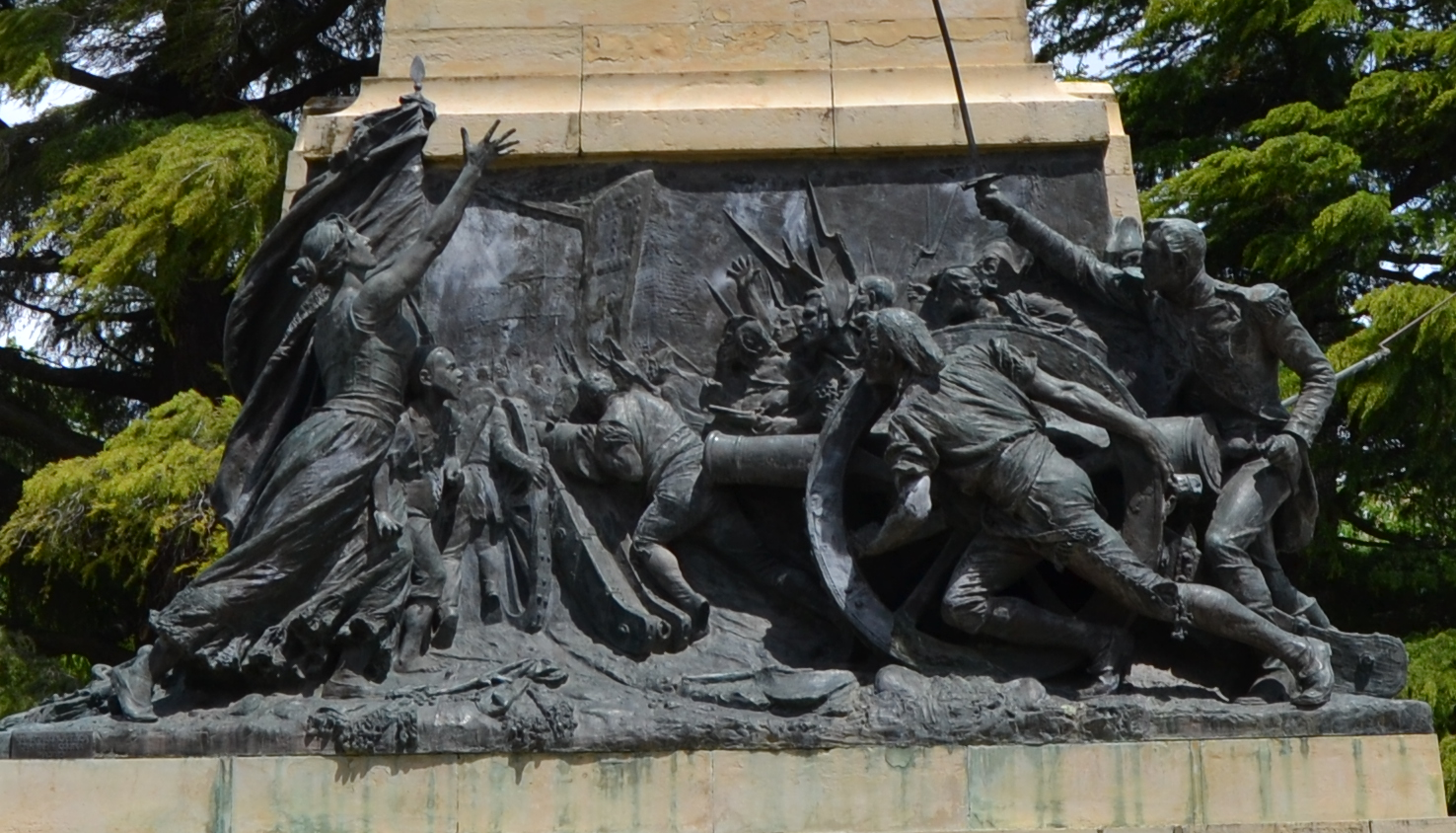
Back side relief
