= Manuel Ruiz Guerrero =

Spanish Painter

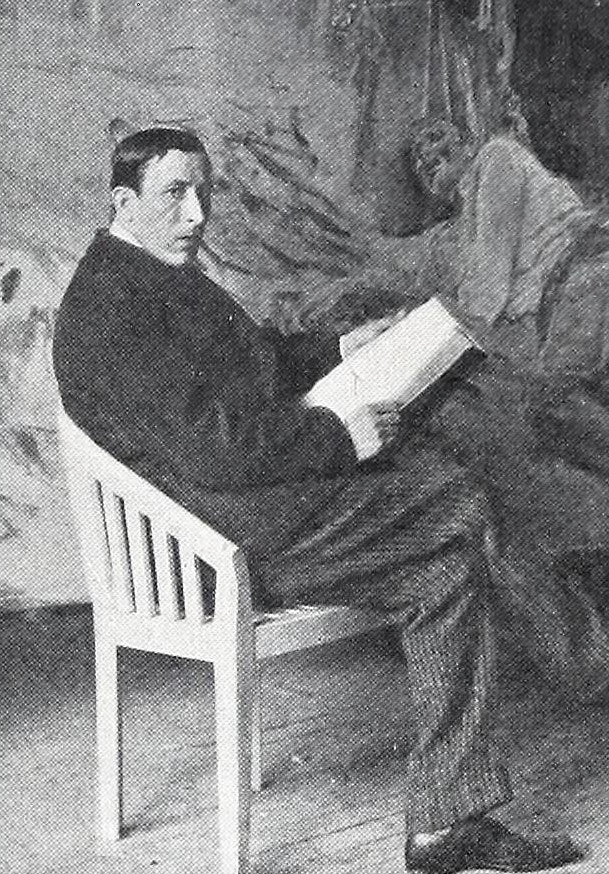
- Born: 1864; Granada
- Died: 1917 (aged 52–53); Madrid
- Known for: Paintings and Illustrations

Manuel Ruiz Guerrero (Granada, 1864 – Madrid 1917) was a Spanish painter and illustrator.

== Granada and Rome ==
Ruiz Guerrero studied at the "Real Academia de Bellas Artes de Nuestra Señora de las Angustias" ("Royal Academy of Fine Arts of Our Lady of Sorrows"), in Granada, (Note: Madrasa of Granada, Calle Oficios, 14, founded in 1777.) with Eduardo García Guerra. (Note: (Granada 1827–1893) Spanish painter who studied in the “Real Academia de Bellas Artes de San Fernando”, in Madrid, with Federico de Madrazo, Carlos Luis de Ribera, and Charles Gleyre.)

In 1881 he won a scholarship from the Provincial Council of Granada to study in Rome. The scholarship was renewed in 1884 and the conditions involved sending artworks back to the council. Amongst these were:

- Copy of “El testamento de Isabel la Católica” (“Queen Isabella I of Castile dictating her will”) (Note: At the Prado Museum,) by Eduardo Rosales, in 1882.
- Copy of “La prisión del Príncipe de Viana” (“Prince of Viana’s Prison”) (Note: At the Prado Museum,) by Emilio Sala, in 1883.
- “Idilio” (“Ydill”), in 1884.
- “Napolitana con su hijo” (“Neapolitan woman with her son”) in 1886.
- “Resurrexit, non est hic”, which was included in the 1887 “National Exhibition of Fine Arts”.

In 1884 he submitted “Una procesión en Granada” (“A procession in Granada”) to the “National Exhibition of Fine Arts”.

In December 1884 there was an earthquake in Granada and Ruiz Guerrero together with other painters created a Watercolourists Society. They exhibited their artworks to collect donations for the victims. The initiative gave way to the “Centro Artístico, Literario y Científico” (“Arts, Literature and Science Center”) in April the following year.

== Andalusia ==
In 1889 he took part in the exhibition held by the "Agrupación Española de Acuarelistas" ("Spanish Society of Watercolourists") in Madrid.

In 1892 he won the second medal at the “National Exhibition of Fine Arts” with “La sopa” (“The soup”).

In 1896 he traveled around the province of Granada. The paintings of his tour were at the Corpus Christi Exhibition, (Note: The Corpus Christi are the annual fiestas celebrated in Granada with a wide variety of events involving arts and entertainment.)organised by the “Centro Artístico, Literario y Científico de Granada”.

In 1898 he presented “Mala tarde” (“Bad afternoon”) and “Una juerga” (“A party”) to the 6th Bienal of the “Círculo de Bellas Artes”, in Madrid.

In 1899 he made contributions for “La vida literaria”, a magazine directed by Jacinto Benavente that only lasted between January and August that year. He was also a jury member at the “National Exhibition of Fine Arts”.

== 20th century ==
In the Winter of 1900, he traveled to Biscay, possibly attracted by the works by Paul Gauguin, Ignacio Zuloaga and Pablo Picasso, shown at the first "Modern Art Exhibition" in Bilbao. (Note: In all, six exhibitions took place until 1910. Plenty local artists, eager to create better conditions for the art market, exhibited their artworks together with Catalonian, French and Belgian ones. These international exhibitions were the origins of the first scholarships by the provincial council in 1907, the Fine Arts Museum of Bilbao in 1908, and the "Asociación de Artistas Vascos]" ("Basque Artists Association") in 1911.) In the Summer, he settled in Malaga, to work on commissions for Paris, Bilbao, and Madrid.

He was an art professor at the “Real Academia de Bellas Artes de San Telmo de Malaga” (“Royal Fine Arts Academy of San Telmo of Malaga”) which had been founded in 1849.

His choice of subject during the first years focused on the highly demanded representation of peasants and historical themes. Around 1890 it evolved towards more realistic genre scenes of his natal Andalusia. His paintings exude great technical resources.

Throughout his life he collaborated submitting charcoal drawings illustrations to the “Blanco y Negro” magazine. (Note: This publication was edited in Madrid between 1891 and 1988.) One example is "En San Antonio de la Florida". (Note: "En San Antonio de la Florida".Español: En San Antonio de la Florida. Vino a la verbena..)

He died in Madrid in 1917.

His paintings are scattered around in private collections and museums, mostly in Andalusia. The Bibataubín Palace, (Note: The provincial council headquarters of Granada since 1933) in Granada, holds a significant number of them.

== Notable paintings ==
- "Carrera del Darro y San Pedro"
- "Carrera del Darro"
- "Descanso en la recolecta" (“Rest of the harvest”)
- "El Palacio de la Madraza" (“The Palace of the Madraza”)
- "Estudio de rosas" (“Roses study”)
- "Guerrero en la corte de la Alhambra" (“Warrior at the Alhambra court”)
- "Juerga Flamenca" (“Flamenco party”)
- "Juerguistas" (“Partygoers”)
- "La Pepa"
- "La visita" (“The visit”)
- "Mercado de San Ildefonso" (“San Ildefonso market”)
- "Partida de cartas"
- "Pescadores"
- "Puente de las Chirimías"
- "Salida de la procesión"
- "Tabaqueras"
- "Un pueblo andaluz"
- "Vista del Darro desde la Plaza Nueva"

== Gallery ==
Paintings by Manuel Ruiz Guerrero

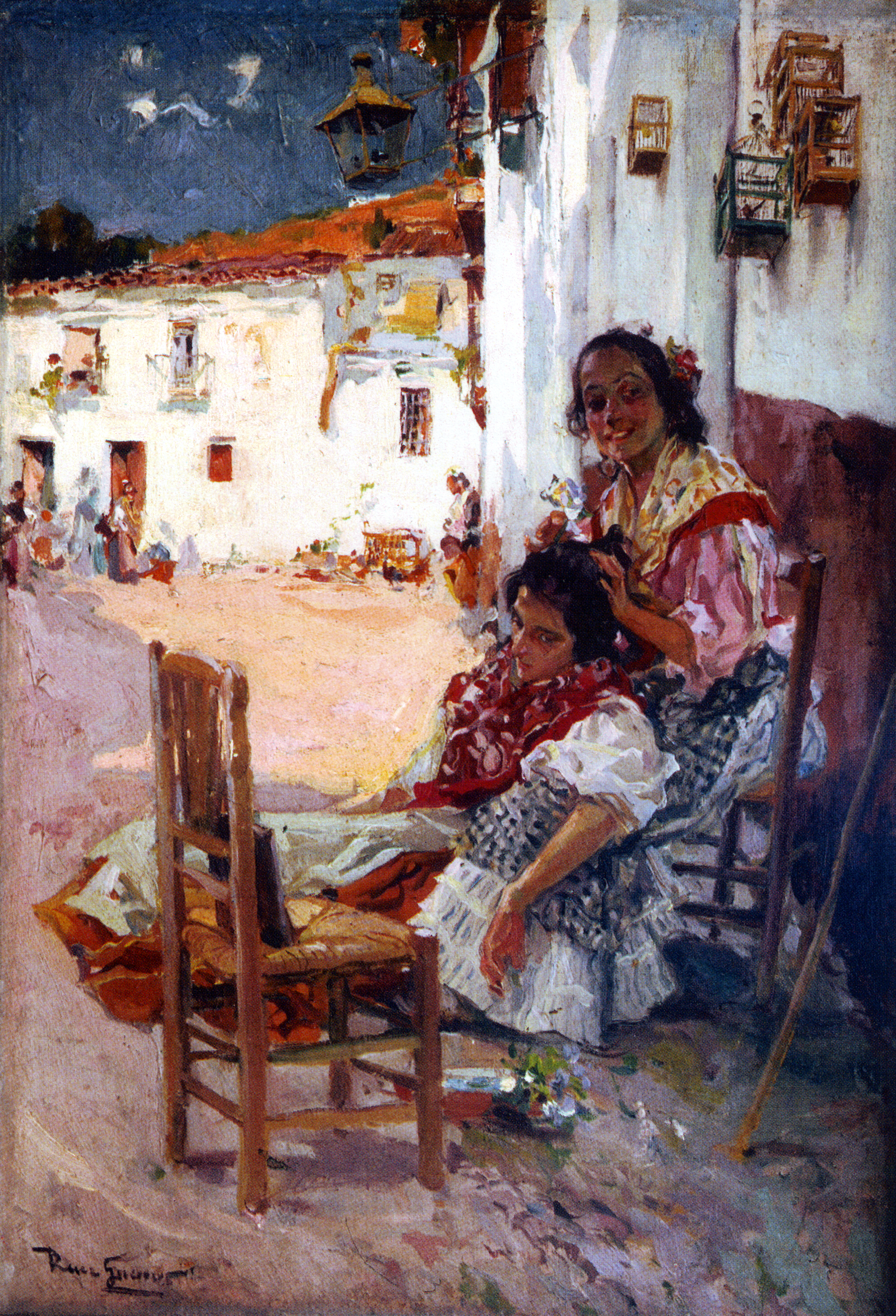
"Toilette al aire libre"

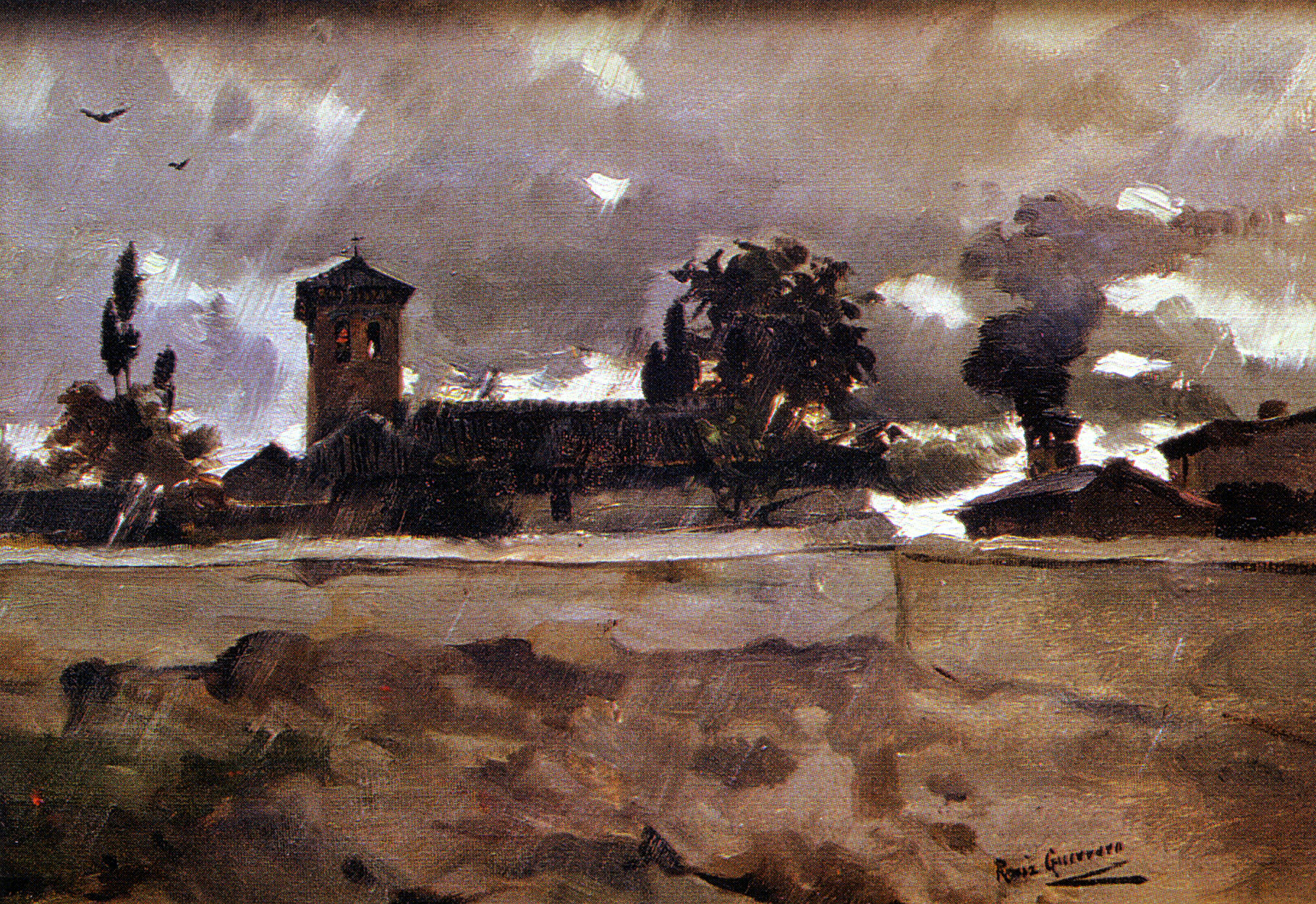
"The church of San Bartolomeo"

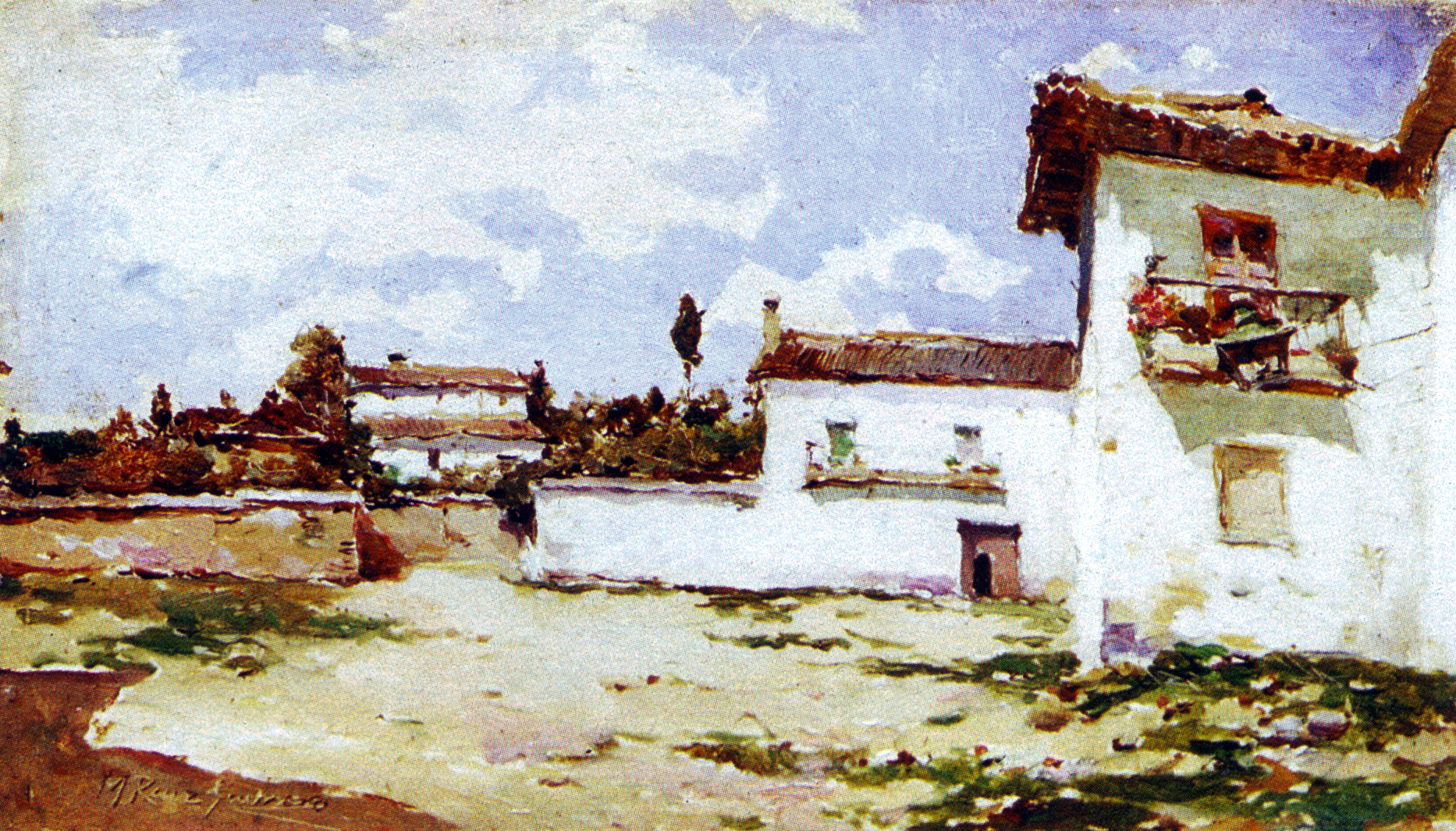
"A square in the Albaicin"

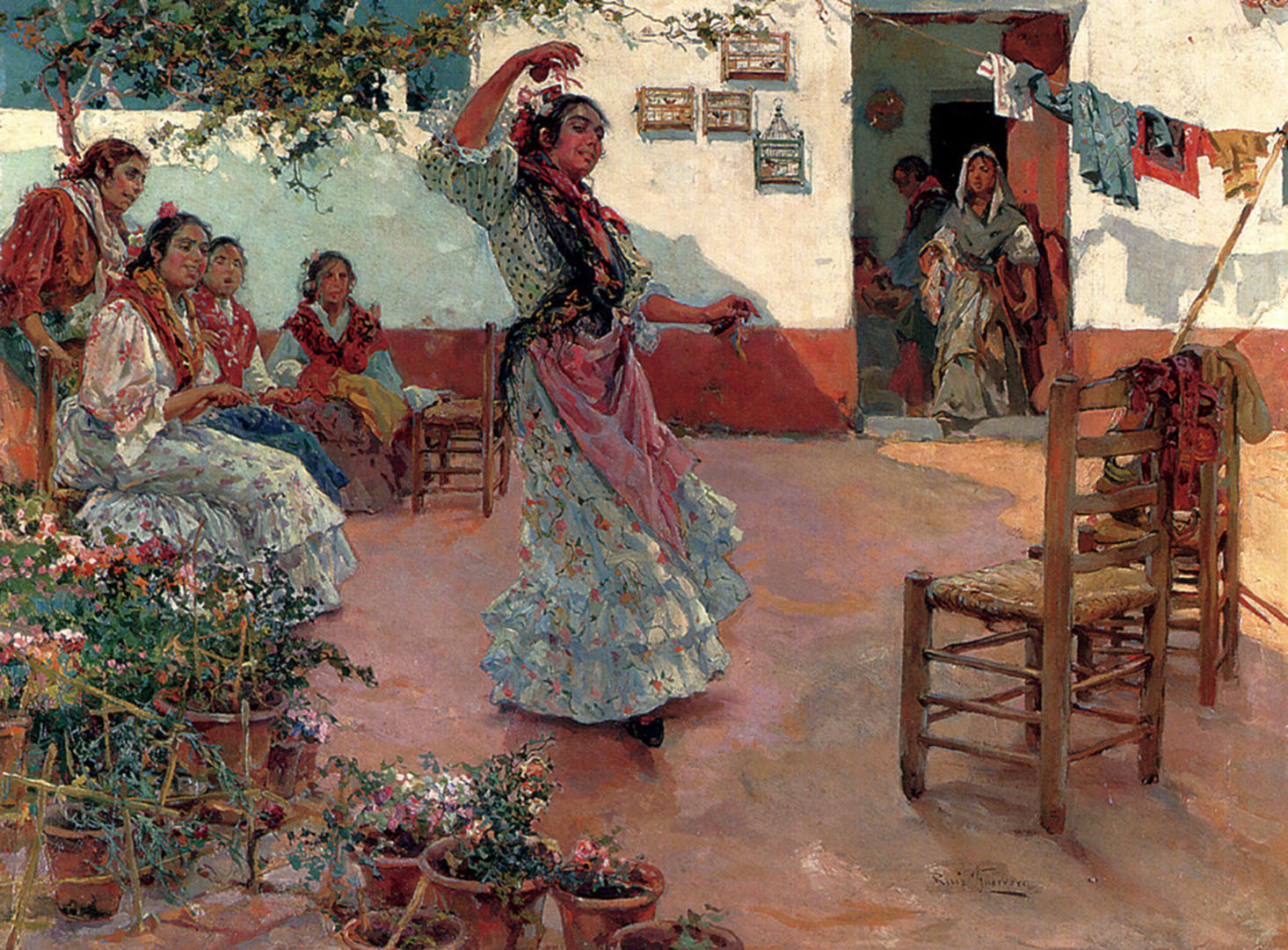
"El baile flamenco"

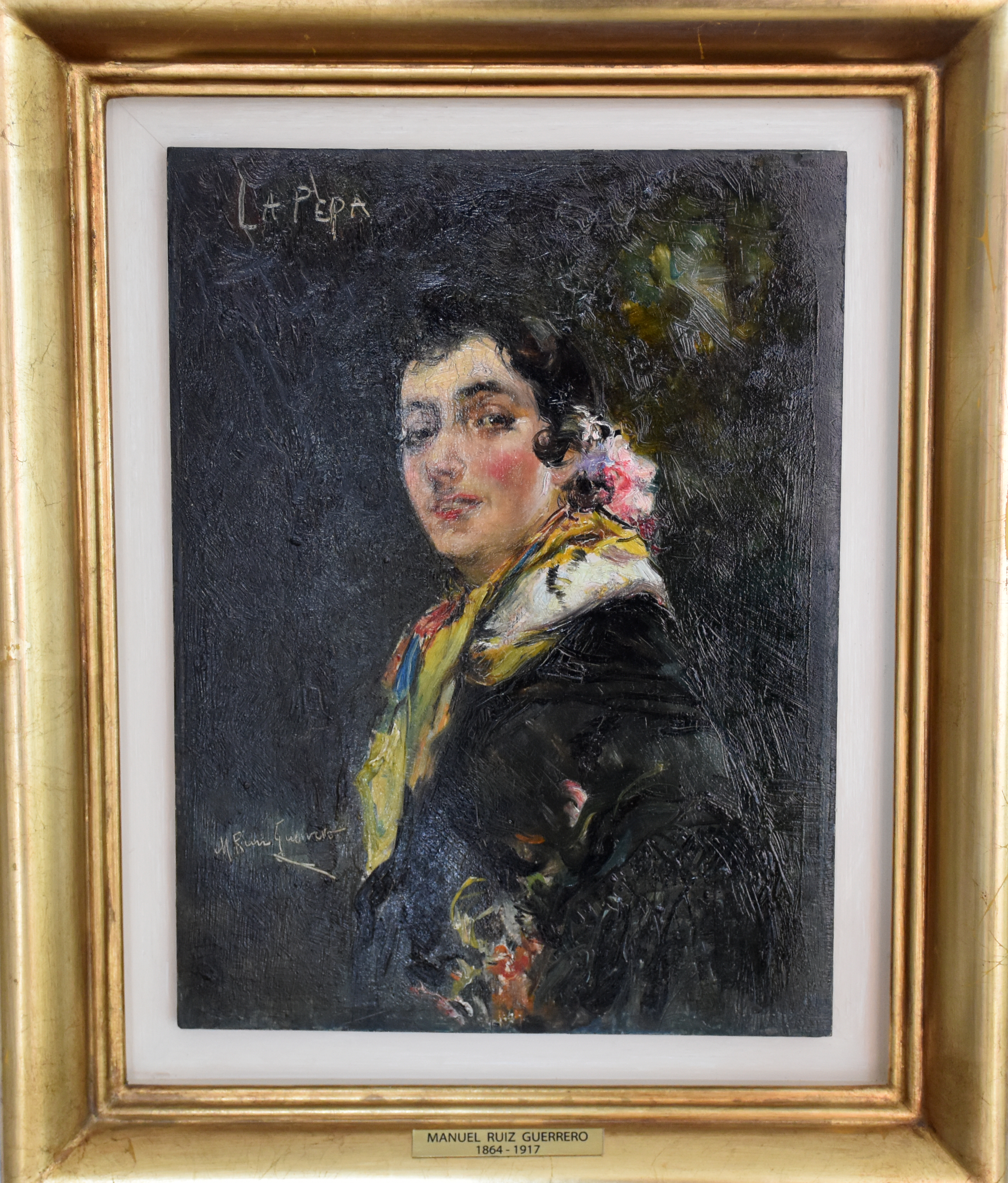
La Pepa

== Sources ==
- Mª Dolores Santos Moreno: “Pintura del siglo XIX en Granada: Arte y Sociedad”, pp. 1088–1093, University of Granada 1997.
- BBV and the Culture branch of the Andalusian Council: “Pintores Andaluces de la Escuela de Roma (1870–1900)”, Exhibition in the Provincial Historical Archive, Seville, Artegraf, Madrid 1989.
