= Caryatid Building =

Building in Madrid, Spain

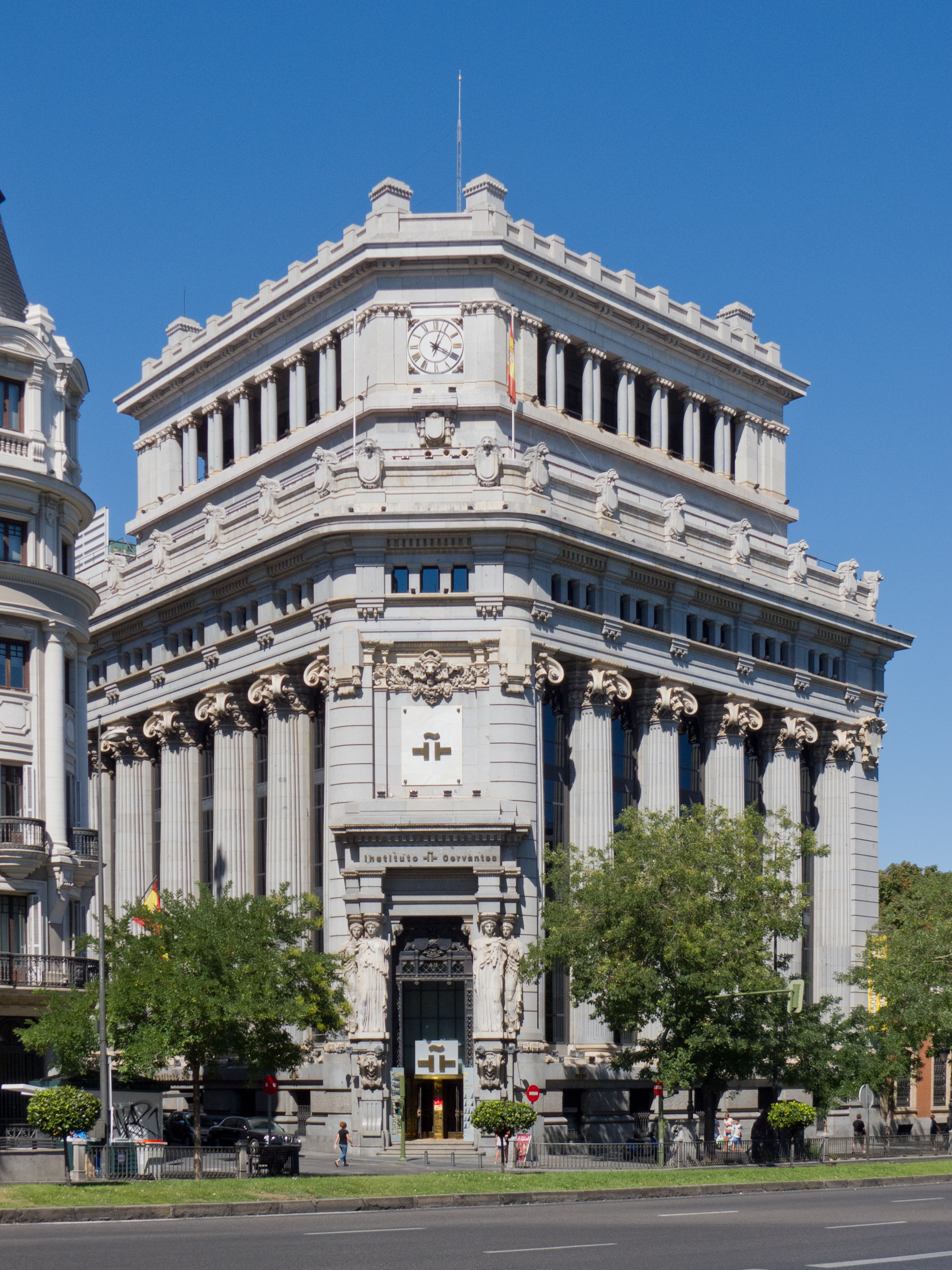
- Former names: Río de la Plata Bank
- Alternative names: Cervantes Building

General information
- Architectural style: Eclecticism
- Location: Madrid, Spain, Calle de Alcala, 49; 28014 Madrid
- Coordinates: 40.419356°N 3.695319°W
- Current tenants: Instituto Cervantes (October 11, 2006-)
- Construction started: 1911
- Completed: 1918
- Renovated: 1944-1953
- Owner: Government of Spain

Height
- Height: 25 meters

Technical details
- Floor count: 3
- Floor area: 18,000 m²

Design and construction
- Architects: Antonio Palacios; Joaquín Otamendi; Manuel Cabanyes
- Structural engineer: Ángel Chueca Sainz
- Other designers: Manuel Cabanyes

Edificio de Las Cariátides (English: Caryatid Building) is a building in the Spanish capital of Madrid built by the Spanish architect Antonio Palacios. The building was later the head office of the Central Bank and later of the Santander Bank. As of 2006 it is the headquarters of the Instituto Cervantes.

== History ==
Alcalá street, one of the oldest streets in Madrid, which starts at the Puerta del Sol, at the beginning of the 20th century, points to a relevant financial center in the city. The demolitions of the Nueva Gran Vía in 1911 already indicate the beginnings of important urban transformations in the capital. The collaboration of two young architects, initiated in 1904, already has several previous successes. The success of both engineers begins when winning adepts after winning in the municipal public contest of the Palace of Communications. It is noteworthy that the architecture of Madrid is dominated at the beginning of the 20th century by the existence of banks and churches. This building is a novelty that is the first office to be built in Madrid.

=== Construction ===
The caryatids above the main entrance

The Spanish architects Antonio Palacios Ramilo and Joaquín Otamendi received the commission to project the branch office of the Spanish Rio de la Plata Bank in 1910. Both are occupied in the construction process of the Palace of Communications and the Maudes Hospital. The new headquarters of the Bank acquired the 18,000 square meters of land belonging to the rectangular plot of the former Marqués de Casa-Irujo Palace. The building of the palace of Irujo, that gave rise to the lot, was highly praised in its time. On the ground floor was the Café Cervantes.

The contractor of the work was Celestino Madurell. One of the helpers of Palacios is Secundino Zuazo, who begins with this work to assist him. Precisely, just in front of his scaffolding, an attempt of murder was made on April 13, 1913, by King Alfonso XIII for the anarchist Sancho Alegre who shot him twice with his revolver.

The design of Palacios and Otamendi is done in such a way that the entrance to the building of the place to a spacious first floor. It follows the diaphanous model of the Works of Palaces, inspired by the American models of the time: great patio of operations. The remaining three floors are dedicated to offices. The large interior bays are made using metal beams that can be seen in the interior. Palacios with this work is reinforced in its success, by its luck and style receives diverse charges. Due to the relationship with the brothers Otamendi begins his studies in the first steps of the Metro of Madrid, during the construction of the Bank begins to design the entrances of the mouths and the accesses of the Madrilenian metro. On April 29, 1918, the building was inaugurated.

=== Hispanic Central Bank ===
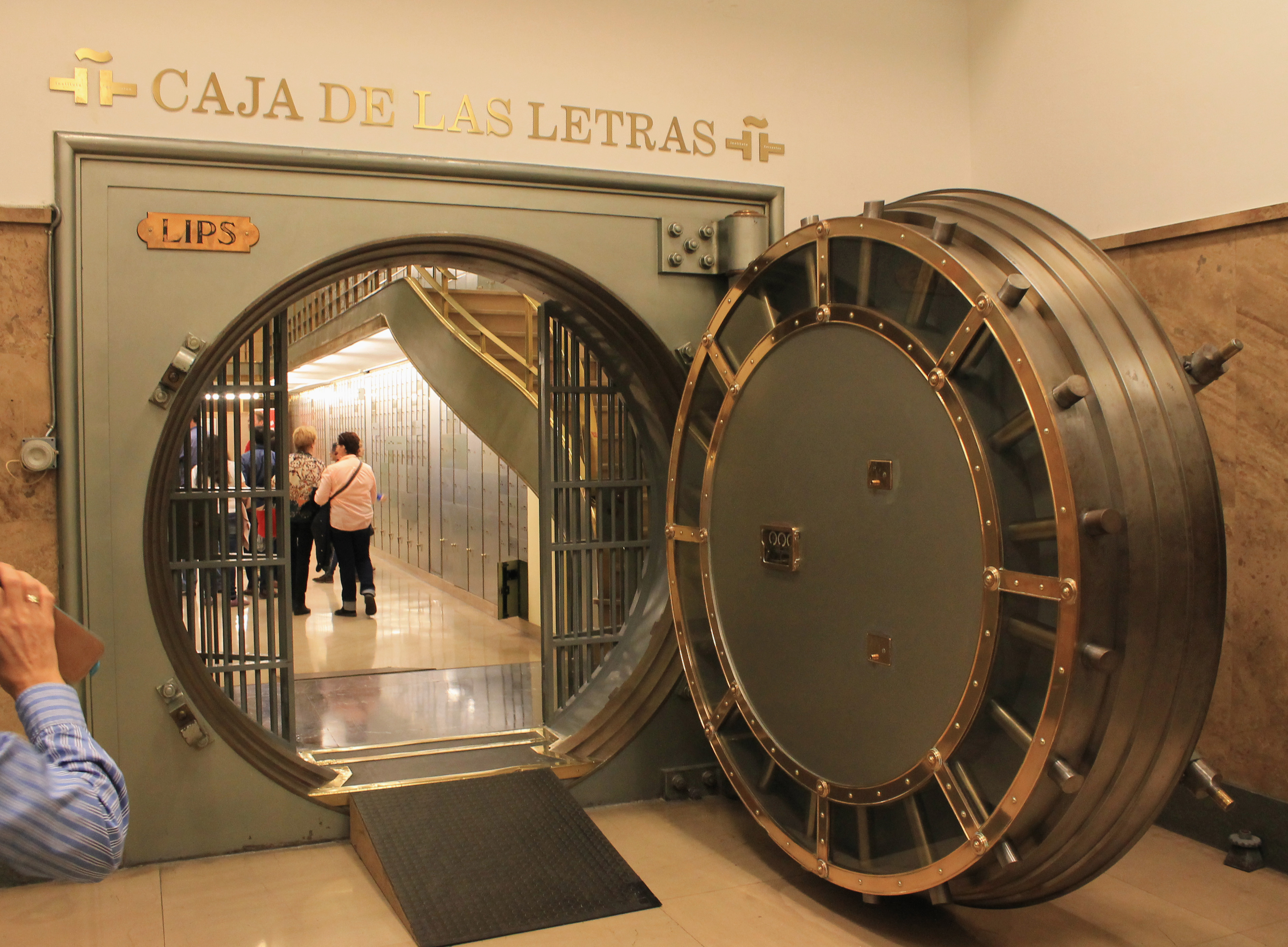
Old vault of the bank, current Caja de las Letras.

It was the main seat of the Banco Español del Río de la Plata, later the Central Bank (a private bank), after the merger with that one, in 1947. In the illustrations and photographs of the time you can see "CENTRAL BANK" at the crowning of the building. In the reforms missed the large central hall, and the view of the stained glass in the dome. It was at this time that the building was extended to Barquillo Street, by the architect Manuel Cabanyes, in a project that did not respect the continuity with the original. Since 1929 the building has been close to the Official College of Architects of Madrid.

After the merger of the Central Bank with the Banco Hispanoamericano, it became the headquarters of the new Banco Central Hispano (BCH). It then became part of Santander Group's assets as the two entities merged and was eventually sold to the Madrid City Council, which was subsequently exchanged with the Spanish government in 2003 in exchange for the Palacio de Comunicaciones (another building designed by Palacios). It is included in the Catalog of Protected Buildings of the General Urban Planning Plan of Madrid. This category includes those buildings that are considered of some relevance both in the history of art and in Spanish or Madrid architecture, or that are a milestone in the urban fabric of the city.

=== Cervantes Institute Headquarters ===
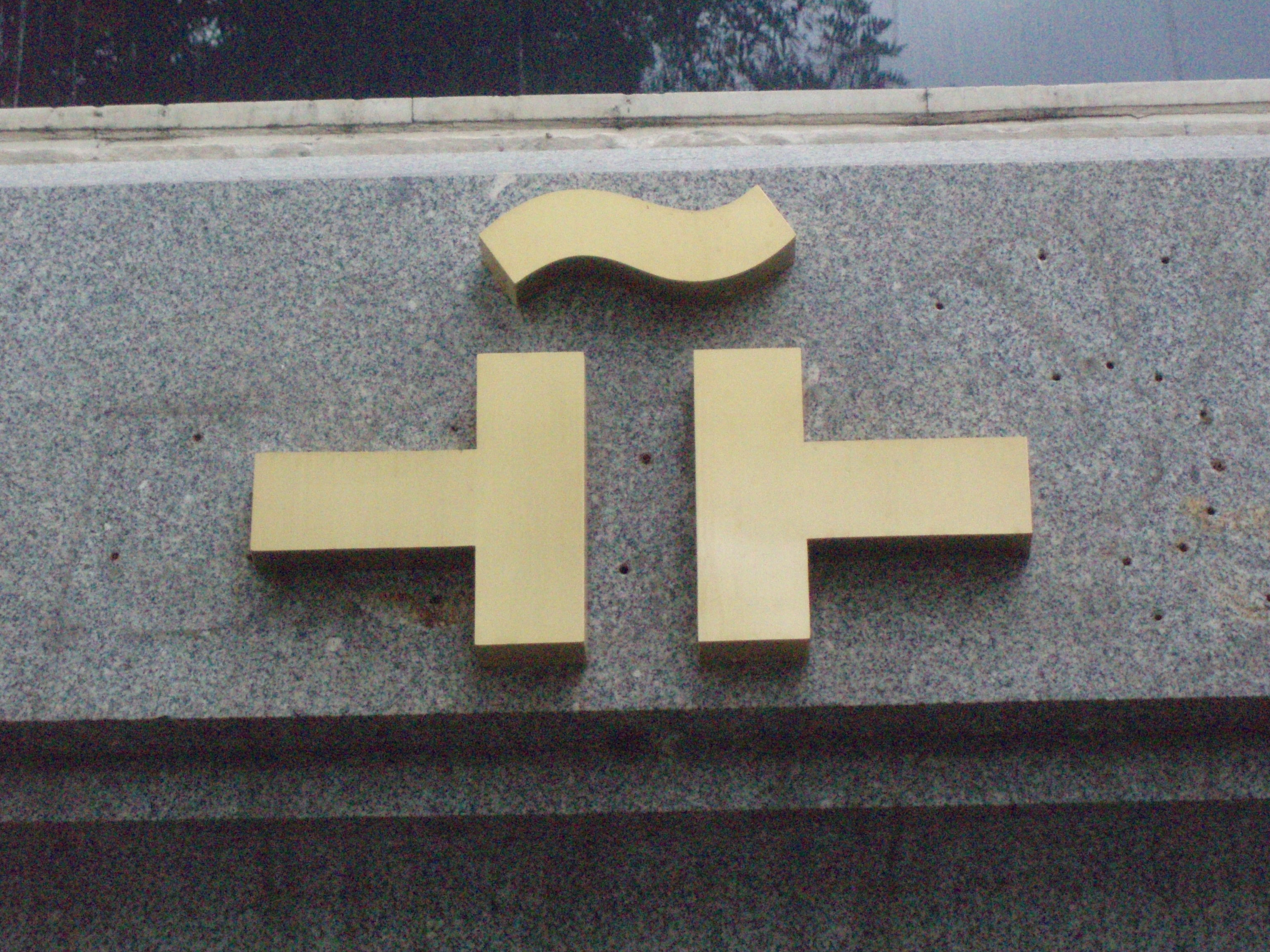
Logo of Cervantes Institute at the entrance of the building.

At the beginning of the 21st century, it became the first headquarters of the Cervantes Institute, a public cultural institution under the Ministry of Foreign Affairs of Spain, used as a center for exhibitions and for offices. The Cervantes Institute icon (designed by Enric Satué) is placed on the cover of the building, located between the caryatids in October 2006. On October 12, 2006, it was inaugurated by King Juan Carlos I and Queen Sofia. The second headquarters, which is used as a teacher training center, is located in the Colegio del Rey de Alcalá de Henares. The employees of various offices in Madrid, including those from the Palace of the Trinity, meet in the premises of this new building. The remodeled building will accommodate the offices that will attend the administration, the exhibition halls and an auditorium for a capacity of 1200 people.
