= Statue of Minerva (Madrid) =

Minerva
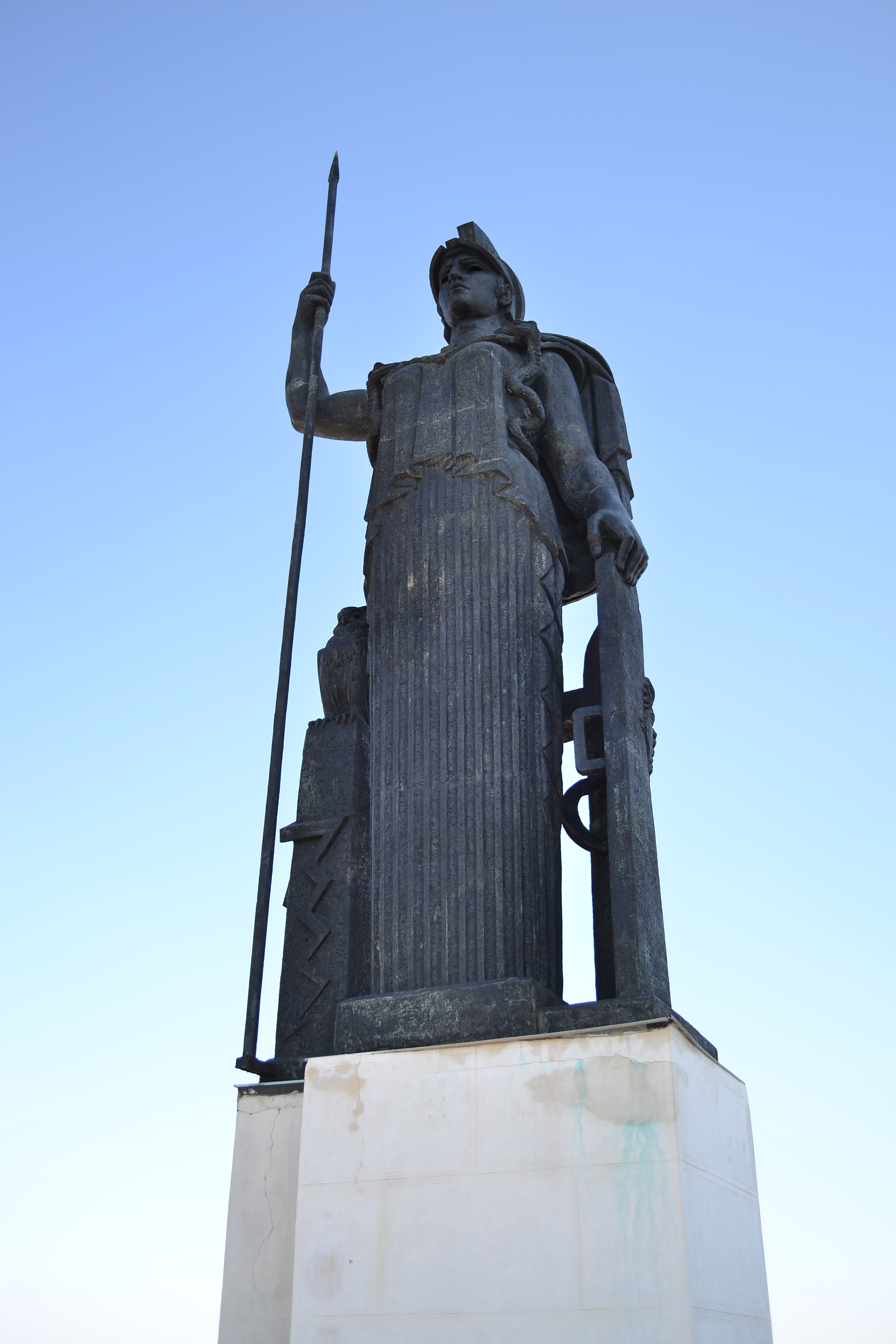
- Artist: Juan Luis Vassallo
- Completion date: 24 January 1966
- Medium: Bronze
- Dimensions: 7.50 m (295 in)
- Weight: 3,000 kg
- Location: Círculo de Bellas Artes, Madrid, Spain

Minerva is a bronze statue in Madrid, Spain, installed on the rooftop of the Círculo de Bellas Artes. It is a representation of Minerva, the Roman goddess of wisdom, arts and strategic warfare.

== History and description ==
In 1964, the project for the statue—intending to fulfill the vision of the original architect Antonio Palacios for the top of the building—was awarded by the Círculo de Bellas Artes to Juan Luis Vassallo.

The sculptural ensemble, representing a standing figure of the goddess, features characteristic attributes associated to Pallas Athena, such as the helmet, shield, spear and owl. Cast in bronze in Arganda del Rey by Eduardo Capa, a disciple of Vassallo, it weighs 3 tonnes.

Following a complicated effort to transport the extremely heavy statue up to the rooftop (involving the installation of a 8-metre high and 1-tonne iron girder in order to secure the structure of the building) codenamed "Operation Minerva", the statue was finally put on its pedestal on 24 January 1966. It stands at about 58 metres above street level, dominating over the intersection between the calle de Alcalá and the Gran Vía.
