= Metropolitano Histórico de Madrid =

Sociedad Metropolitano Histórico de Madrid (MHM) (Historical Metropolitan Society of Madrid in English) is a cultural association from Madrid (Spain) focused in defending and promoting the history and cultural heritage of the Madrid city urban railways, mainly the subway (Metro de Madrid) and historical trams and light trains.

This society is the successor of the former "Sociedad de Amigos del Metro y los Tranvías Históricos de Madrid" (SAMETRAHM) (Society of friends of historical Metro and trams of Madrid in English), which was reconstituted as MHM in 2016 with the same goals and activities.

MHM carries out numerous activities and initiatives of cultural nature. Of particular note is the project developed on the original hall of the Pacífico metro station (designed by the renowned Spanish architect Antonio Palacios), which was approved by the Madrid City Hall district office of Retiro district on October 11, 2016.

This association has also played a prominent role in the struggle and defense of the preservation of the historical Cuatro Caminos subway yard and workshop, where the association also defends the creation of the future Madrid Metro Museum.
