= Statue of Minerva =

The statue of Minerva may refer to:

- Statue of Minerva, Guadalajara, Jalisco, Mexico
- Statue of Minerva (Madrid), Spain
