= Medal of Merit in Labour =

Spanish civil decoration

Medal of Merit in Labour Medalla al Mérito en el Trabajo
- Gold Medal of Merit in Labour

Awarded by Council of Ministers (Gold) and the Ministry of Labour (Silver and Bronze)
- Type: Civil Medal
- Established: 1926 (1982: current rules)
- Country: Spain
- Ribbon
- Grades: Gold, Silver and Bronze

Precedence
- Next (higher): Medalla al Mérito de la Seguridad Vial
- Next (lower): Medalla Plus Ultra

The Medal of Merit in Labour (Spanish: Medalla al Mérito en el Trabajo) is a civil medal awarded in Spain by the Council of Ministers in its gold category and by the Ministry of Labour in its silver and bronze categories to individuals or institutions excelling in a useful and exemplary conduct in the performance of any job, profession, or service usually exercised; or in compensation for damages and suffering suffered in the fulfillment of that professional duty.

== Categories ==
- Gold Medal: Awarded by the Council of Ministers, equivalent to a Grand Cross, its laureates receive the honorific address of Excelentísimo Señor (male) or Excelentísima Señora (female).
- Silver Medal: Awarded by the Ministry of Labour, equivalent to a Commander, its laureates receive the honorific address of Ilustrísimo Señor (male) or Ilustrísima Señora (female).
- Bronze Medal: Awarded by the Ministry of Labour, equivalent to a Knight/Dame, its laureates do not receive any honorific address.

== See also ==
- Eugenio Fernández Quintanilla
