= Círculo de Bellas Artes =

- Círculo de Bellas Artes (Spanish)
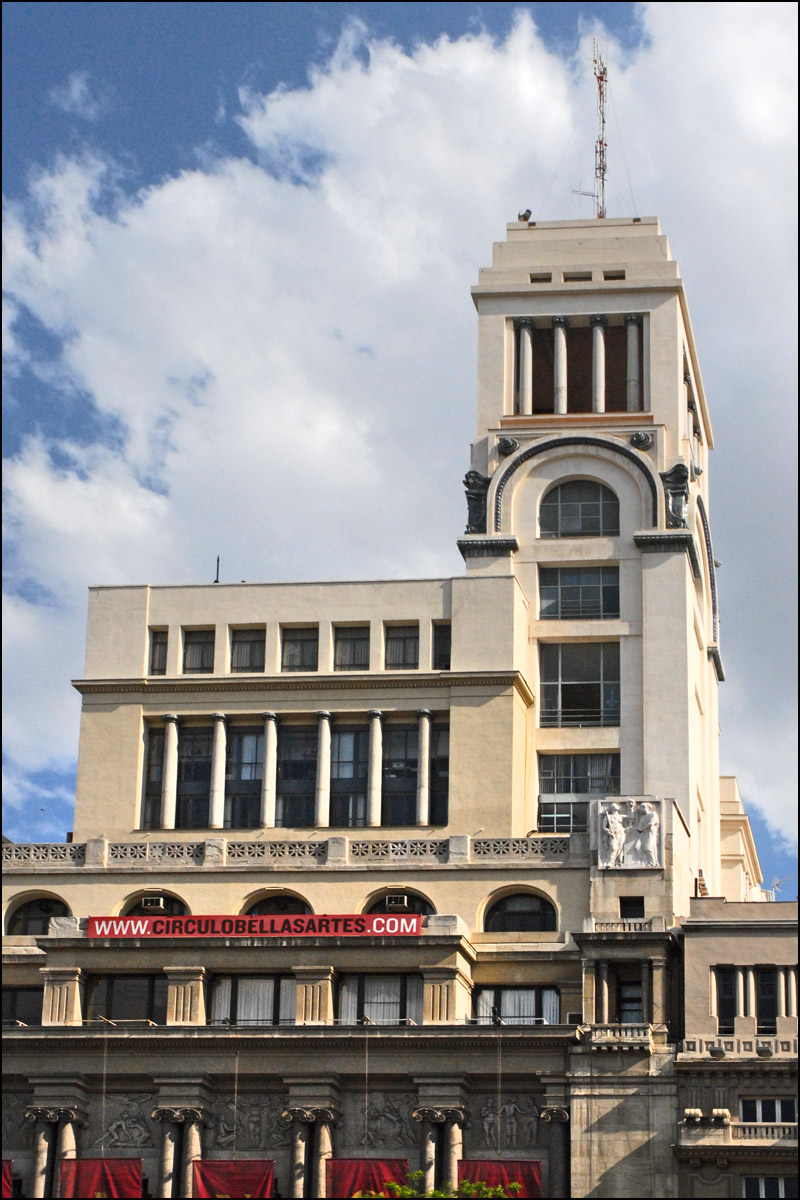

- Location within Spain
- 40.418307°N 3.696575°W
- Location: Madrid, Spain

Spanish Cultural Heritage
- Official name: Círculo de Bellas Artes
- Type: Non-movable
- Criteria: Monument
- Designated: 1981
- Reference no.: RI-51-0004477

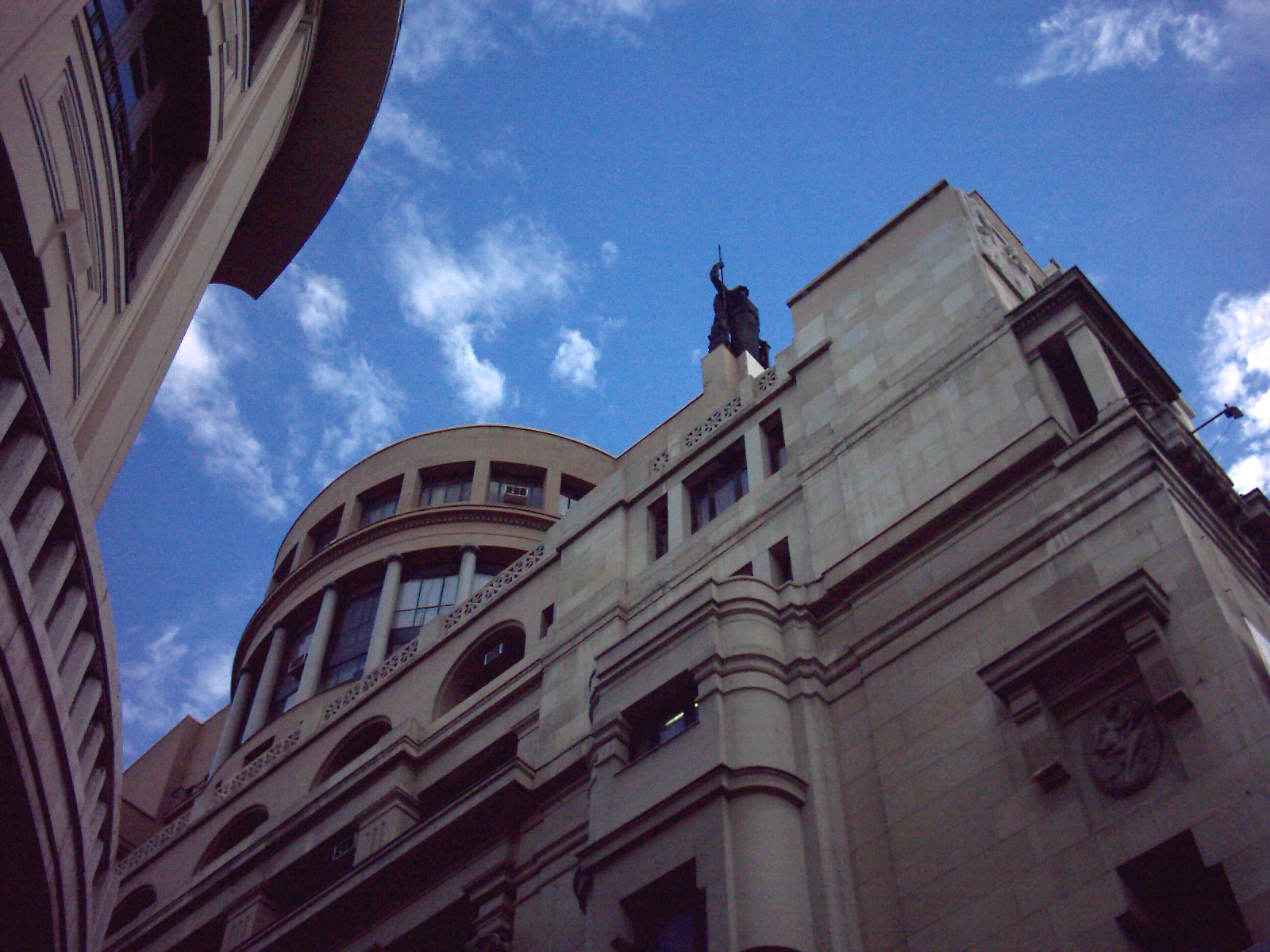
CBA building

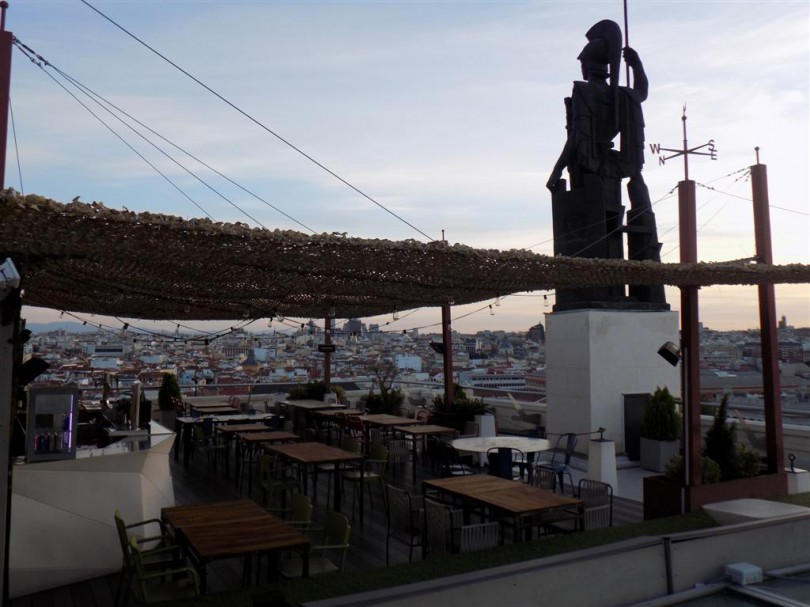
Rooftop terrace

The Círculo de Bellas Artes is a private, non-profit, cultural organization that was founded in 1880. Its building, located in Madrid, Spain, was declared Bien de Interés Cultural in 1981.

The CBA is a major multidisciplinary centre with one of the most active cultural programmes in Madrid. It has exhibition rooms, a cinema, a theatre, concert halls, lecture halls, artists’ workshops, a library, a cafeteria, a shop and many other facilities. Every day it puts on activities to do with the visual arts, music, film, the stage, literature, science, philosophy and poetry.

The building which houses the Círculo de Bellas Artes was designed by the architect Antonio Palacios and constructed in 1926.

== Exhibitions ==
Four exhibition rooms with a programme in which both figures and artists are represented every year: Le Corbusier, Picasso, Jean Arp, Silvia Plachy, Johann Wolfgang von Goethe, Pier Paolo Passolini, Henri Michaux, Hans Hartung, Bruno Schulz, Pierre Klossowski, Nacho Criado, Basilio Martín Patino, Zaj, Jean Dubuffet, Mário Cesariny, Brassaï...

== Humanities ==
A meeting point for thought, the sciences, literature, philosophy and the arts. The conferences, talks, discussions and poetry recitals that are organised on a daily basis have involved leading figures from the world of culture such as Günter Grass, Seamus Heaney, Jürgen Habermas, Rafael Alberti, George Steiner, Slavoj Žižek, Claudio Magris, Antonio Gamoneda, Hans Magnus Enzensberger, Cees Nooteboom, Manoel de Oliveira, Jean Baudrillard, Umberto Eco, Juan Gelman, John Berger, Ernesto Sábato, Álvaro Siza, Carlos Fuentes and Edward Said.

== Shows ==
The Círculo de Bellas Artes programmes a wide variety of music, encompassing both classical and contemporary highbrow music, and the more innovative styles of popular music. Those who have performed here include Pierre Boulez, Luis de Pablo, Lila Downs, Tiken Jah Fakoly, Marianne Faithfull, Vinicio Capossela, Jane Birkin, María Joao and Chano Lobato.

== Films ==
The CBA has a film theatre which every day shows original-language films that are not normally seen in commercial cinemas. Its retrospectives and dedicated cycles are a must for film-lovers in Madrid.

== Workshops ==
In addition to the drawing, painting and etching open workshops, for many decades artists and intellectuals have taught at the Círculo de Bellas Artes, including Pablo Palazuelo, Antonio Saura, Eduardo Arroyo, Juan Navarro Baldeweg, Antoni Muntadas, Nancy Spero, Julian Schnabel, Esther Ferrer, Juan Muñoz, Juan Genovés, Alberto García-Alix, Agustín Ibarrola, Ramón Masats, Chema Madoz, Donald Kuspit, Georges Didi-Huberman, Iñaki Ábalos, Nacho Criado and Dominique Perrault.

== Radio ==
Radio Círculo is a radio station broadcasting via the Internet whose programmes are dedicated entirely to the world of culture.

== Publications ==
The cultural activity is collected and disseminated in a wide-ranging catalogue of publications that include essay, art and poetry collections, as well as the Minerva magazine, one of the most important cultural publications in Spanish. The Círculo de Bellas Artes regularly produces music CDs and documentary films on artistic subjects.

== Gold Medals ==
Since 1991, the CBA has awarded with its Gold Medal the work of creators such as Fernando Arrabal, Francisco Umbral, Carmen Martín Gaite, Günter Grass, Álvaro Siza, Alicia Alonso, Antonio Saura, Carlos Fuentes, Antoni Tàpies, Jean Baudrillard, Massimo Cacciari, Elías Querejeta, Ana María Matute, Manoel de Oliveira, Agustín Ibarrola y Luis de Pablo, John Berger, Antonio Gamoneda, Carles Santos, Michael Haneke, Raimon, Fredric Jameson, Jordi Savall, Salman Rushdie, Gonzalo Suárez, Georges Didi-Huberman, Aki Kaurismäki, Slavoj Žižek, Teresa Berganza, Javier Solana, Gianni Vattimo.

== Rental spaces ==
The CBA is a reference space and a guarantee for many companies that organise events, as it provides them with the ideal setting for putting their ideas into practice. The CBA building has 15,000 square metres of floor space including four exhibition halls, a floor of workshops, six multi-purpose rooms, a library, and a billiards and games room, a theatre, two historical rooms –the Salón de Baile (Ballroom) and the Sala de Columnas (Hall of Columns)-, a cinema, a radio station, a bookshop and a big café-restaurant popularly known as La Pecera, or the goldfish bowl.

== See also ==
- Statue of Minerva (Madrid)
- Eugenio Fernández Quintanilla
