= Eugenio Fernández Quintanilla =

Spanish architect (1887–1932)

The Most Excellent Eugenio Fernández Quintanilla
- Born: 1887; Arnuero, Spain
- Died: 30 May 1932 (aged 44–45); Madrid, Spain
- Education: Madrid School of Architecture
- Occupation: Architect
- Notable work: Santander Central Post Office Building (Santander)
- Parent(s): Joaquín Fernández; Elvira Quintanilla
- Awards: Medal of Merit in Labour

Eugenio Fernández Quintanilla (Arnuero, Cantabria, 1887 – Madrid, 30 May 1932) was a Spanish architect who worked mainly in Santander and Madrid. He was also the architect for the Madrid Municipal Fire Department, head of the Urban Planning Section of the Madrid City Council, and president of the Association of Architects of Spain. In 1932, he was awarded the Medal of Merit in Labour.

Like most Cantabrian architects of his time, he was a follower of the regionalist architecture developed by Leonardo Rucabado, as seen in his major architectural work, the Santander Post Office Building. This work was conceived together with Secundino Zuazo; however, it was Fernández Quintanilla who oversaw its construction. With Zuazo, he collaborated on the controversial competition for the construction of the Círculo de Bellas Artes headquarters; their project was one of the highest-rated, though it was ultimately not selected. They also jointly designed several buildings on the newly created Gran Vía in Madrid.

== Biography ==
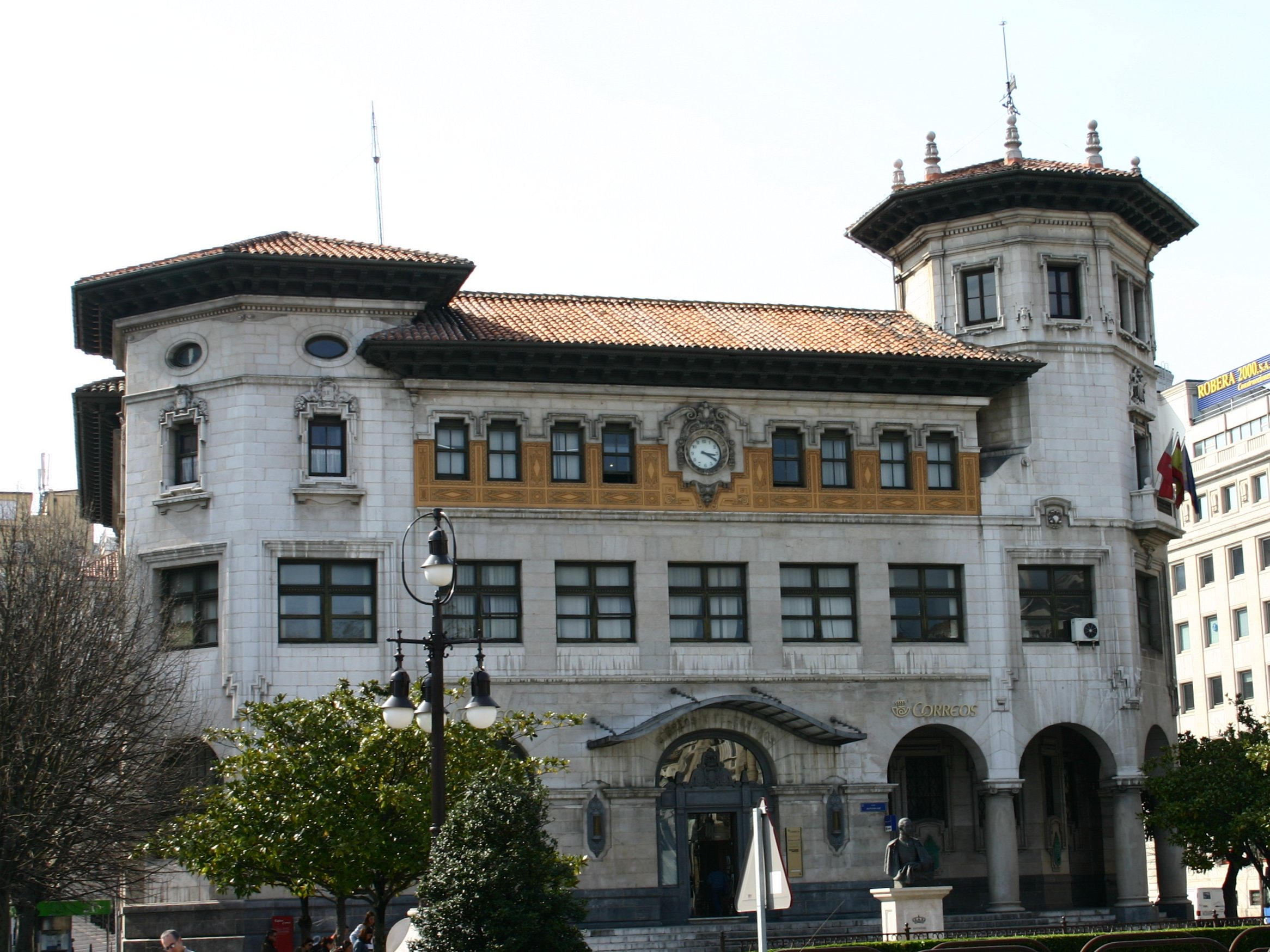
Santander Central Post Office Building, work by Fernández Quintanilla and Secundino Zuazo.

Eugenio Fernández Quintanilla was born in the Cantabrian municipality of Arnuero; son of Joaquín Fernández de Peña and Elvira Quintanilla Cagigal, he was a cousin of the painter Luis Quintanilla. In 1913 he graduated from the Madrid School of Architecture and a year later became the architect for the Madrid Municipal Fire Department. He was also president of the Association of Architects of Spain.

He is classified within the Montaña Regionalist School alongside other Cantabrian architects of the period, such as Javier González de Riancho, Deogracias Mariano Lastra, Ramón Lavín Casalis, Valentín Lavín del Noval, Gonzalo Bringas, among others; this school followed the precepts of the architect from Castro, Leonardo Rucabado, as set out in his book Proyecto de palacio para una noble de la Montaña, which proposed using elements characteristic of the architecture found in the Cantabria region during the 17th and 18th centuries to create an identifiable architecture. Fernández Quintanilla transformed Rucabado's ideas towards architectural rationalism, as can be seen in his work on the Coliseum Cinema (Santander, 1929).

In 1915, he won first prize in the competition for the Santander Post Office Building, designing the project together with Secundino Zuazo, although Fernández Quintanilla was in charge of the construction.This work shows Rucabado's influence, presenting a style typical of Montaña regionalism with a tendency towards ornamental architecture. Inaugurated in September 1927, it is a free-standing, rectangular-plan building with ashlar walls and a wooden frame. The rear has a closed, continuous balcony, while its main façade is flanked by two polygonal towers. In 1919, he also collaborated with Zuazo on the competition for the Post Office building in Bilbao.

In mid-March 1919, the council of the Círculo de Bellas Artes called a national competition to build the social headquarters of the cultural institution. The first prize included direction of the works, and five others received compensation of between three and fifteen thousand pesetas. A total of fifteen submissions were entered. Fernández Quintanilla entered together with Zuazo, proposing a union between traditional Spanish architecture and the classicism with new forms seen in European cities, showing influence from Peter Behrens and Paul Bonatz. After discarding several preliminary projects in the first sessions due to quality or non-compliance with the competition rules, the project by Fernández Quintanilla and Secundino Zuazo won first prize in the fourth session and a cash award of 7,500 pesetas. However, this decision caused anger from Antonio Palacios and two hundred other architects, who called for debates in assemblies and led to numerous resignations within the institution. The final stage of the competition was declared void as none of the three finalists achieved an absolute majority; their project came second with two of the six votes. Finally, the board of the Círculo de Bellas Artes approved Antonio Palacios's project after he offered to direct the project in exchange for waiving his fees. This led to complaints among architects and further resignations within the institution, as well as inflating the initial budget (four million) by almost two million pesetas.

In 1929, he collaborated with the politician and architect Bernardo Giner de los Ríos on the drafting of Madrid: información sobre la ciudad, a research work presented at the First Congress of Urban Planning in Spain. That same year, he also organized, with Giner de los Ríos, the Office of Information on the City of Madrid.

Alongside other national architects, Fernández Quintanilla is one of the creators of the Gran Vía in Madrid, collaborating with Secundino Zuazo along with Fernando de Escondrillas and José Miguel de la Quadra-Salcedo. In 1929, he was chosen as a juror for the awards given by the Spanish government as part of the International Competition for the Columbus Lighthouse, receiving the third highest number of votes. This competition involved over two thousand architects from forty-eight countries, who submitted a total of 456 preliminary projects for this tribute to Christopher Columbus in Santo Domingo.

He died on 30 May 1932 in Madrid, the same year he was awarded the Medal of Merit in Labour and appointed head of the Urban Planning Section of the Madrid City Council.

== Style ==
At the beginning of his career, he followed the regionalist precepts of Leonardo Rucabado, a trend spread among Cantabrian architects of the time in search of a distinctive identifying feature; however, he transformed these ideas towards architectural rationalism, which sought to balance traditional architecture, preserving the typical style, with modernity, accepting industrial processes, technological progress, and invention, which prevailed in major European cities. Towards the end of his work, simplicity and the elimination of all superfluous elements within eclecticism and with Art Deco influence are apparent, as seen in the Coliseum Cinema.

== Works ==
Eugenio Fernández Quintanilla designed the following works:

- House for Dr. Azúa (Madrid, 1914)
- House for Benjamín del Río (Santander, 1917)
- Santander Post Office Building (Santander, 1918–1925)
- Rental houses at General Espartero Street, numbers 9, 11 and 13 (Santander, 1920–1923)
- Family house for Manuel Suárez Inclán (Santander, 1920)
- Family house for Laureano Falla Gutiérrez (Santander, 1920)
- Family house for Eduardo Pérez del Molino (Santander, 1922)
- Peña y Media House (Santander, 1923)
- Pantheon for the Peiró family (Madrid, 1923)
- Peña y Media House (Madrid, 1924)
- School of the Piarists (Santander, 1927)
- House for Francisco Hueso (Madrid, 1928)
- House for Leopoldo García (Madrid, 1929)
- Coliseum Cinema (Santander, 1929)
- Main house of the Valdenoja estate (Santander, 1931)

== Bibliography ==
- Aramburu-Zabala Higuera, Miguel Ángel (2008). Álbum fotográfico [Photographic Album] (in Spanish). Santander: PubliCan. ISBN 978-84-8102-485-2.
- Fernández-Quintanilla, Joaquín (2008). La saga de los Quintanilla [The Quintanilla Saga] (in Spanish). Santander: PubliCan. ISBN 978-84-8102-483-8.
- Moure Romanillo, Alfonso; Suárez Cortina, Manuel (2002). De la montaña a Cantabria: la construcción de una comunidad autónoma [From the Mountain to Cantabria: The Construction of an Autonomous Community] (in Spanish). Santander: University of Cantabria. ISBN 84-8102-112-1.
- Jiménez-Landi Martínez, Antonio (1996). La Institución Libre de Enseñanza y su ambiente [The Institución Libre de Enseñanza and its Environment] (in Spanish). Vol. IV. Período de expansión influyente. Madrid: Complutense University. ISBN 84-89365-99-7.
- Navascués Palacio, Pedro; Alonso Pereira, José Ramón (2002). La Gran Vía de Madrid: Noventa años de la historia de Madrid [The Gran Vía of Madrid: Ninety Years of Madrid's History] (in Spanish). Madrid: Encuentro. ISBN 84-7490-667-9.
- Suazo Ugalde, Secundino (2003). Madrid y sus anhelos urbanísticos (Memorias, 1919-1940) [Madrid and its Urbanistic Longings (Memoirs, 1919-1940)] (in Spanish). Madrid: Nerea. ISBN 84-89569-87-8.
