= Juan Luis Vassallo =

Juan Luis Vassallo (Cádiz; 2 May 1908-Madrid; 18 April 1986) was a Spanish sculptor, noted for his religious work.

== Biography ==
He was the son of the Chiclana painter Eduardo Vassallo Dorronzoro and Dolores Parodi Rosas, Cadiz families of Italian origin. He began his studies in Cordoba, where his father was stationed, and continued them in Baeza, where he met the sculptor Mateo Inurria. At the age of 19 he left to study in Madrid, having won a scholarship to attend life drawing classes at the Círculo de Bellas Artes. He also attended the School of Arts and Crafts. His teachers were Aniceto Marinas and José Capuz. In 1927 he won the first prize for sculpture at the Casino's annual exhibition with his portrait of La Jeroma. The sculptor Mariano Benlliure, a member of the jury, paid for the bronze reproduction. He studied at the San Fernando School of Fine Arts between 1931 and 1934. After that he moved to Ávila, where he became a teacher at the School of Arts and Crafts. His two years in Ávila introduced him to Castilian realist sculpture and stonework, as can be seen in his Mujer abulense and Añoranza, for which he won the third medal at the 1934 National Fine Arts Exhibition.

From 1936 he began his Andalusian period at the School of Arts and Crafts in Jerez de la Frontera (1936-1941) and at the School of Fine Arts in Seville from 1943; he directed the latter centre from 1952 to 1958. In 1943 he created the sculpture of Jesus praying in the Garden for the brotherhood of the same name in Jerez.

In 1958 he obtained the chair of Modelling at the San Fernando School of Fine Arts in Madrid, where he moved and where he continued to teach until his retirement in 1978.

In 1967, he was appointed a full member of the San Fernando Fine Arts Academy. In 1972 he was awarded first prize in the competition for the design of a monument to Saint Teresa in Ávila, a monument that was built on the occasion of Pope John Paul II's visit in 1982.

His grandson, Francisco Javier Latasa, used part of the sculptor's name and the spelling of his signature in the creation and naming of the company VASS.

== Sculptures ==
Head of an Old Woman (La Jeroma), 1927; Longing, 1934; Woman of Avila, 1934; Girl of the Stone, 1938; Sorrowful Virgin of the Brotherhood of Nuestro Padre Jesús Nazareno de Cádiz, 1943; Restoration of the Galeona, 1944; Immaculate Conception of the Seminary of San Isidoro in Seville, 1945; Bust of a Young Gypsy, 1945; Gades, 1948; Maternity, 1948; Praying Statue of Doña Beatriz de Suabia in the royal chapel of Seville Cathedral, 1948; Bust of Rafael "el Gallo", 1950; Monument to the Assumption in Jerez de la Frontera, 1952; Lavandera, 1957; Head of the painter Gustavo Bacarisas, 1958; Portrait of Juan Belmonte, 1961; Christ of Calvary in the Church of the Holy Cross in Baeza (Jaén), 1962; Monument to the Quintero Brothers in Utrera (Seville), 1962; Christ of Peace, 1963; Córdoba, 1966; Statue of Minerva, 1964; Marble and Form, 1968; Pudor, 1969; Fishermen of the Tiberias, 1972; Bather Tanning, 1974; Bust of King Juan Carlos I, 1976; Bather Resting, 1977; Monument to Saint Teresa of Jesus in the Plaza del Mercado Grande in Avila, 1982.

== Bibliography ==
- López Anglada, L. "Juan Luis Vassallo y sus ídolos de barro", La Estafeta Literaria, 456, 15 Nov. 1970.
- LORITE CRUZ, Pablo Jesús. "La imagen del crucificado en tres grandes imagineros del siglo XX: Francisco Palma Burgos, Juan Luis Vassallo Parodi y Amadeo Ruiz Olmos." XVIII Symposium of the Escurialense Institute of Historical and Artistic Research. "Los crucificados: religiosidad, cofradías y arte. "San Lorenzo de El Escorial, 2010. "La imagen del crucificado en tres grandes imagineros del siglo XX: Francisco Palma Burgos, Juan Luis Vassallo Parodi y Amadeo Ruiz Olmos" (The image of the crucified in three great 20th century image makers: Francisco Palma Burgos, Juan Luis Vassallo Parodi and Amadeo Ruiz Olmos). Communication No. 47. Pp. 853-868.
- Juan Luis Vassallo, Madrid, Gadesarte, 1992.
- La materia en la obra de Juan Luis Vassallo: Castillo de Santa Bárbara, Alicante from 9 February to 5 April 2001, Alicante, Fundación Eduardo Capa, 2001.
- Merino Calvo, J. A. Tradición y contemporaneidad: el escultor Juan Luis Vassallo Parodi, Cátedra "Adolfo de Castro", Fundación Municipal de Cultura, Cádiz, 1987.
- Merino Calvo, J. A., Juan Luis Vassallo. Permanent exhibition Reina Sofía Cultural Centre. Cádiz City Council, Cádiz, 2006.
- VV. AA., Forma y materia: la escultura de Juan Luis Vasallo: exposición Palacio de Congresos y Exposiciones de Cádiz, Fundación Municipal de Cultura, 2002.
