= Ramón Masats =

Spanish photographer and filmmaker (1931–2024)

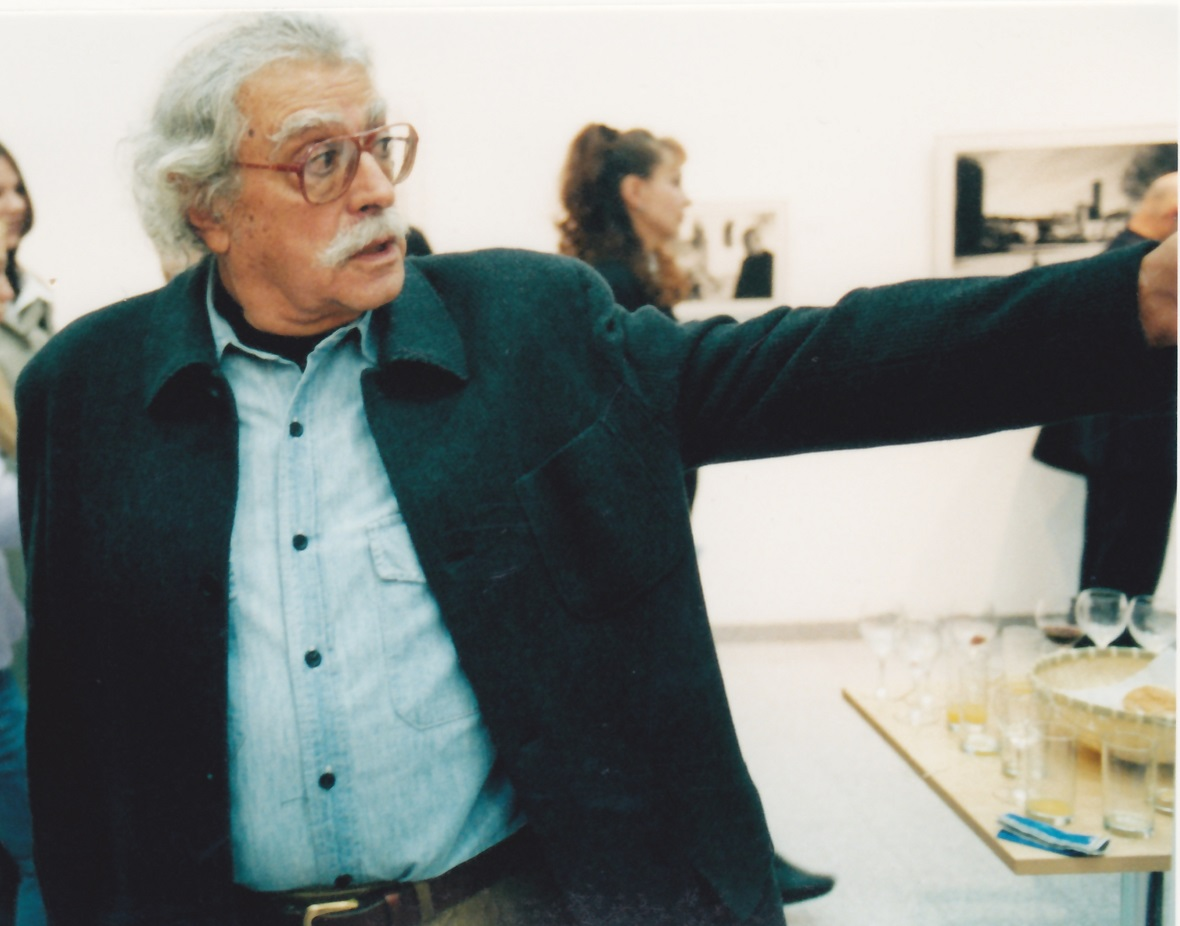
- Masats in 2013
- Born: Ramón Masats Tartera; 17 March 1931; Caldes de Montbui, Spain
- Died: 4 March 2024 (aged 92); Madrid, Spain
- Occupations: Photographer; Filmmaker

Ramón Masats Tatera (17 March 1931 – 4 March 2024) was a Spanish photographer and filmmaker.

== Biography ==
Born in Caldes de Montbui on 16 March 1931, Masats first became a photojournalist in 1953 and worked at La Rambla in Barcelona. The following year, he joined the Real Sociedad Fotográfica. In 1957, he joined the Agrupació Fotogràfica de Catalunya. That year, he moved to Madrid and joined the Gaceta Ilustrada, the Grupo fotográfico AFAL, and Arriba. In 1964, he released his documentary on the Museo del Prado, which won him an award at the Taormina Film Fest.

Ramón Masats died in Madrid on 4 March 2024, at the age of 92.

== Awards ==
- National Photography Award (2004)
