= Hospital of Maudes =

- Hospital de Maudes
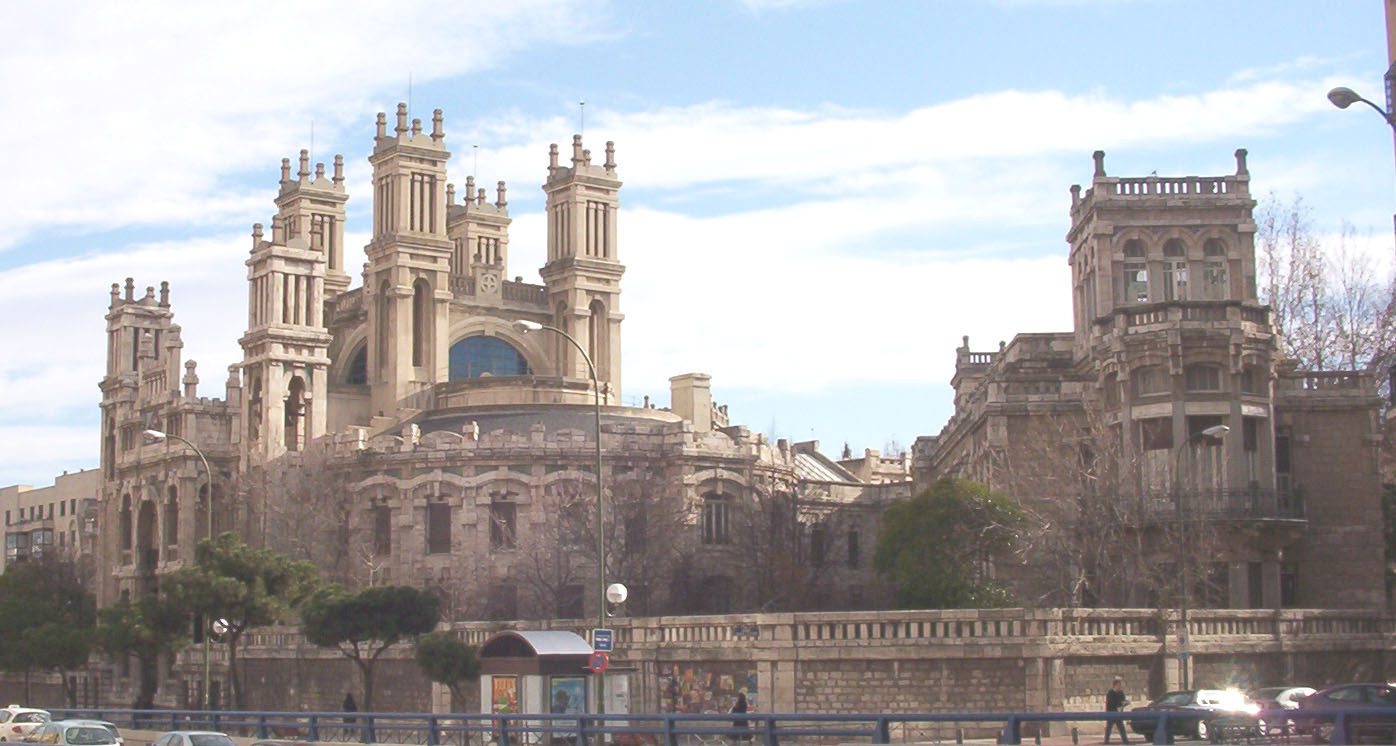

General information
- Location: Ríos Rosas, Madrid, Spain
- Address: Calle de Raimundo Fernández Villaverde, 18
- Coordinates: 40.445936°N 3.701125°W
- Inaugurated: 23 June 1916

Design and construction
- Architect(s): Antonio Palacios, Joaquín Otamendi

Spanish Cultural Heritage
- Official name: Hospital de Jornaleros
- Type: Non-movable
- Criteria: Monument
- Designated: 1979
- Reference no.: RI-51-0004374

The Hospital of Maudes (Spanish: Hospital de Maudes) is a former hospital located in Madrid, Spain. It is a complex of buildings including a church. The buildings are linked apart from accommodation for infectious diseases.

== Architecture ==
The building is faced in white limestone. The eclectic architecture presents some similarities to the Cybele Palace, which was designed by the same partnership. For example, both buildings present a skyline dominated by towers. In the case of the Hospital de Maudes, the towers of the church are particularly prominent, but there are towers elsewhere in the complex.

The church has an entrance directly onto the street, but otherwise the complex is surrounded by a wall. There are some garden areas which were intended to aid the recuperation of patients. The design of the courtyards is possibly influenced by the Hostal dos Reis Católicos, a building with which Palacios, who was born in Galicia, would have been familiar.

== History ==
Maudes was the name of the locality in which the hospital is situated. It was also known as the hospital of the jornaleros, day labourers, being intended for the use of the poorer classes of Madrid. It was inaugurated on 23 June 1916.

After the Civil War it became a military hospital. It fell into disuse in 1970. The property, apart from the church, was subsequently acquired by the Community of Madrid.

== Conservation ==
It was declared Monumento Histórico Artístico (Note: The current heritage listing is Bien de Interés Cultural which came into force in the 1980s.) on 6 July 1979. It has been renovated by the Community of Madrid.

The centenary of the building was celebrated in 2016 with guided visits and concerts.
