= Antonio Palacios =

Spanish architect (1874–1945)

Antonio Palacios Ramilo
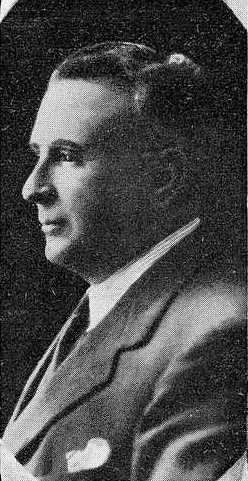
- Born: 8 January 1874; O Porriño, Spain
- Died: 27 October 1945 (aged 73); El Plantío, Spain

Antonio Palacios Ramilo (8 January 1874 – 27 October 1945) was a Spanish architect. Distinguished by the monumental eclecticism he left as imprint in many of his projects, he helped define the architectural identity of Madrid in the first half of the 20th century.

== Biography ==
Born on 8 January 1874 in O Porriño, province of Pontevedra. Palacios moved to Madrid to start his studies as Engineer; he switched to Architecture, and obtained a degree in 1903.

A prolific architect, he modernized the image of Madrid with some of the most emblematic buildings of the Spanish capital. He received influence from Secessionist modernismo, but according to Óscar da Rocha Aranda, only as feature within a wider mashup of many eclectic styles, such as Neoplateresque, Neoclassicism and modern US commercial arquitecture.

Palacios, who also designed the interior of some of the original Metro de Madrid stations, was the creator of the iconic rhomboidal logo of the rapid transit.

He became a member of the Real Academia de Bellas Artes de San Fernando in 1926.

He died on 27 October 1945 in El Plantío, Madrid.

== Selected works ==
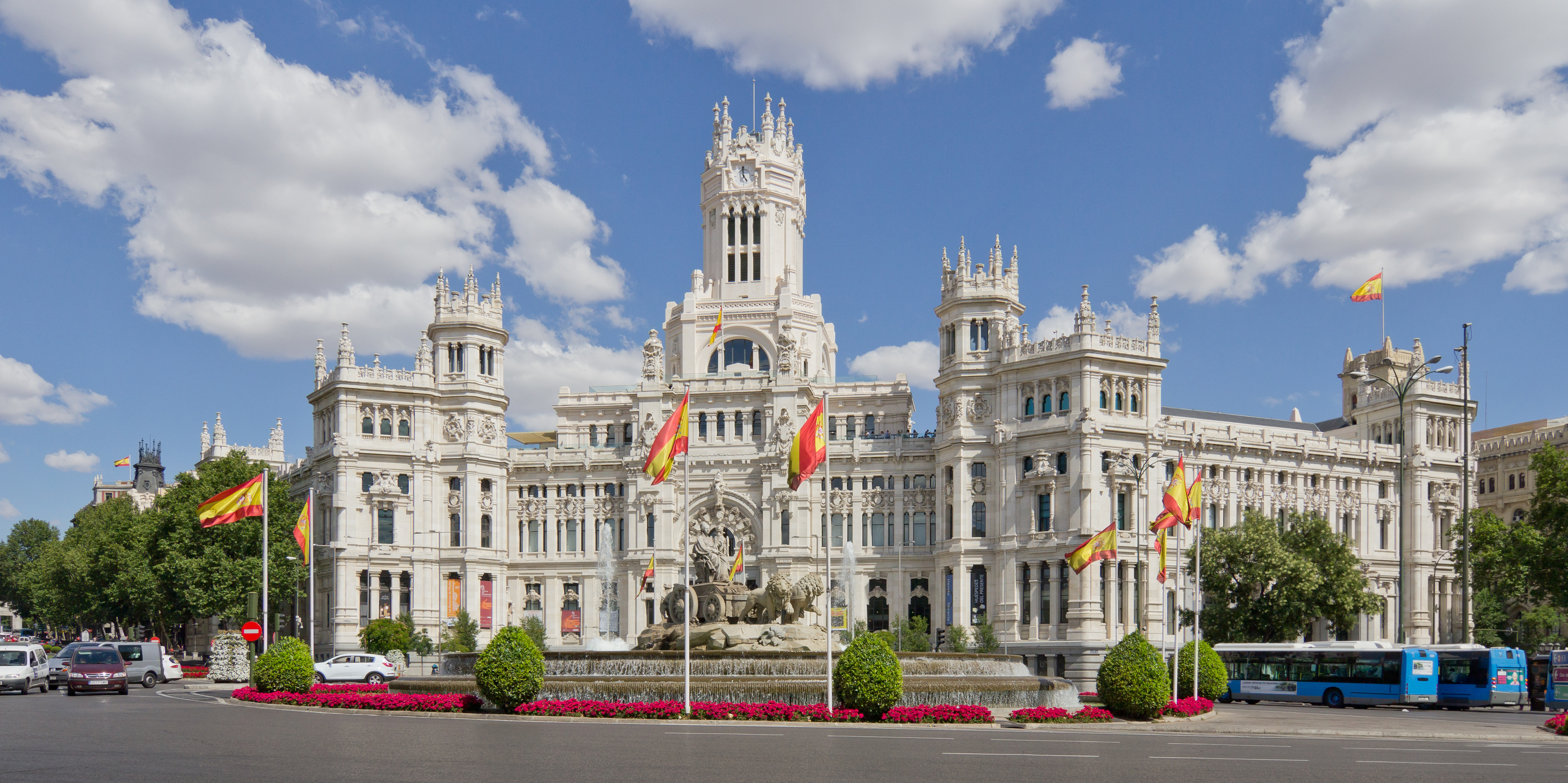
Palacio de Comunicaciones

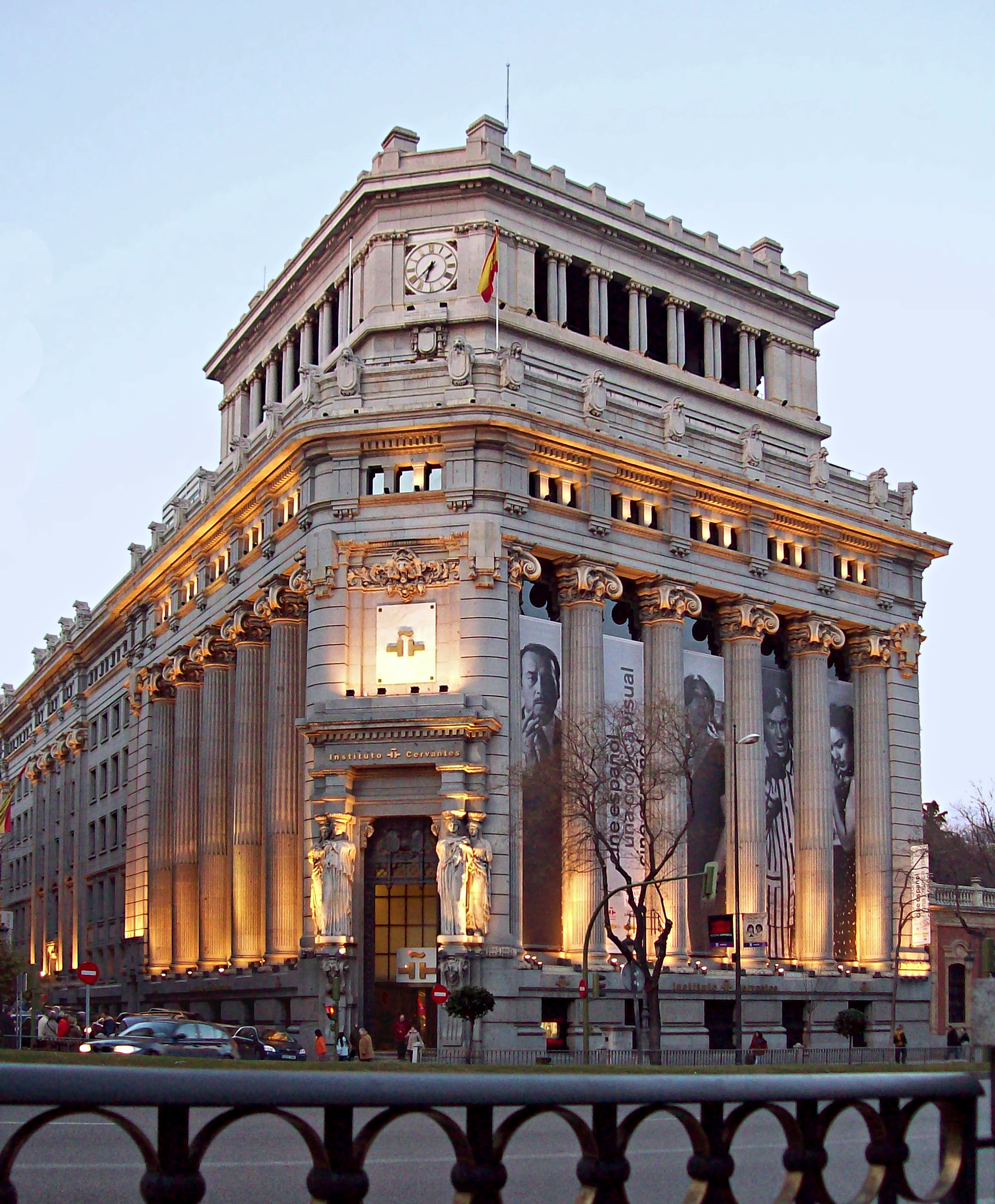
The Río de La Plata Bank

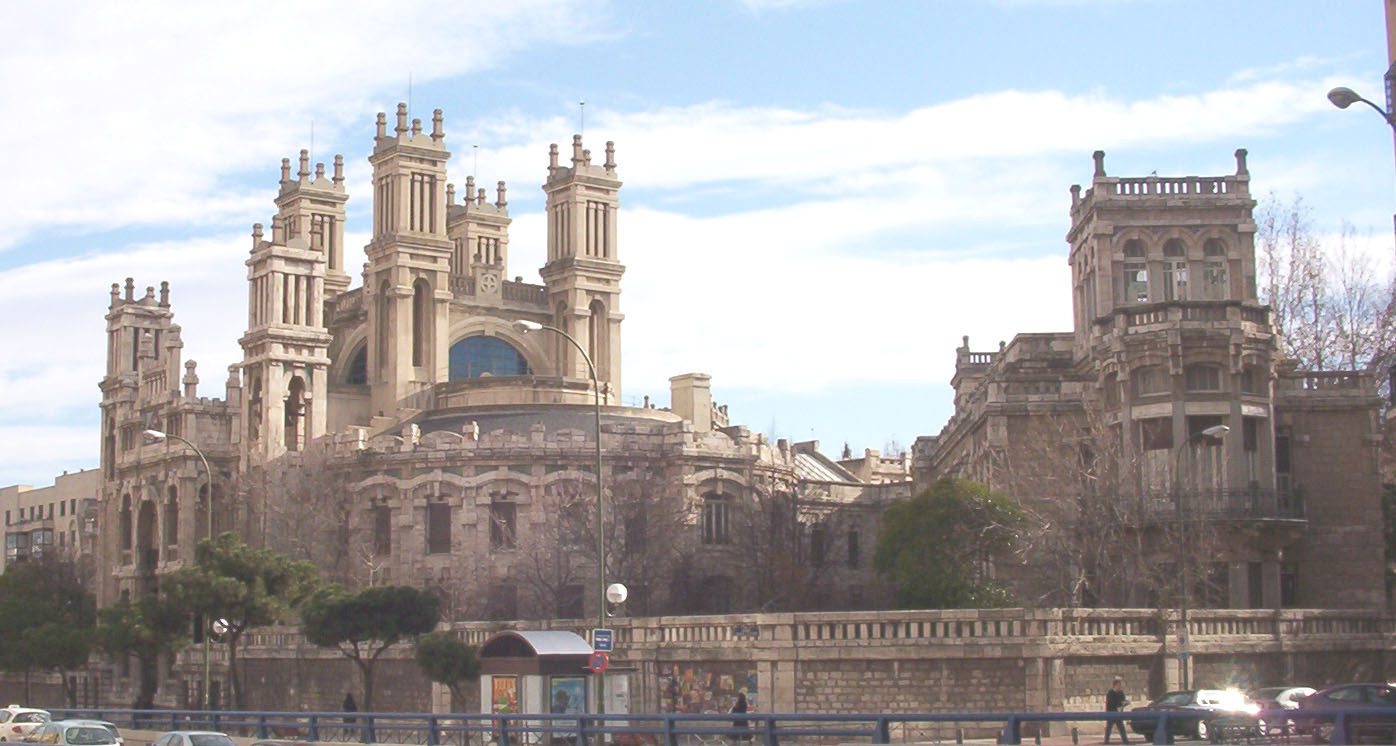
Hospital de Maudes

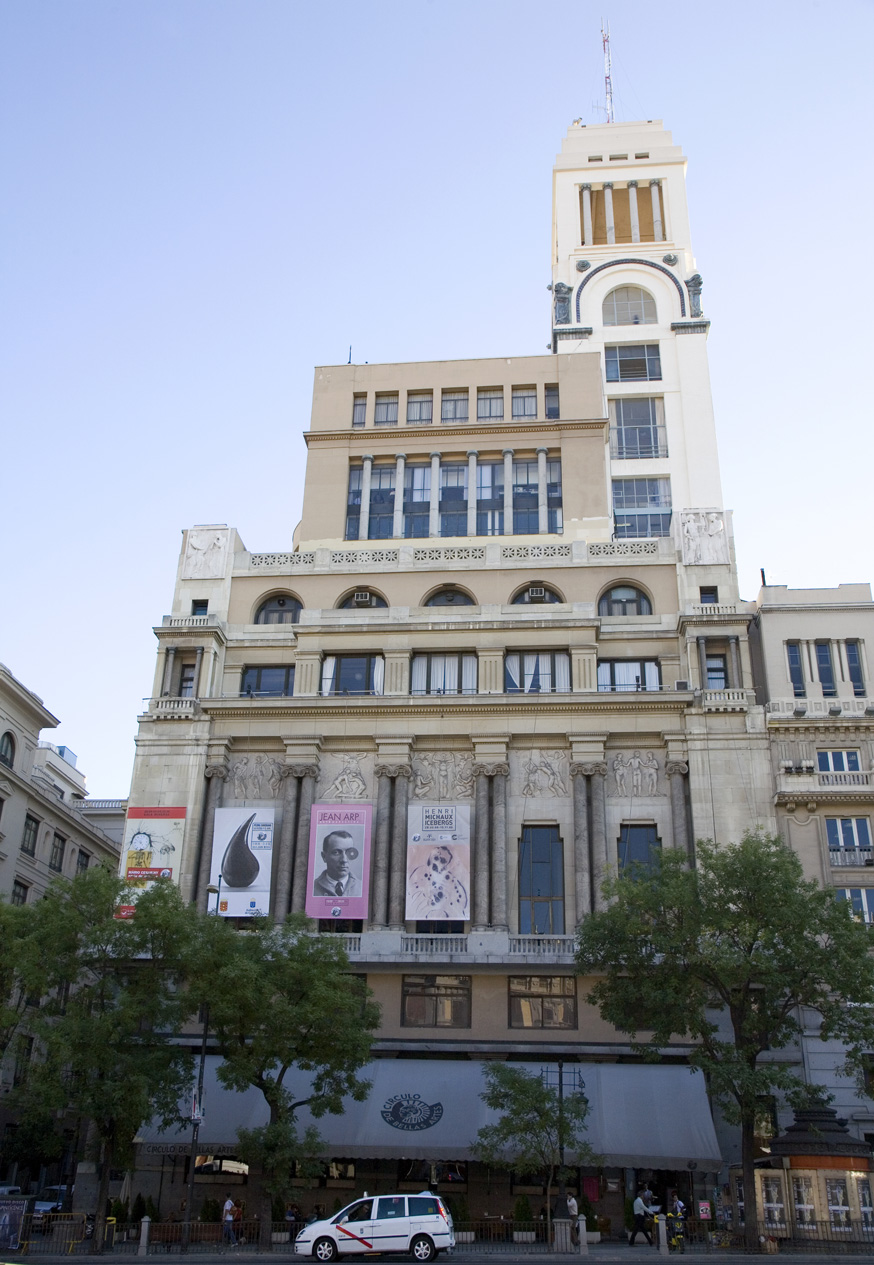
Círculo de Bellas Artes

Madrid

- Palacio de Comunicaciones (1904)
- Banco del Río de la Plata (1910)
- Hospital de Maudes (1908)
- Talleres del ICAI (1908)
- Banco del Comercio y de la Industria (1914)
- Templete del Metro de la Gran Vía (1919; dismantled and moved to Porriño after his death)
- Edificios comerciales de la calle Mayor 4, Gran Vía 27 & 34 (1919 and 1921)
- Círculo de Bellas Artes (1919)
- Hotel Florida (1922; demolished in 1964)
- Casa de Antonio Palacios, in El Plantío, Madrid (1942)
- Banco Mercantil e Industrial (1945)

Galicia

- Teatro Rosalía de Castro, in Vigo (1906)
- Virxe da Roca, in Baiona, Pontevedra (1912)
- Casa do concello do Porriño, in O Porriño (1919)
- Banco de Vigo, in Vigo (1941)
- Templo votivo do Mar, in Panxón, Nigrán (1932)
- Mosteiro da Visitación, in Vigo (1942)
- Igrexa da Vera Cruz, in O Carballiño (1943)

== See also ==
- Eugenio Fernández Quintanilla
