= Monument to Miguel de Cervantes =

Monument in Palacio, Madrid, Spain

- Monumento a Miguel de Cervantes
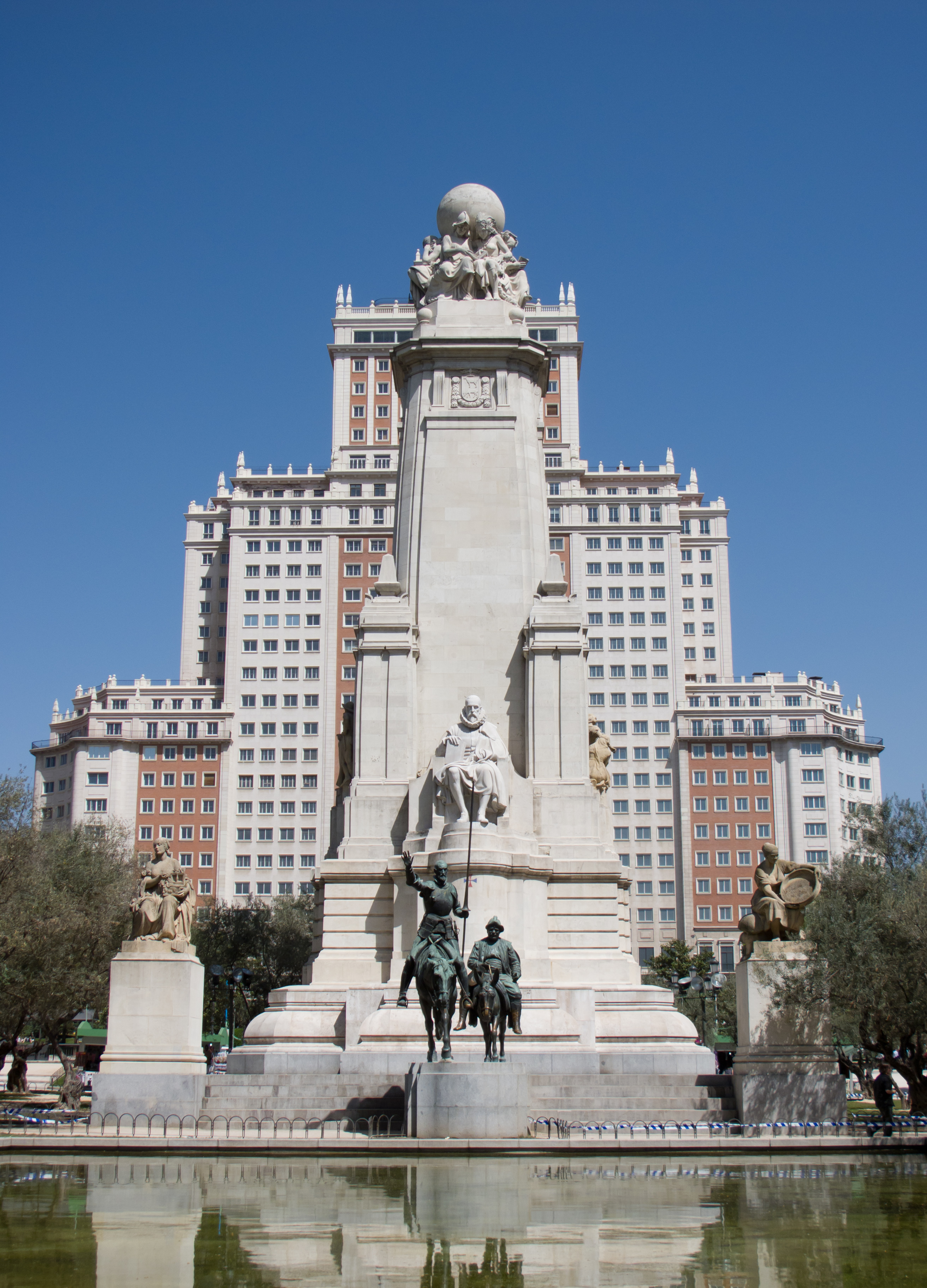
- Interactive map of Monument to Miguel de Cervantes
- Location: Plaza de España, Madrid, Spain
- Coordinates: 40.423201°N 3.712583°W
- Designer: Architectural elements: Rafael Martínez Zapatero and Pedro Muguruza; Statues: Lorenzo Coullaut Valera and Federico Coullaut-Valera Mendigutia
- Height: 34 m
- Opening date: 13 October 1929
- Dedicated to: Miguel de Cervantes

The Monument to Miguel de Cervantes is an instance of public art located in Madrid, Spain. Erected on the centre of the Plaza de España, it is dedicated to Miguel de Cervantes, widely regarded as the greatest writer in the Spanish language. The monument incorporates a stone monolith with several statues (including Cervantes') and a detached bronze sculptural group representing Don Quixote and Sancho Panza.

== History and description ==
In 1915, a year before the 300th anniversary of the writer's death, a public contest was announced in order to award the project. The announcement was met with concern among certain reviewers. The winning project was awarded to a dark horse proposal by Rafael Martínez Zapatero and Lorenzo Coullaut Valera that had been derided as overly literary, detail-oriented and anecdotal. The jury's decision was criticised via an open letter signed by at least 109 public figures, including, to name a few, Ramón del Valle Inclán, Alejandro Ferrant, Emilio Carrere, Daniel Zuloaga, Tomás Borrás and Ramón Gómez de la Serna.

It was funded through a popular subscription across all the Spanish-speaking nations. The building works suffered delays and the project was substantially changed from the original draft. By the time works started, Pedro Muguruza joined as architect assistant. Standing 34 metres high, the central stone monolith was finished in 1929, yet it was still missing several sculptural elements, only featuring the sculptures representing Cervantes, the allegories of Literature, Military Value and Mysticism and the sculptural group comprised by the Earth Globe surrounded by five women representing the five continents topping the monument, aside from the detached bronze statues of Don Quixote and Sancho Panza. Still unfinished, it was inaugurated on 13 October 1929.

Later in time, several statues representing characters from Cervantes' work sculpted by Lorenzo Coullaut's son—Federico Coullaut-Valera Mendigutia—such as Dulcinea del Toboso and Aldonza Lorenzo (in 1957) and Rinconete y Cortadillo and La gitanilla (in 1960) were added to the ensemble.

The monument was declared Bien de Interés Patrimonial ("Good of Patrimonial Interest") by the Community of Madrid in 2018.
