= Palacio de la Prensa =

Historic building in Madrid, Spain

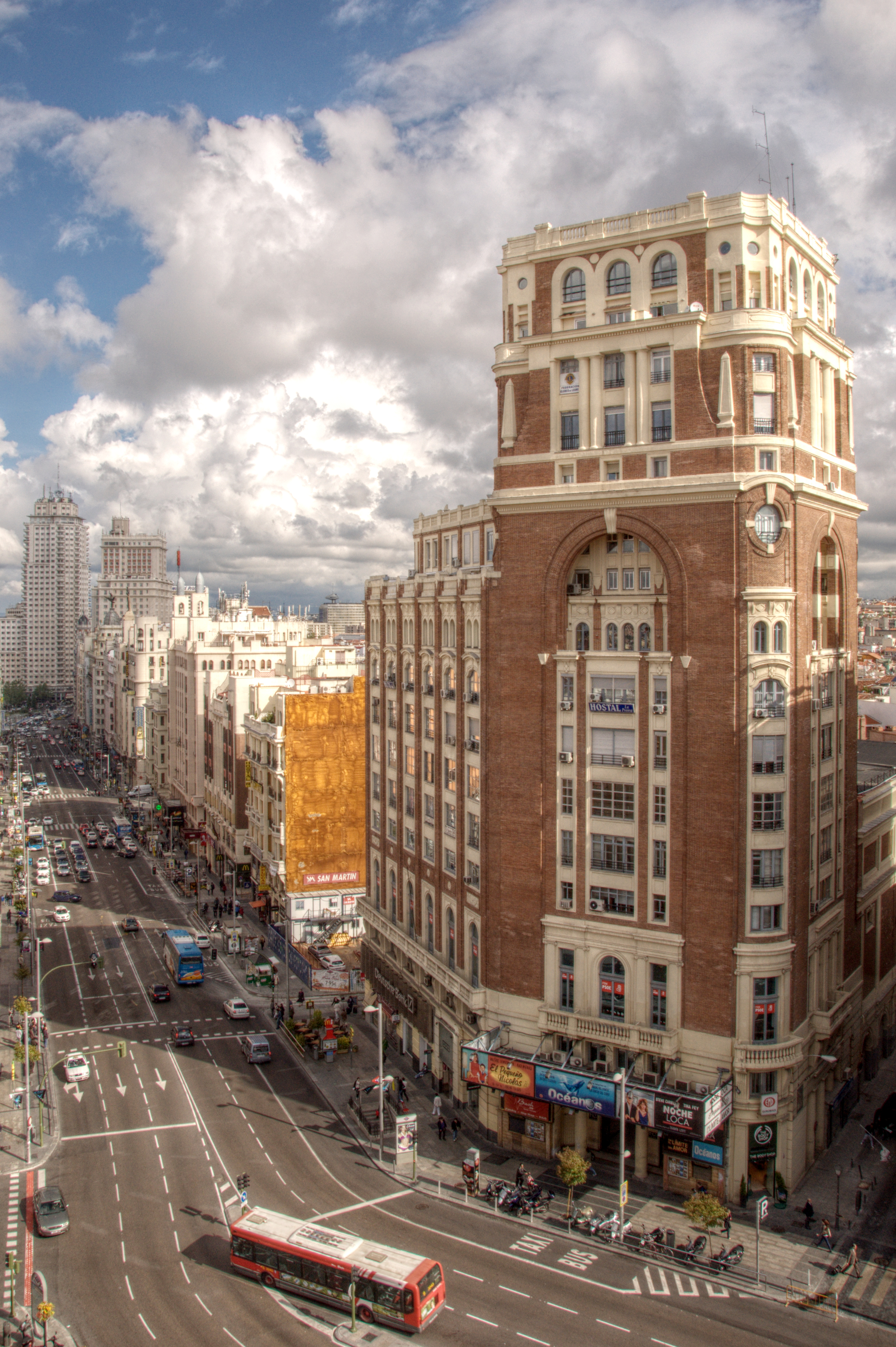
- Interactive map of the Palacio de la Prensa area

General information
- Location: Gran Vía 46, Madrid, Spain
- Coordinates: 40°25′13″N 3°42′21″W
- Construction started: 11 July 1925
- Completed: 1929
- Opening: 7 April 1930

Height
- Roof: 58 metres (190 ft)

Technical details
- Floor count: 16

Design and construction
- Architect: Pedro Muguruza

The Palacio de la Prensa is a brick-clad building in Madrid, Spain.

== History and description ==
It is located in the Gran Vía, near the Callao Square, in the Universidad neighborhood.

Commissioned by the Madrid Press Association (APM) to serve as corporative headquarters, the building was designed by Pedro Muguruza. The first sketches date from 1924. It was intended to provide a mixed use, including apartments for rent, offices, a movie theatre (ultimately located in the northern end of the plot) and a concert hall. The three different volumes the building features convey this circumstance. The 16-floor southern tower rises to a height of 58 metres.

Buildings works started on 11 July 1925.

Works finished by 1929. The building opened on 2 January 1930 with a projection of The Way of All Flesh, although it was formally inaugurated on 7 April 1930. After mortgaging the building because of huge debts accumulated during the Francoist dictatorship, the APM decided to move its headquarters to a small palace in the Salamanca district for free. Two floors of the building hosted the headquarters of the regional branch of the PSOE from 2009 to 2015.

It was declared Bien de Interés Patrimonial ("Good of Patrimonial Interest", BIP) by the regional government in 2017.
