= Triumph Square =

Plaza in Seville, Spain

Coordinates: 37°23′6.11″N 5°59′32.53″W

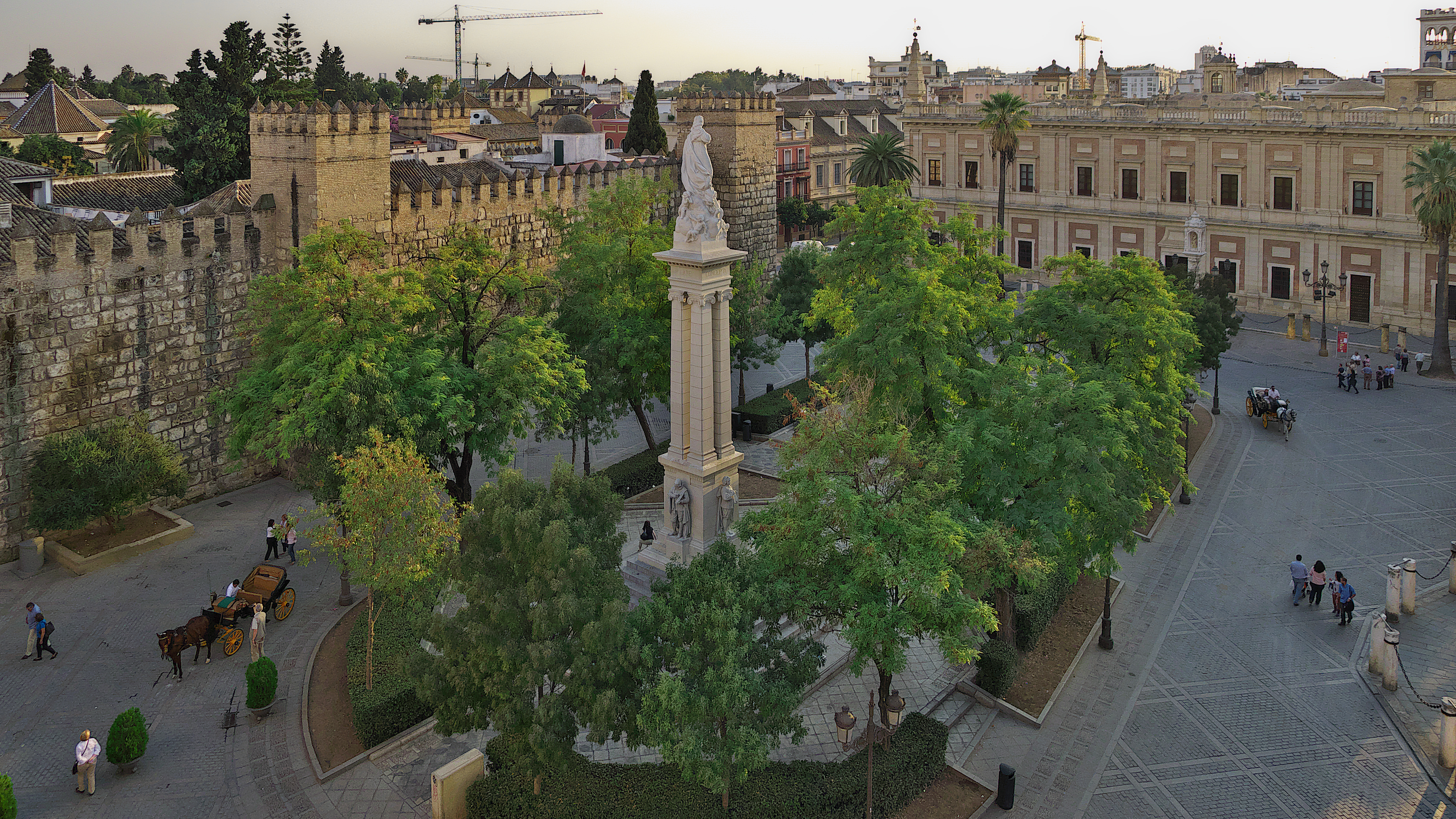
Plaza del Triunfo in Seville

Triumph Square (Spanish: Plaza del Triunfo;) is a plaza in Seville, Spain. It is located at the center of a group of buildings declared a World Heritage Site in 1987: the General Archive of the Indies, the Alcázar of Seville, and Seville Cathedral.

At the beginning of the construction of the Seville Cathedral, in the 15th century, this square was known as the Plaza de los Cantos, while later it was called Plaza del Hospital del Rey.

The square takes its current name from a Baroque-style shrine located beside the Archive of the Indies, known as the Templete del Triunfo de Nuestra Señora del Patrocinio (Shrine of the Triumph of Our Lady of Patronage), which houses an image of the Virgin and Child and was built in 1757 to commemorate the 1755 Lisbon earthquake.

The plaza contains a monument to the Immaculate Conception by Lorenzo Coullaut Valera. The monument was inaugurated in 1918 and was part of a beautification project by the city in preparation for the Ibero-American Exposition of 1929. Its base features four statues of illustrious 17th century figures from Seville: Bartolomé Esteban Murillo, Miguel Cid, Juan Martínez Montañés, and Juan de Pineda.

== Gallery ==
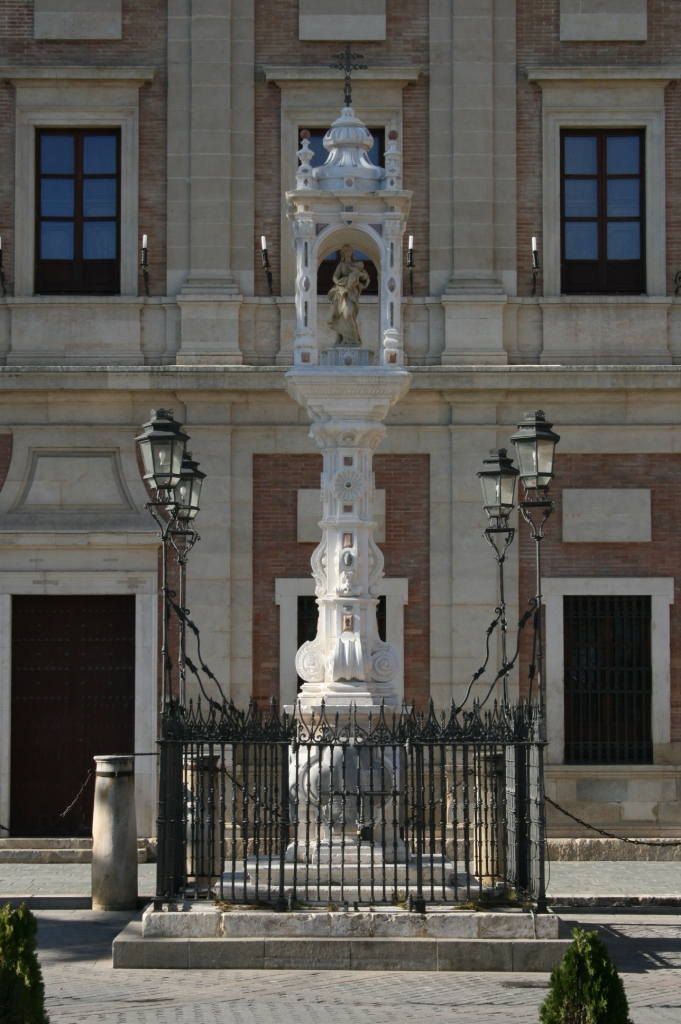
The square is named after the Triumph Shrine.
