= Federico Coullaut-Valera Mendigutia =

Spanish sculptor

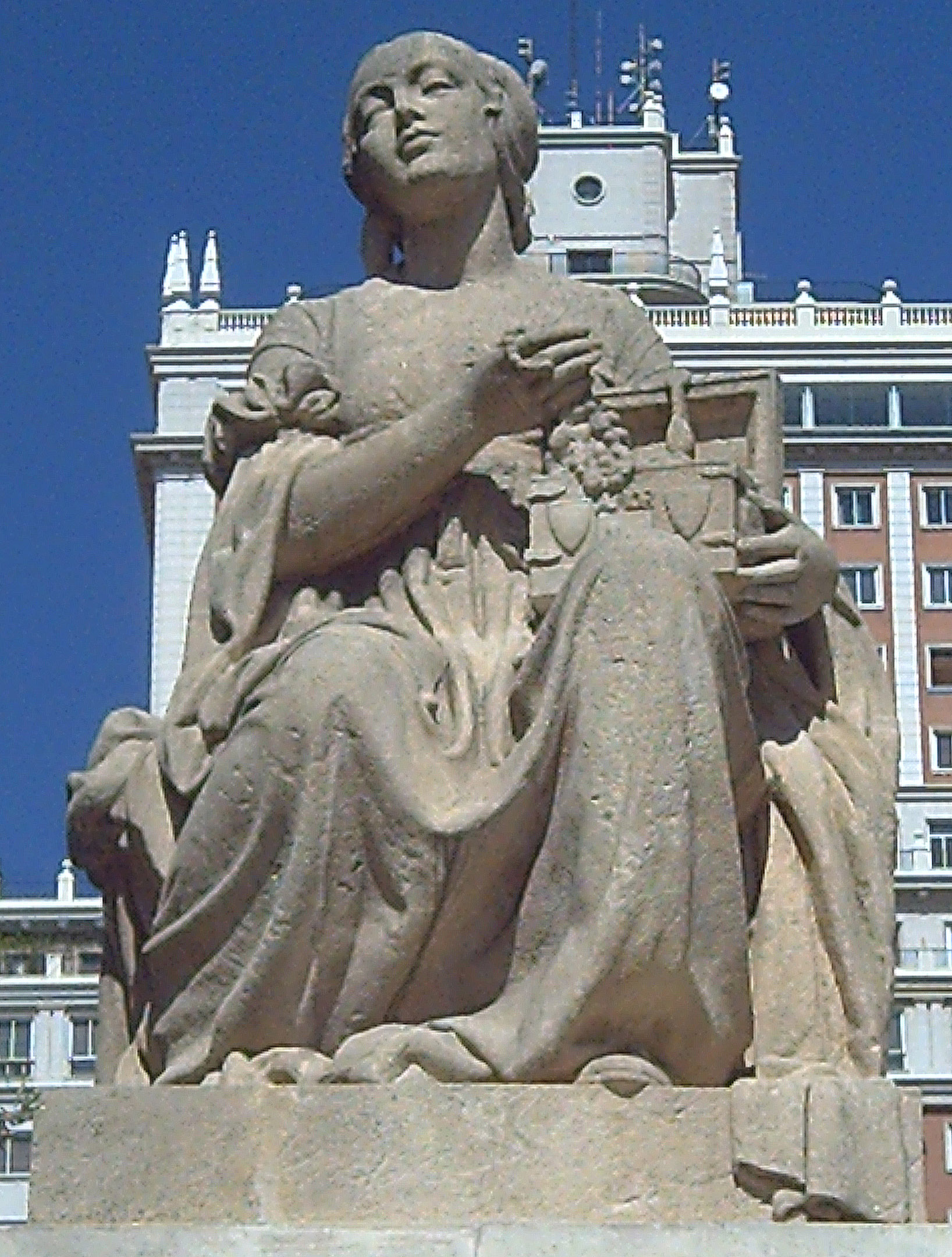
Dulcinea (1957), sculpture by Federico Coullaut-Valera. Madrid (Spain).

Federico Coullaut-Valera Mendigutia (1912–1989) was a Spanish sculptor. The son of sculptor Lorenzo Coullaut-Valera, he was born in Madrid.

He continued the work begun by his father in the Plaza de España. Coullaut-Valera Mendigutia finished the monument in this square between 1956 and 1957.

A statue of Charles III of Spain by Coullaut-Valera stands in Olvera Street, Los Angeles. It was presented in 1976 and dedicated by Juan Carlos I of Spain and Sofia of Spain in 1987. Charles had ordered the founding of the town that became Los Angeles.

Coullaut-Valera was Luis Sanguino's teacher. Sanguino had asked sculptor Mariano Benlliure to be his teacher, but Benlliure thought that his advancing age would make him a bad choice, and instead recommended that Sanguino seek out Coullaut-Valera.

== Works ==
- Victoria Alada, Edificio Metrópolis, Madrid (1977)
