= Pedro Muguruza =

Spanish architect (1893–1952)

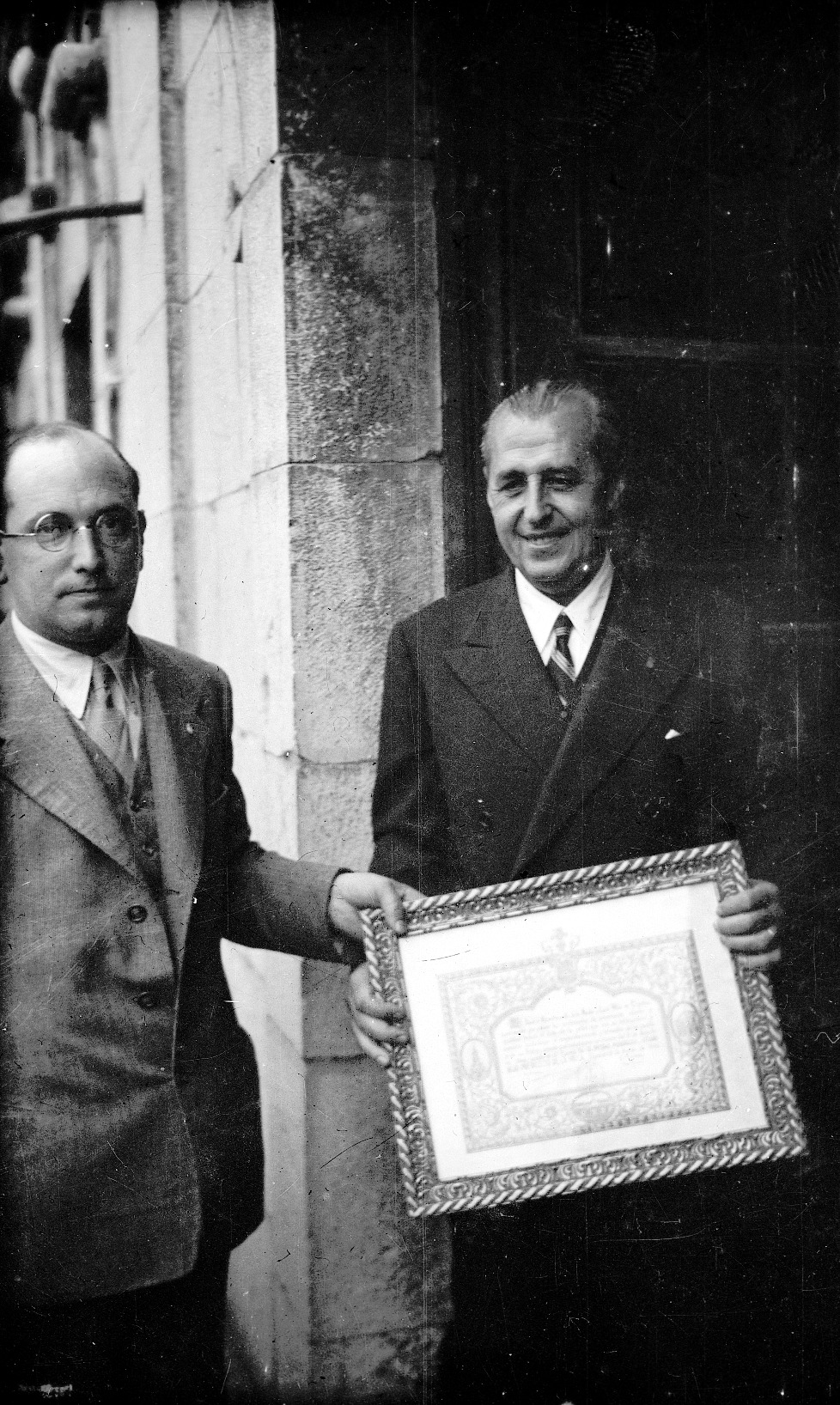

Director-General for Architecture
- In office 30 September 1939 – 8 March 1946

Personal details
- Born: 25 May 1893 Madrid
- Died: 3 February 1952 (aged 58) Madrid
- Occupation: Architect, illustrator, politician, goalkeeper, professor

Pedro Muguruza Otaño (1893–1952) was a Spanish architect and Falangist politician.

== Biography ==
Born in Madrid on 25 May 1893, his family came from Elgoibar (Gipuzkoa). (Note: Elgoibar is often sourced to be his birthplace.) He earned an architecture degree from the School of Architecture of Madrid in 1916, where he met other future notable architects such as Secundino Zuazo, Leopoldo Torres Balbás or Luis Gutiérrez Soto. He gained a reputation as an exceptional draughtsman when he studied at the School of Architecture. A sports enthusiast, he played goalkeeper for Atlético de Madrid.

In 1917, soon after graduating, Muguruza started to work as lecturer at the School of Architecture thanks to a proposal by Ricardo Velázquez Bosco, and, in March 1920, he finally obtained a Chair of "Projects of Architectural and Ornamental Details".

He married Mercedes Peironcely y Puig de la Bellacasa in 1921. They had no issue.

Among the projects he authored in the 1920s: the France Station in Barcelona (1923), the Palacio de la Prensa in the Gran Vía (1925), the 40-metre high monument to the sacred Heart of Jesus in Bilbao (topped by a sculpture of Lorenzo Coullaut Valera) or the housing project for the Plaza de Rubén Darío (1929). He also led the projects for the restoration of the Monastery of El Paular and the Prado Museum.

During the Second Republic he authored some markets, such as Santa María de la Cabezas's (1933) or Maravillas (1935).

After the outbreak of the Civil War in 1936, Muguruza fled from the Republican area and joined the Francoist side. Franco entrusted him the task or reorganizing the architecture in the territory controlled by the rebels. Muguruza assumed as member of the Real Academia de Bellas Artes de San Fernando in 1938. In June 1939, only 3 months after the Francoist victory in the war, he presided over the Assembly of architects in Madrid, setting the ideological foundations behind the architecture of the new regime. Already Chief of the Services of Architecture of FET y de las JONS, he was appointed to the leadership of the Directorate General for Architecture, structured along totalitarian lines. Muguruza served in the post from 30 September 1939 to 8 March 1946.

Muguruza and his disciple Diego Méndez were the architects who designed the Valle de los Caídos; they aimed to make the site an eternal metaphor of the regime's ideology. He directed the building works until leaving in 1949, reportedly because of a degenerative paralysis; he was replaced by Méndez.

Muguruza died on 3 February 1952 in Madrid.
