= Statue of Marcelino Menéndez y Pelayo =

Menéndez y Pelayo
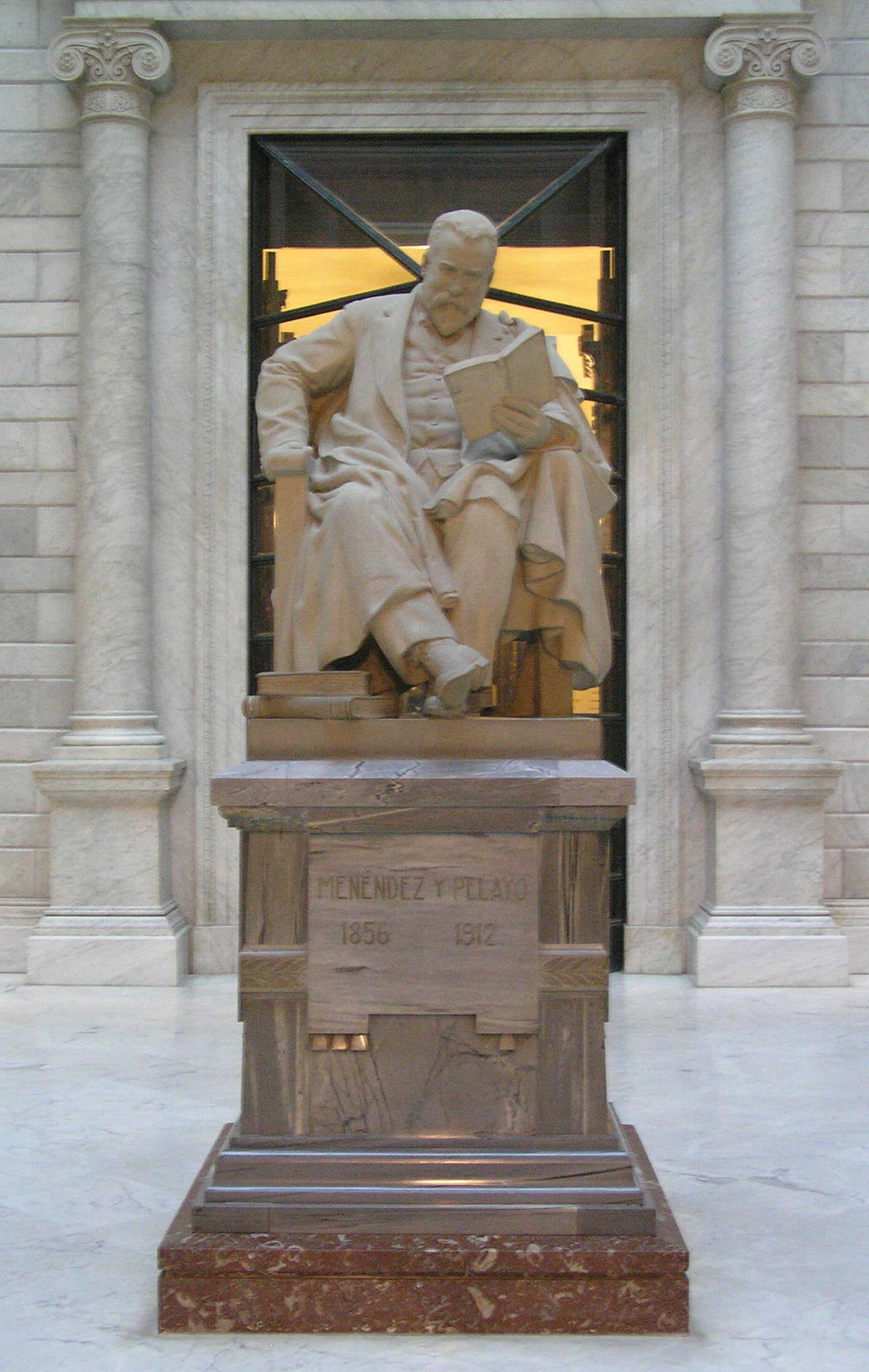
- Location: National Library of Spain, Madrid, Spain
- Coordinates: 40.423669444444°N 3.6897777777778°W
- Designer: Lorenzo Coullaut Valera
- Material: Limestone
- Length: 133 cm (statue)
- Width: 116 cm (statue)
- Height: 164 cm (statue)
- Opening date: 26 June 1917
- Dedicated to: Marcelino Menéndez Pelayo

The statue of Marcelino Menéndez y Pelayo is a monument in Madrid, Spain. A work by Lorenzo Coullaut Valera, it consists of a limestone statue of the aforementioned philologist and it is installed in the lobby of the National Library of Spain.

== History and description ==
An initiative of the Junta Central de Acción Católica after the death of Menéndez Pelayo in 1912, the idea was endorsed by the director of the National Library of Spain (BNE), Francisco Rodríguez Marín. The project was entrusted to Lorenzo Coullaut Valera and the sculptor presented the plaster model by 1916. Made of limestone from Novelda, the monument was unveiled on 26 June 1917.

The statue consists of a mature Menéndez Pelayo (while in charge of the BNE) seated on an armchair, reading a book. The frontal inscription reads menéndez y pelayo / 1856 1912, the lateral ones reference Menéndez Pelayo's posts as director of the BNE and the Royal Academy while the backside reads los católicos españoles / por iniciativa / de la / junta central / de / acción católica.

Education Minister Fernando de los Ríos attempted to move the statue to another location in the 1930s, yet he was dissuaded by BNE director Miguel Artigas, who warned him it would be considered a sectarian action either way.

On 8 March 2006 the BNE director Rosa Regàs tentatively announced the move of the statue from the library's lobby to the exterior gardens. The proposed move raised criticism in a number of instances of the public opinion (most notably from Cantabria). It was also criticised by the speaker of the PP in the Committee of Culture of the Congress of Deputies, Beatriz Rodríguez Salmones. Regàs counter-argued that (Ménendez Pelayo) "will never have a company as good as the one in the garden", accompanied by the likes of Cervantes, Lope de Vega, San Isidoro, or Nebrija. Following months of heated controversy, Regàs rectified and announced the dismissal of the plans to move the statue to the exterior garden in October 2006, on the basis of the reported fragility of the stone from Novelda. Years later, Regás still wondered about the ruckus the "extreme right media" had created around the move, claiming her intention was always to place the statue in a privileged location.
