= House of Gallardo =

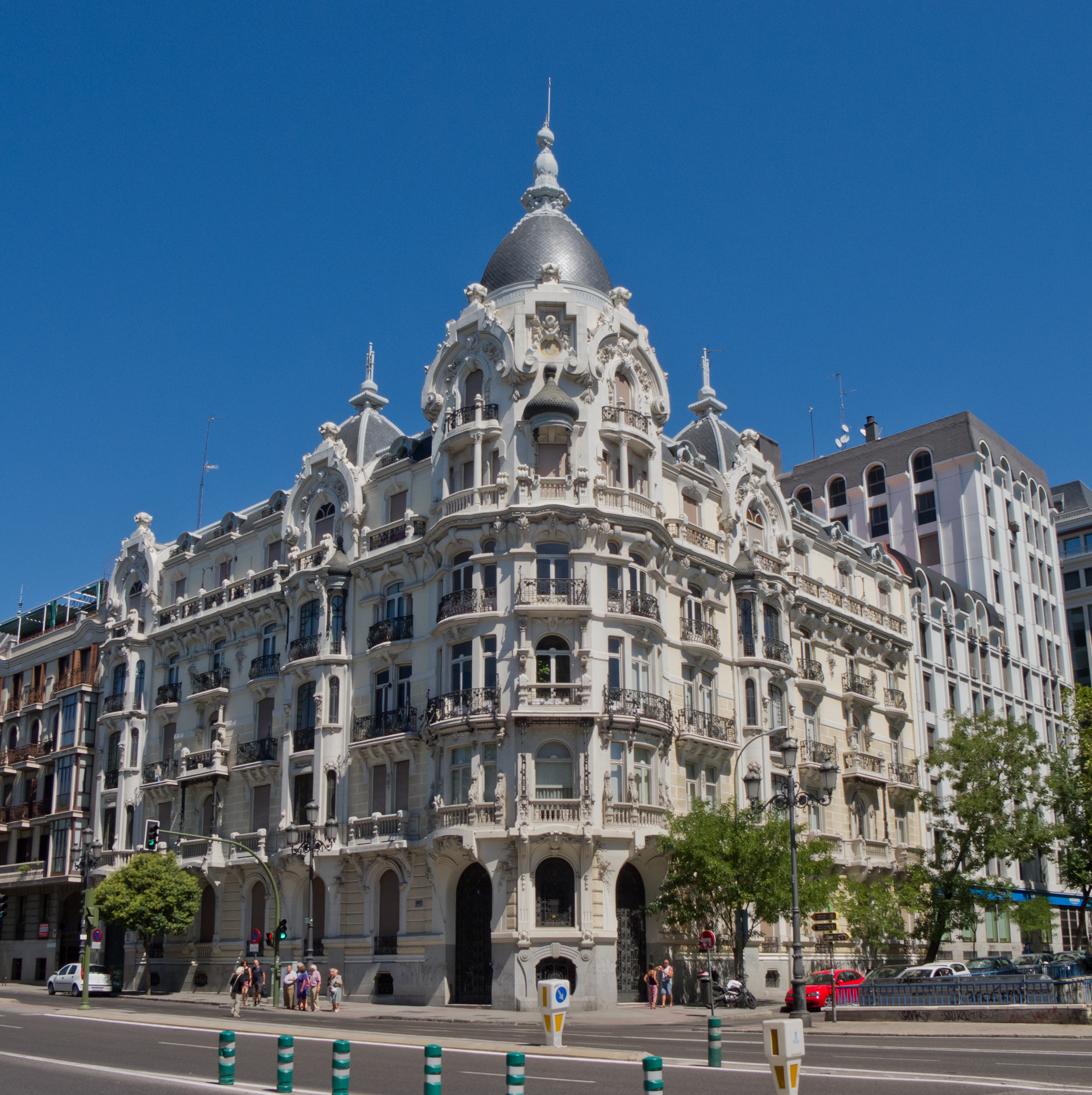
- Interactive map of the House of Gallardo area

General information
- Location: Calle de Ferraz 2, Madrid, Spain
- Coordinates: 40.423205°N 3.714225°W
- Construction started: 1911
- Completed: 1914

Design and construction
- Architect: Federico Arias Rey

The House of Gallardo (Spanish: Casa Gallardo) is a building located in Madrid, Spain.

Projected by Federico Arias Rey, it is one of the relatively few modernista buildings preserved in Madrid. It was declared Bien de Interés Cultural in 1997. It is located in calle de Ferraz 2, near the plaza de España.
