= Victoria Alada (Madrid) =

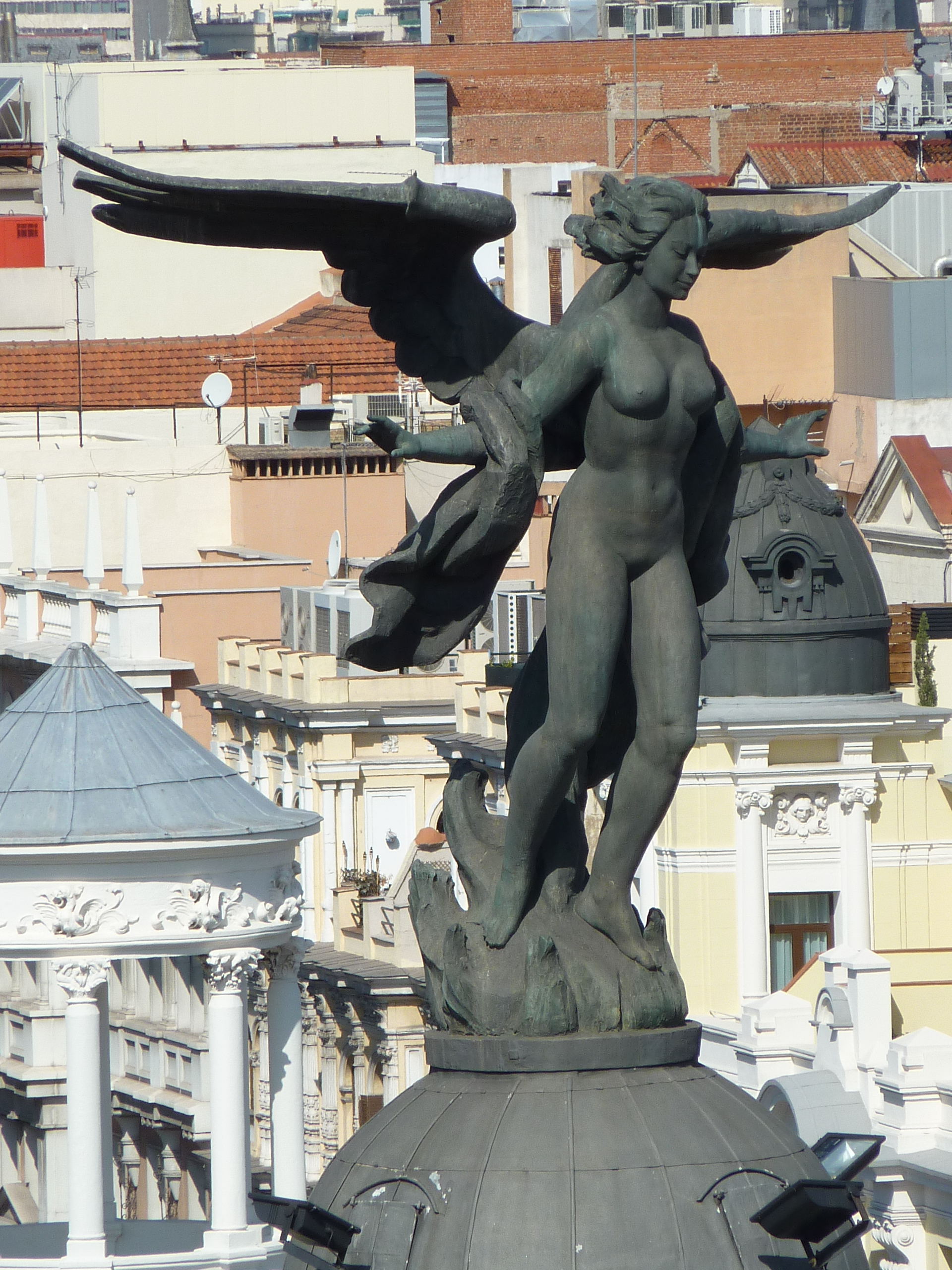
- Artist: Federico Coullaut-Valera
- Completion date: 11 October 1977
- Medium: Bronze
- Dimensions: 6 m (20 ft)
- Weight: 3,000 kg
- Location: Edificio Metrópolis, Gran Vía 39, Madrid, Spain

Victoria Alada ("Winged Victory") is a bronze statue depicting a winged victory (Nike) topping the dome of the Edificio Metrópolis in Gran Vía 39, Madrid, Spain.

== History and description ==
The dome of the building (the tallest in Madrid at the time of its opening in 1911, erected as premises of La Unión y el Fénix Español) was originally topped by a sculptural group by René de Saint-Marceaux depicting Ganymede and a Phoenix bird. Following the purchase in 1972 of the building by a company named Metropólis and the declared intention of La Unión y el Fénix Español to take the original sculptural group elsewhere, a project for a new sculpture was entrusted to Federico Coullaut-Valera. Standing 6 metre high and weighing 3000 kg (double than the sculptural group of Ganymede and the Phoenix), the new sculpture, consisting of a winged victory, was cast in bronze. It was thus installed on the dome on 11 October 1977. The original sculptural group was moved to Castellana 33, next to the new La Unión y el Fénix Español headquarters, also spawning some replicas. By 2018, the Real Academia de Bellas Artes de San Fernando reported that the original sculptural group in Castellana 33 had been removed from its location and "probably" destroyed.

The original plaster cast of the winged victory was auctioned for 2,200 euros in June 2019.

The use of a fully dressed "Catholic angel-like" reimagination of the statue (rather than the real naked figure of Nike) as part of a Christmas card published by the Ayuntamiento de Madrid generated online controversy in December 2020.
