= Plaza de España, Madrid =

Square in Madrid, Spain

Plaza de España
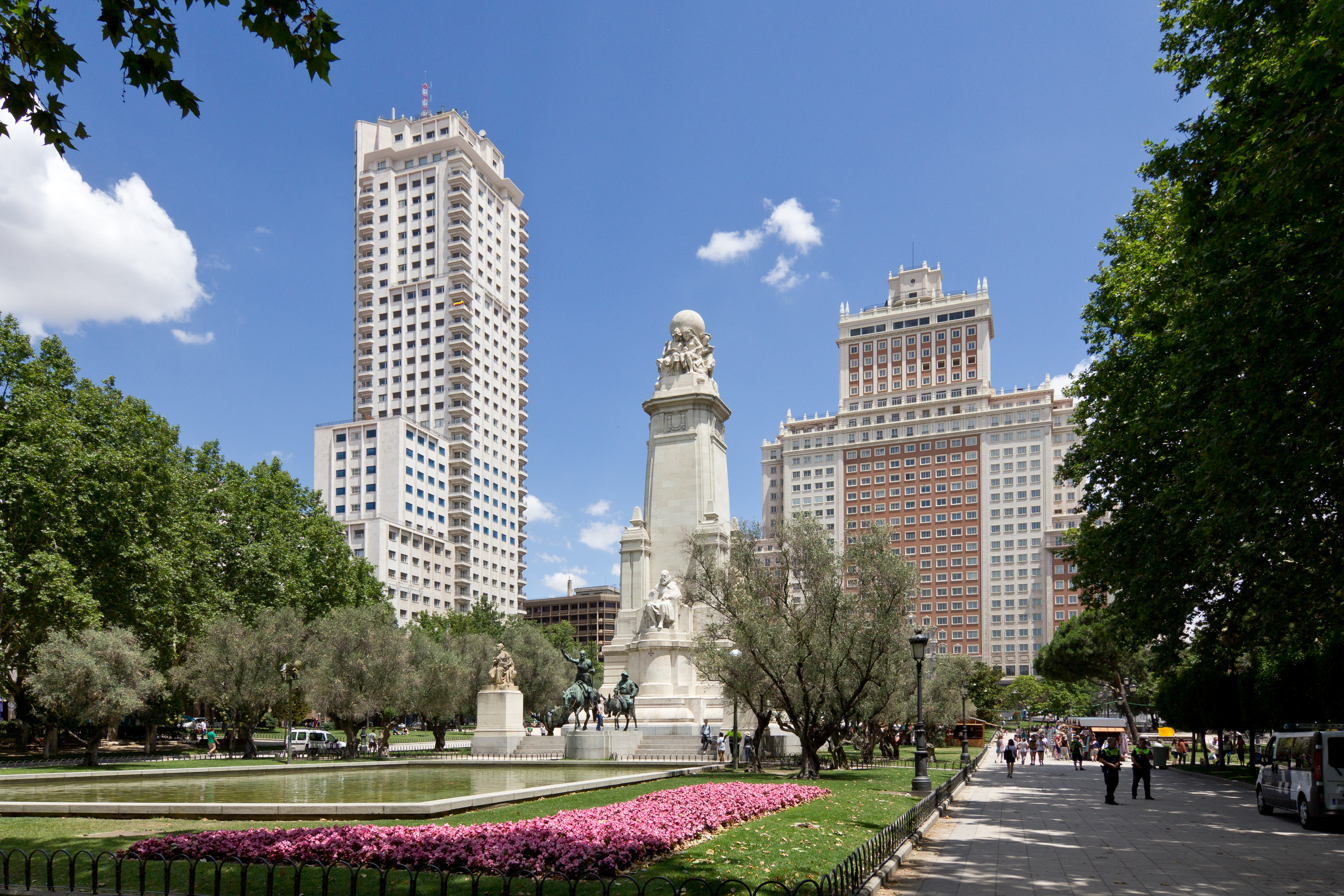
- The Torre de Madrid (left), Cervantes Monument (center), and the Edificio España (right)
- Type: square
- Maintained by: Ayuntamiento of Madrid
- Location: Madrid, Spain
- Coordinates: 40.423261°N 3.712594°W

Plaza de España (Spanish for 'Spain Square') is a large square and popular tourist destination located in central Madrid, Spain at the western end of the Gran Vía. It features a monument to Miguel de Cervantes Saavedra and is adjacent to two of Madrid's most prominent skyscrapers. Additionally, the Palacio Real (Royal Palace) is only a short walk south from the plaza. After 2 1/2 years of renovation, on 22 November 2021, the square was reopened for pedestrians.

== Cervantes Monument ==
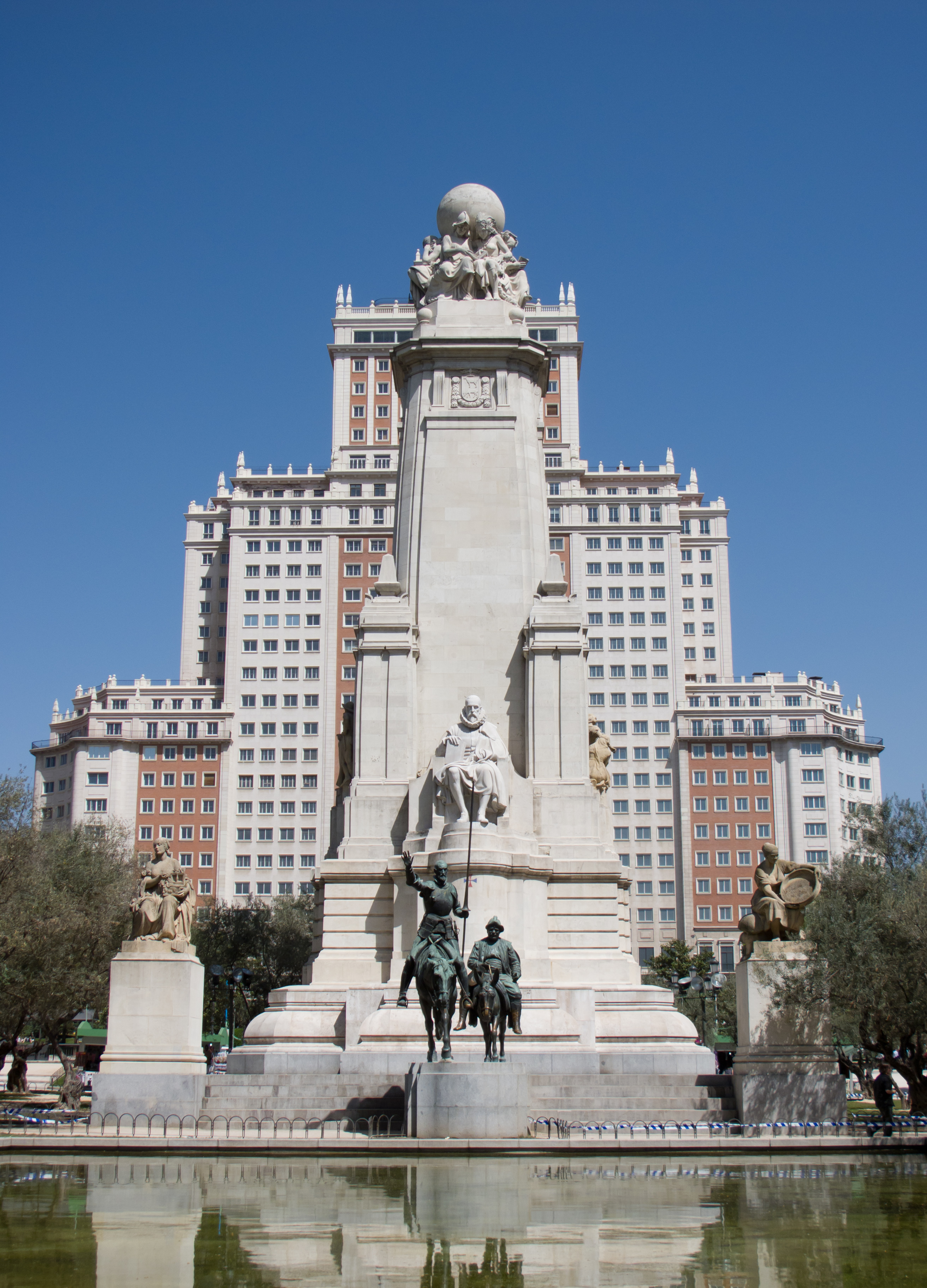
Madrid's Plaza de España

Right in the center of the square is the monument to Miguel de Cervantes, created at the same time as the square itself. Around the monument, a series of landscaped spaces were created for the enjoyment and rest of passers-by.

In front of the statue of Don Quixote and Sancho Panza, a pond of rectangular form is located that forms one of the best known views of the Spanish capital, along with the Torre de Madrid and Edificio España behind it. Initially, the statues of Don Quixote and Sancho Panza were located, approximately, in what is now the center of the pond, since it was later made. The base of the monument is in granite, with the sculpture made of red stone from Sepúlveda (and some additions in bronze).

Its accomplishment was carried out on the occasion of the third centenary of the publication of the second part of Don Quixote, in 1915, and which continued with the centenary of the death of the writer (1616), in 1916. The author of the project was the architect and sculptor Rafael Martínez Zapatero, who counted on the collaboration of Pedro Muguruza Otaño. The sculptures added were the work of Lorenzo Coullaut Valera.

The figures that make up this emblematic monument have, on the one hand, a seated Cervantes and at the base of the monument, and under the feet of the writer, are the statues of Don Quixote and Sancho Panza. The set was finalized when the figures of Dulcinea and Aldonza Lorenzo were added, also characters of the Cervantes novel. Alluding to the universality of Don Quixote, the monument also contemplates the five continents, all of them reading the work of Cervantes. On the other side and above the fountains, is represented the Spanish Literature, dressed in period and holding a book with his right hand. The tree that predominates in the landscaping of the square is the olive tree, in homage to the La Mancha fields in the wanderings of Don Quixote and Sancho.

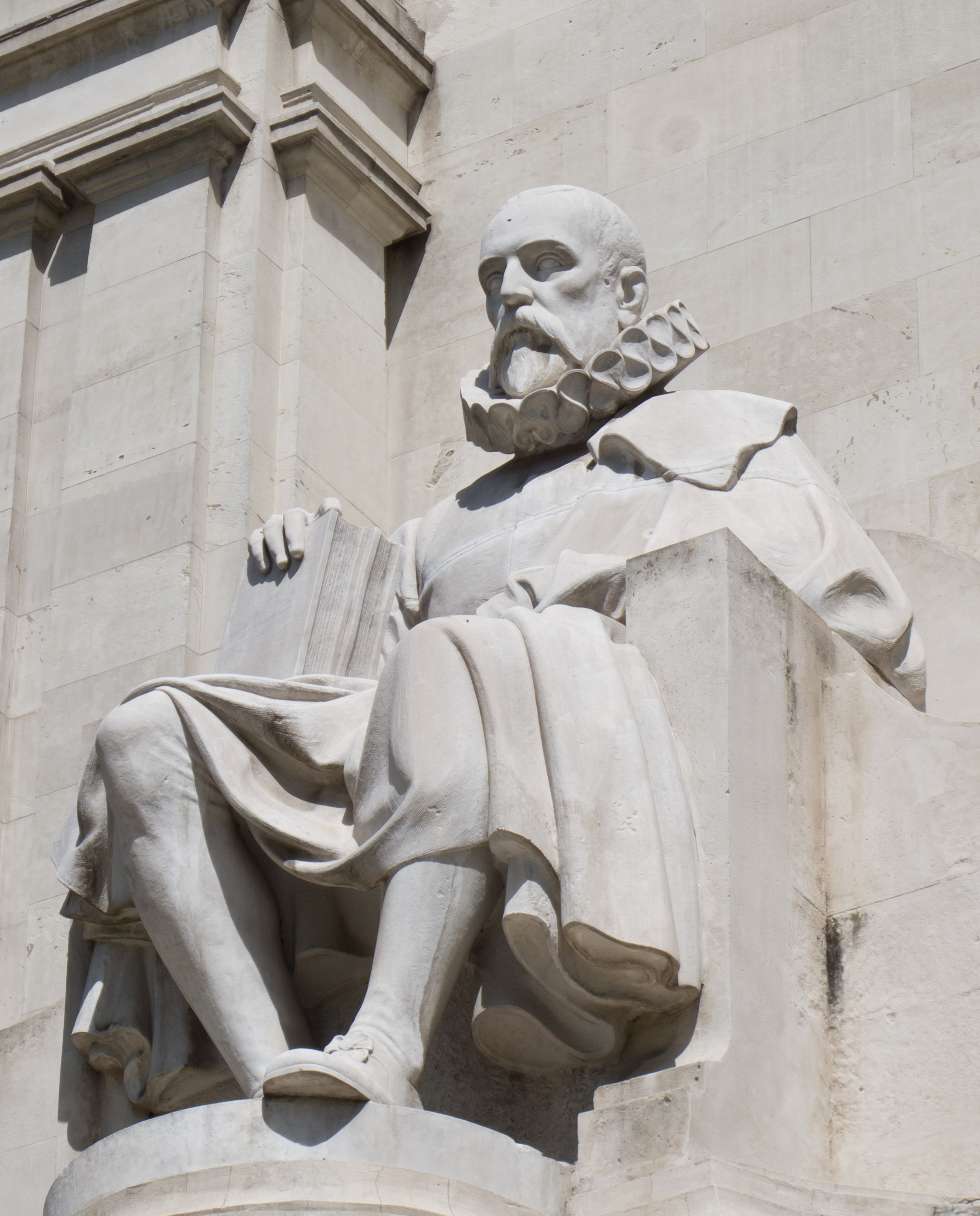
Stone sculpture of Miguel de Cervantes

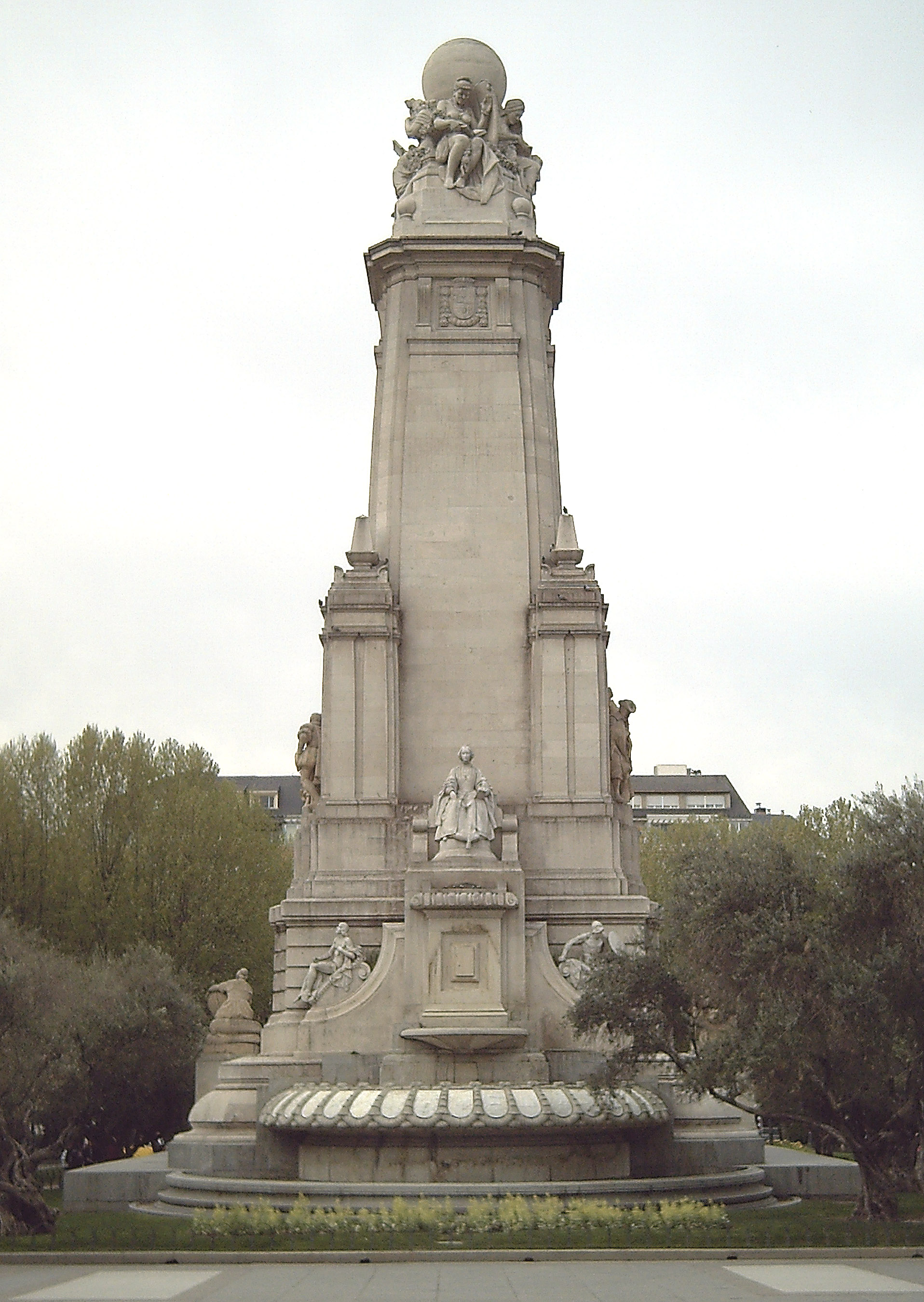
North-eastern side of the Cervantes monument

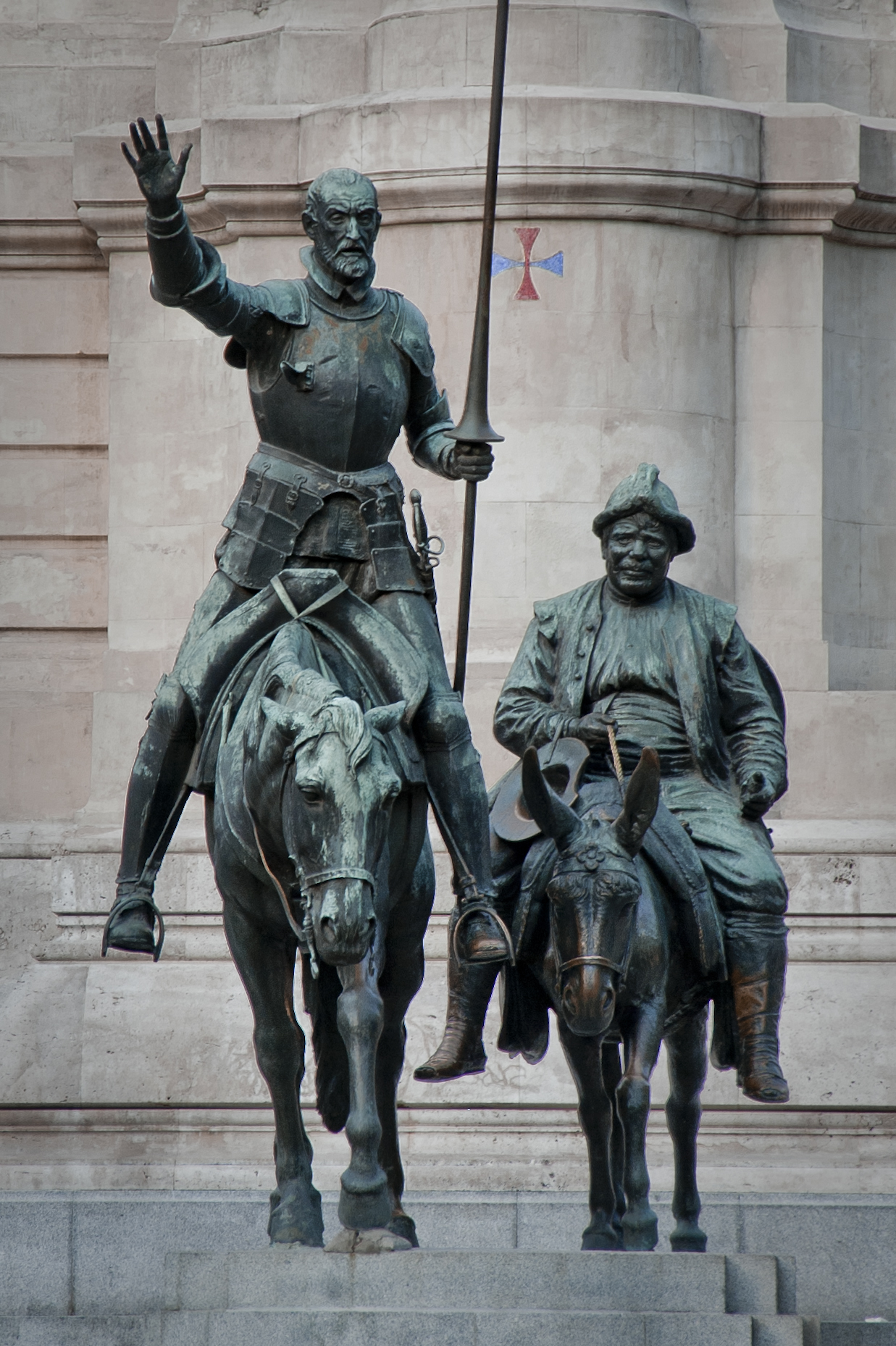
Bronze sculptures of Don Quixote and Sancho Panza

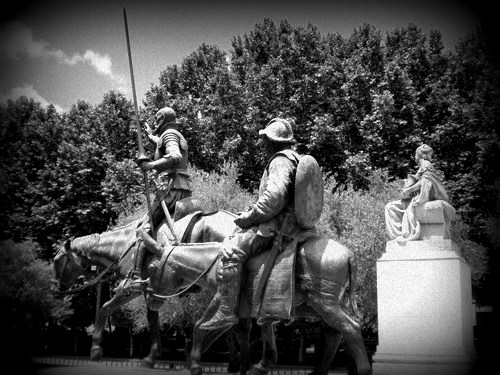
Bronze sculptures of Don Quixote and Sancho Panza

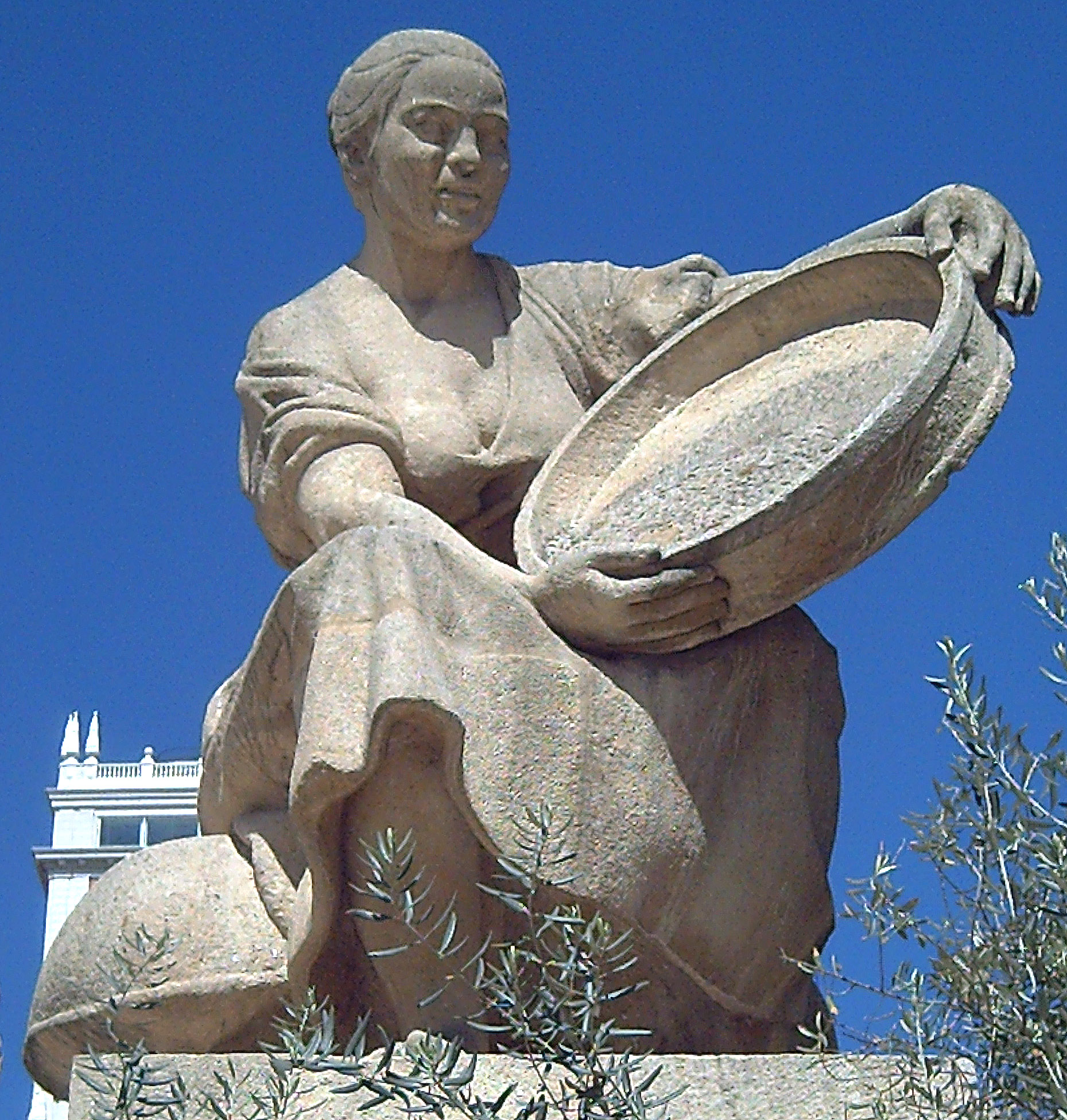
Stone sculpture of Aldonza Lorenzo

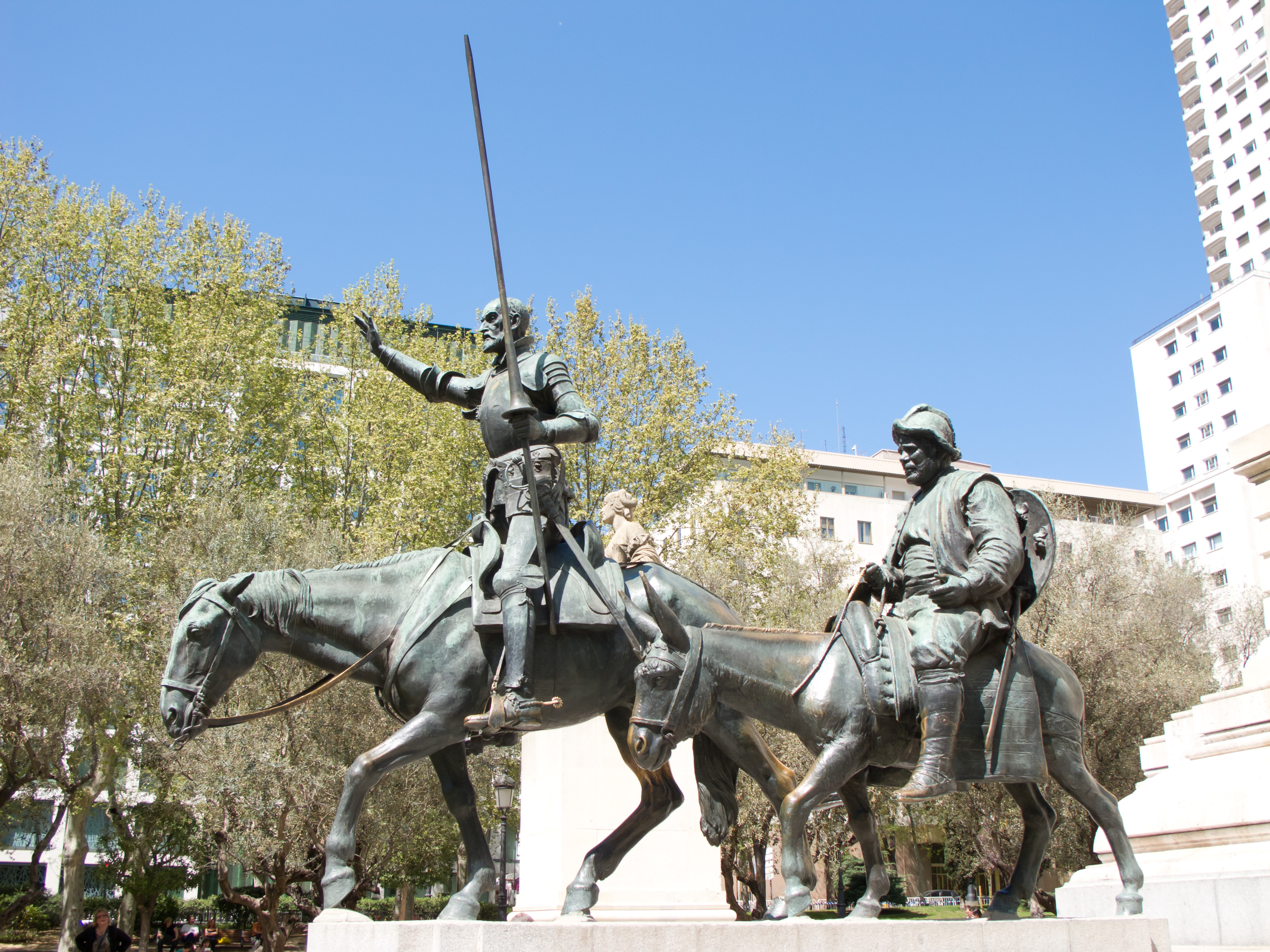
Plaza de España, Madrid.

== Surrounding buildings ==
Adjacent to the plaza are two of the tallest buildings in Madrid, the 142 m (466 ft) Torre de Madrid ("Madrid Tower"), built in 1957, and the 117 m (384 ft) tall Edificio España ("Spain Building"), built in 1953.

There you will also find the House of Gallardo, built in 1911 and considered one of the notable examples of the Art Nouveau style of architecture in the city.

== Metro station ==
Plaza de España is also the name of a Metro station located on the eastern corner of the plaza, serviced by the #3 and #10 lines, with a connection to the #2 line.

== History ==
In The Third of May 1808, Francisco de Goya painted the shootings in what is now the Plaza.

In 1808, the area was part of the Príncipe Pío hill. It was one of the locations used by French firing squads to execute prisoners taken during the May 2nd uprising.

== See also ==
- Al pueblo del dos de mayo de 1808
