= Lorenzo Coullaut Valera =

Spanish sculptor

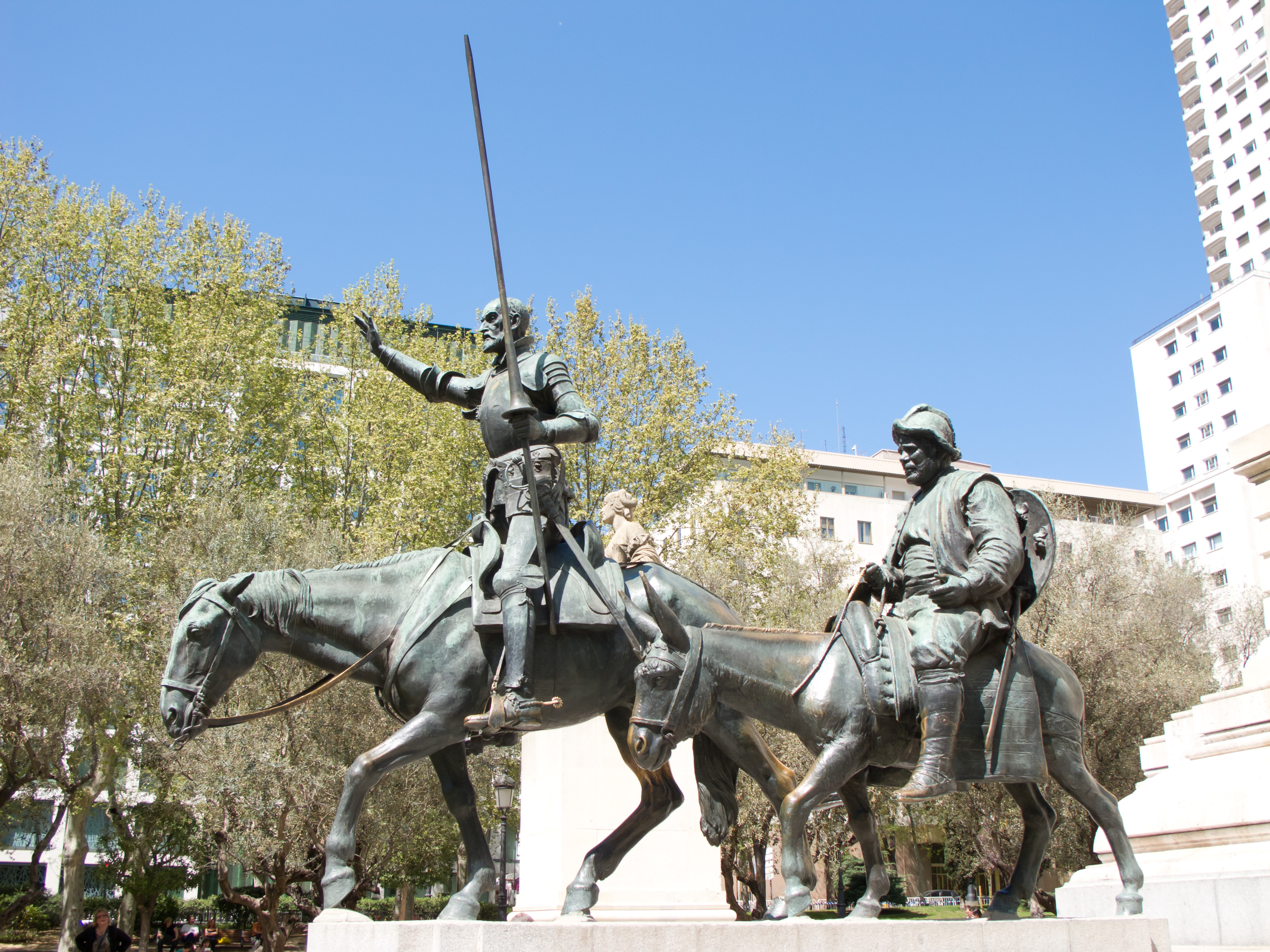
Monument to Miguel de Cervantes, Plaza de España, Madrid

Lorenzo Coullaut Valera (1876 – 1932) was a Spanish sculptor. Born in Marchena, he grew up in Nantes where his family had moved. He studied at the Livet Lyceum and returned to Spain in 1893. At Seville, he studied at the studios of Antonio Susillo and Agustí Querol Subirats.

With the support of his uncle, Juan Valera, whose bust he sculpted, Coullaut Valera participated in the National Exposition of Belles Artes in 1897, and received Honorable Mention. Much of the work of Coullaut Valera can be seen in public squares in cities across Spain, as well as in Latin America. He died in Madrid.

Federico Coullaut-Valera, his son, was also a sculptor who has designed public monuments. His student Luis Sanguino is also known for lavish public monuments, both in Spain and in the Americas.

== Selected works ==
- 1913 - Monumento los Saineteros, Madrid
- 1914 - Monument of Campoamor, Madrid
- 1916 - Monument of Pardo Bazán, A Coruña
- 1917 - Monument of Menéndez Pelayo, Madrid
- 1918 - Monument of the Immaculate Conception, Plaza del Triunfo, Seville
- 1926 - Monument of Hosius of Córdoba, Córdoba
- 1928 - Monument of Juan Valera, Madrid
- 1930 - Monument of Miguel de Cervantes, Madrid
- 1931 - Monument of Bruno Mauricio de Zabala, Montevideo
- La Caridad Real in a Monument of Alfonso XII, Retiro Gardens,
