= List of tallest buildings in Madrid =

Skyline of Madrid Horizonte de Madrid
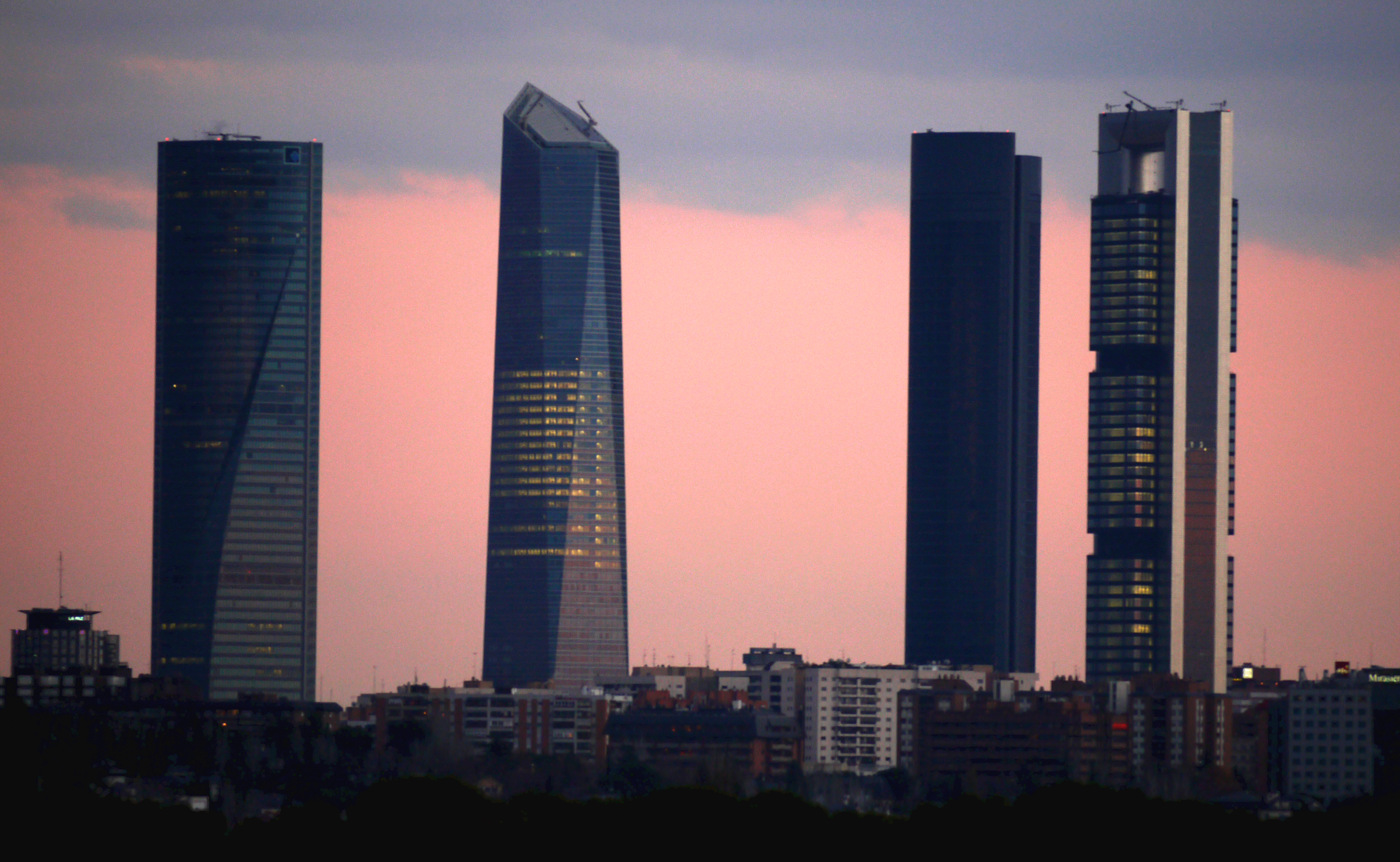
- The Cuatro Torres Business Area in 2010
- Tallest building: Torre de Cristal (2008)
- Tallest building height: 249 m (817 ft)
- Major clusters: Cuatro Torres; AZCA
- First 150 m+ building: Torre Picasso (1989)

Number of tall buildings (2026)
- Taller than 75 m (246 ft): 40
- Taller than 100 m (328 ft): 19
- Taller than 150 m (492 ft): 6
- Taller than 200 m (656 ft): 4

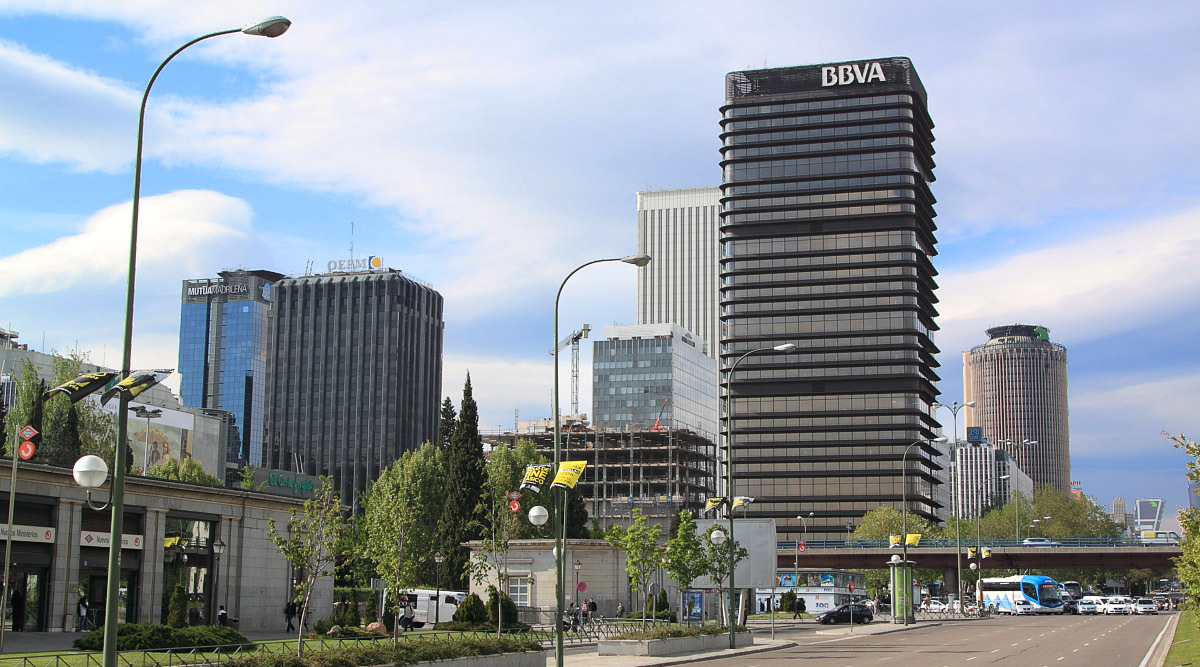
The AZCA district in 2010

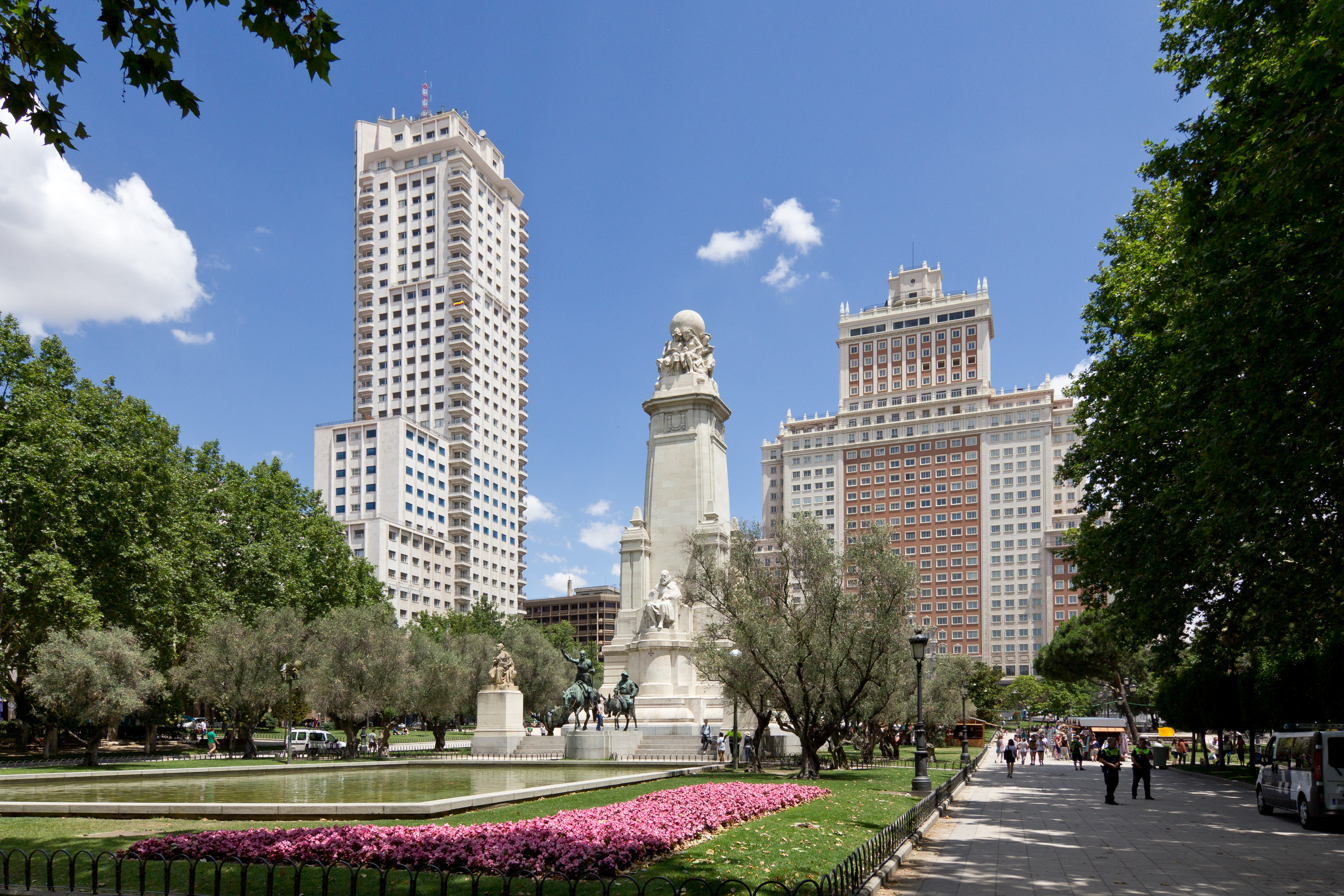
The Torre de Madrid (left) and the Edificio España (right) on the Plaza de España

Madrid is the capital and largest city of Spain, with a metropolitan area population of approximately 6.8 million. Since 2008, the tallest building in Madrid and in Spain has been the Torre de Cristal, which reaches 249 m (817 ft) and 50 storeys in height. The city is the site of over 200 high-rise structures, of which 19 stand taller than 100 m (328 ft) as of 2026. Six skyscrapers surpass a height of 150 m (656 ft), the most of any city in Spain and the Iberian Peninsula. Madrid's five tallest buildings are located in the Cuatro Torres Business Area (CTBA), one of the city's two main business centres. The other, AZCA, is home to the Torre Picasso, the tallest building in Madrid from 1989 to 2008 and the tallest outside of the CTBA.

In the early 20th century, several tall buildings were constructed in the Gran Vía and Calle de Alcalá area. While they would not be considered skyscrapers today, their height and structure was innovative at the time. These included the Metropolis Building, the Palacio de la Prensa, the La Unión y el Fénix Español building, the Edificio Capitol, and the Círculo de Bellas Artes. Most notable was the Telefónica Building, which is considered the first "true" skyscraper in Madrid and in Spain, and one of the first erected in Europe. In the 1950s, two significant skyscrapers were built on the Plaza de España in central Madrid: the Neo-Herrerian style Edificio España, the first building in the city to exceed 100 m (328 ft) in height, and the Torre de Madrid, the highest office building in Europe at the time of construction.

The 1970s and 1980s saw the development of the AZCA financial district in northern Madrid. In addition to the Torre Picasso, other office buildings in AZCA include the Torre Europa and Castellana 81 (formerly BBVA Tower), noted for its ochre glass exterior. The Windsor Tower was damaged by a fire in 2005 and subsequently demolished. It was replaced by the Torre Titania in 2011. The Cuatro Torres Business Area (CTBA), popularly known as "Las Cuatro Torres" (The Four Towers), was built between 2004 and 2009 on the site of Ciudad Deportiva, the former training ground of Real Madrid. The four skyscrapers that give the district its name are the Torre de Cristal, Torre Moeve, Torre PwC, and Torre Emperador. These skyscrapers were all completed in the late 2000s and are similar in height; the height difference between the Torre de Cristal and Torre Moeve is less than a metre (3 ft). A fifth skyscraper in the district, Caleido, was later added in 2021.

Both the CTBA and AZCA are located along the Paseo de la Castellana, a major thoroughfare in Madrid. Between the two districts are the Gate of Europe towers, a pair of 114 m (373 ft) skyscrapers built on both sides of the Paseo de la Castellana in 1996. Inclined at 15°, the pair were the first inclined buildings in the world. Northeast of the CTBA is the Isla de Chamartín district, a modern area first developed in the 2000s. Southern Madrid has relatively few tall buildings compared to the northern side of the city. Madrid Nuevo Norte (Madrid New North) is a major ongoing project that will add several more skyscrapers to the city's north. The tallest proposed building in the development would reach a height of 330 m (1,080 ft), becoming the city and Spain's first supertall skyscraper. Completion of Madrid Nuevo Norte is expected in 2045.

== History ==
Number of buildings by height in Madrid by the end of each year, based on the information in this article. This takes into account the demolished Windsor Tower. Click on the legend to toggle a specific height on or off. View chart definition.

== Map of tallest buildings ==
This map displays the location of most buildings taller than 75 m (246 ft) in Madrid. Each marker is numbered by the building's height rank, and coloured by the decade of its completion.

Buildings taller than 75 m (246 ft) in Madrid. An asterisk (*) next to the building's name indicates it is located outside the map.
- 1950s and before
- 1960s
- 1970s
- 1980s
- 1990s
- 2000s
- 2010s
- 2020s
1 Torre de Cristal
2 Torre Cepsa
3 Torre PwC
4 Torre Emperador
5 Caleido
6 Torre Picasso
7 Torre de Madrid
8 Torre Europa
9 Torres de Colón
10 Gate of Europe Tower 1
11 Gate of Europe Tower 2
12 Edificio España
13 Castellana 81
14 Torre Titania
15 Torre del Complejo Cuzco
16 Skyline Madrid Tower 1
17 Skyline Madrid Tower 2
18 Torres AXA 1
19 Torres AXA 2
20 Valencia Tower
21 La Vela
22 Hospital Central de la Defensa Gómez Ulla*
23 Telefónica Building
24 Torre Chamartín Merlin
25 Torre Mahou
26 Calle del Condado de Treviño 2
27 Capitán Haya 51
28 Torre Metropolitana
29 Torre Gestesa Chamartin
30 Entrerrios Apartments
31 Torres Blancas
32 Puerta de Chamartín
33 Calle Caleruega 50
34 Cuzco 4
35 Torre Ambar
36 Torre Castilla
37 Torre Australis
38 Torre Retiro
39 Edificio Bronce
40 Torre Panorama

== Cityscape ==
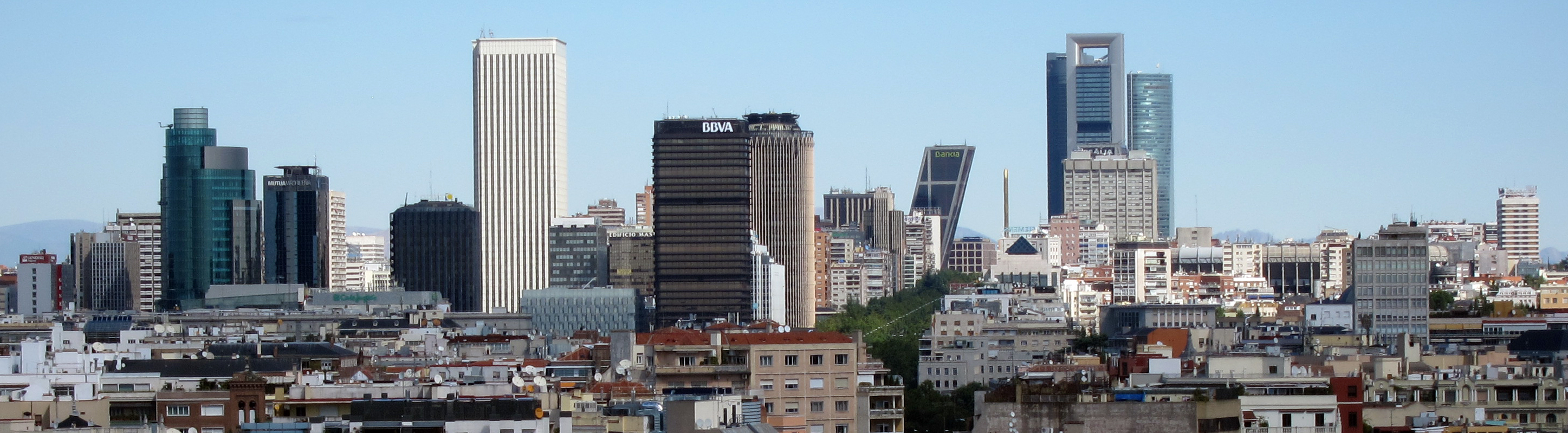
AZCA & CTBA business complexes, where most of the tallest buildings are located, in 2013

== Tallest buildings ==
This list ranks completed buildings in Madrid that stand at least 75 m (246 ft) tall as of 2026, based on standard height measurement. This includes spires and architectural details but does not include antenna masts. The “Year” column indicates the year of completion. Buildings tied in height are sorted by year of completion with earlier buildings ranked first, and then alphabetically. Estimated heights are indicated by italics.

Was the tallest building in Madrid upon completion

Rank	Name	Image	Location	Height m (ft)	Floors	Year	Purpose	Notes
1	Torre de Cristal		40°28′42″N 3°41′15″W	249 (817)	50	2008	Office	Tallest building in Madrid and Spain since 2008. Tallest building completed in Madrid in the 2000s.
2	Torre Moeve		40°28′33″N 3°41′16″W	248.3 (815)	49	2008	Office	Formerly known as the Torre Repsol, the Torre Caja Madrid, the Torre Bankia, and the Torre Cepsa.
3	Torre PwC		40°28′36″N 3°41′17″W	236 (774)	52	2008	Mixed-use	Mixed-use office and hotel building. Tallest mixed-use building in Madrid.
4	Torre Emperador		40°28′45″N 3°41′12″W	224.2 (736)	56	2008	Office	Officially known as the Torre Emperador Castellana. Formerly known as Torre Espacio (Space Tower).
5	Caleido		40°28′40″N 3°41′21″W	173.2 (568)	37	2021	Office	Tallest building completed in Madrid in the 2020s. The building occupies the former site of the Centro Internacional de Convenciones de la Ciudad de Madrid. The building houses IE University, and in the basement, there's a shopping mall.
6	Torre Picasso		40°27′01″N 3°41′35″W	156.4 (513)	43	1989	Office	Tallest building in Madrid from 1989 to 2008. Tallest building completed in Madrid in the 1980s.
7	Torre de Madrid		40°25′28″N 3°42′44″W	142 (466)	34	1957	Mixed-use	Mixed-use residential and office building. Tallest building in Madrid from 1957 to 1989. Tallest building completed in Madrid in the 1950s.
8	Torre Europa		40°27′05″N 3°41′30″W	116.1 (381)	33	1985	Office	
9	Torres de Colón		40°25′32″N 3°41′28″W	115.1 (378)	30	1976	Office	The towers were originally built at a height of 110.6 m (363 ft) in 1976, with 24 floors. A 1990 renovation connected the two towers via a suspended fire escape. Another renovation from 2020 to 2024 replaced the plug-shaped crown with two new four-story structures, carried out by Spanish architect Luis Vidal. Tallest building in Madrid completed in the 1970s.
10	Gate of Europe Tower 1		40°28′01″N 3°41′24″W	113.8 (373)	26	1996	Office	Known in Spanish as Puerta de Europa Torre I. Tallest buildings completed in Madrid in the 1990s.
11	Gate of Europe Tower 2		40°28′00″N 3°41′17″W	113.8 (373)	26	1996	Office	Known in Spanish as Puerta de Europa Torre II. Tallest buildings completed in Madrid in the 1990s.
12	Edificio España		40°25′27″N 3°42′40″W	107 (351)	26	1953	Hotel	Tallest building in Madrid from 1953 to 1957. Originally a mixed-use structure containing a hotel, apartments, offices and shops. The Spanish RIU Hotels chain acquired the building in 2017 and reopened it as a hotel in 2019.
13	Castellana 81		40°26′51″N 3°41′31″W	107 (351)	28	1981	Office	Formerly known as Torre BBVA, or BBVA Tower in English.
14	Torre Titania		40°26′49″N 3°41′40″W	103.7 (340)	23	2011	Office	Tallest building completed in Madrid in the 2010s.
15	Torre del Complejo Cuzco		40°27′30″N 3°41′21″W	100 (328)	25	1979	Office	
16	Skyline Madrid Tower 1		40°28′06″N 3°42′29″W	100 (328)	25	2022	Residential	Tallest residential buildings in Madrid.
17	Skyline Madrid Tower 2		40°28′04″N 3°42′30″W	100 (328)	25	2022	Residential	Tallest residential buildings in Madrid.
18	Torres AXA 1		40°27′52″N 3°42′21″W	100 (328)	24	2024	Residential	
19	Torres AXA 2		40°27′50″N 3°42′21″W	100 (328)	24	2024	Residential	
20	Valencia Tower		40°25′17″N 3°40′46″W	94 (308)	27	1973	Residential	
21	La Vela		40°30′04″N 3°39′52″W	92.8 (304)	19	2015	Office	
22	Hospital Central de la Defensa Gómez Ulla		40°23′22″N 3°44′51″W	89 (292)	22	1972	Hospital	
23	Telefónica Building		40°25′13″N 3°42′07″W	88.1 (289)	14	1929	Office	Tallest building in Madrid from 1929 to 1953. Tallest building completed in Madrid in the 1920s.
24	Torre Chamartín Merlin		40°29′11″N 3°40′20″W	86.5 (284)	18	2018	Office	
25	Torre Mahou		40°26′55″N 3°41′39″W	85 (279)	22	1989	Office	
26	Calle del Condado de Treviño 2		40°28′37″N 3°40′23″W	84.1 (276)	26	1980	Residential	
27	Capitán Haya 51		40°27′48″N 3°41′32″W	84 (276)	24	1973	Residential	
28	Torre Metropolitana		40°26′51″N 3°42′56″W	84 (276)	24	1978	Mixed-use	Mixed-use residential and office building.
29	Torre Gestesa Chamartin		40°29′07″N 3°40′04″W	82.6 (271)	21	2010	Residential	
30	Entrerrios Apartments		40°27′07″N 3°41′40″W	82 (269)	25	1973	Residential	
31	Torres Blancas		40°26′24″N 3°40′19″W	81 (266)	25	1968	Residential	Tallest building completed in Madrid in the 1960s.
32	Puerta de Chamartín		40°29′10″N 3°40′13″W	80.9 (265)	22	2006	Residential	
33	Calle Caleruega 50		40°28′51″N 3°40′17″W	78 (256)	22	1976	Residential	
34	Cuzco 4		40°27′35″N 3°41′26″W	78 (256)	23	1979	Office	
35	Torre Ambar		40°29′06″N 3°40′01″W	78 (256)	22	2009	Residential	
36	Torre Castilla		40°27′58″N 3°41′27″W	77 (253)	24	1981	Office	
37	Torre Australis		40°29′11″N 3°40′16″W	77 (253)	23	2020	Residential	
38	Torre Retiro		40°24′45″N 3°40′34″W	75 (246)	24	1971	Mixed-use	Mixed-use office and residential building.
39	Edificio Bronce		40°28′23″N 3°40′31″W	75 (246)	20	1990	Office	
40	Torre Panorama		40°29′09″N 3°40′10″W	75 (246)	22	2006	Residential	

=== Other structures ===
This list ranks non-inhabitable structures in Indianapolis that stand at least 75 m (246 ft) tall based on standard height measurements.

Rank	Name	Image	Location	Height m (ft)	Year	Purpose	Notes
1	Torrespaña		40°25′14″N 3°39′51″W	232 (761)	1982	Telecommunications/Observation	
2	Faro de Moncloa		40°26′14″N 3°43′18″W	110 (361)	1992	Telecommunications/Observation	
3	Caja Madrid Obelisk		40°27′58″N 3°41′22″W	93 (305)	2009	Monument	Also known as the Calatrava Obelisk after its designer, Santiago Calatrava. Located in Plaza de Castilla, it was commissioned by Caja Madrid to commemorate the 300th anniversary of its founding. It is covered with 462 movable bronze slats, but due to high maintenance costs and technical problems, its movement has been activated only a few times.

== Tallest under construction or proposed ==
=== Under construction ===
The following table includes buildings under construction in Madrid that are planned to be at least 75 m (246 ft) tall as of 2026, based on standard height measurement. The “Year” column indicates the expected year of completion. Buildings that are on hold are not included.

Name	Height m (ft)	Floors	Purpose	Year	Notes
Clesa - Oria Innovation Campus	118 (387)	28	Office	2029	
Torre Adequa - Metrovacesa	100 (328)	25	Office	2030	

=== Proposed ===
The following table includes approved and proposed buildings in Madrid that are expected to be at least 75 m (246 ft) tall as of 2026, based on standard height measurement. The “Year” column indicates the expected year of completion. A dash “–“ indicates information about the building’s height, floor count, or year of completion is unknown or has not been released.

Name	District	Height m (ft)	Floors	Purpose	Year	Notes
Torre Madrid Nuevo Norte 1	Fuencarral-El Pardo	330 (1,080)	77	Office	2030	
Torre Madrid Nuevo Norte 2	Fuencarral-El Pardo	265 (869)	–	Office	2030	
Torre Chamartín I	Fuencarral-El Pardo	250 (820)	54	Office	2030	
Torre Madrid Nuevo Norte 3	Fuencarral-El Pardo	240 (790)	–	Office	2030	
Torre Chamartín II	Fuencarral-El Pardo	190 (620)	42	Office	2030	
Torre Madrid Nuevo Norte 4	Fuencarral-El Pardo	180 (590)	–	Office	2030	
Torre Metropolitan	Chamberí	130 (430)	31	Residential	–	

== Tallest demolished ==
There has been one building that once stood taller than 75 m (246 ft) in Madrid and has since been demolished.

Name	Image	Height m (ft)	Floors	Year completed	Year demolished	Purpose	Notes
Windsor Tower		103.9 (341)	32	1979	2005	Office	Known as Edificio Windsor or Torre Windsor in Spanish. The building was gutted by a fire on 12 February 2005. The rest of the building was demolished from March to August later that year. Torre Titania was later built on the site of the former building from 2007 to 2011, at nearly the same height.

== Timeline of tallest buildings ==
This lists buildings that once held the title of the tallest building in Madrid.

Name	Image	District	Years as tallest	Height m (ft)	Floors	Notes
Edificio Metrópolis		Centro	1910–1919	45 (148)	5	
Cybele Palace		Centro	1919–1929	70 (230)	8	
Edificio Telefónica		Centro	1929–1953	88 (289)	14	
Edificio España		Centro	1953–1957	117 (384)	25	
Torre de Madrid		Moncloa-Aravaca	1957–1989	142 (466)	34	
Torre Picasso		Tetuán	1989–2008	156.4 (513)	43	
Torre de Cristal		Fuencarral-El Pardo	2008–present	249 (817)	50	

== Sources and external links ==
- Report for Madrid at Emporis
- Report for Madrid at SkyscraperPage
- Report for Madrid at Structurae
