= Caleido =

Skyscraper in Madrid

Coordinates: 40°28′40″N 3°41′20″W

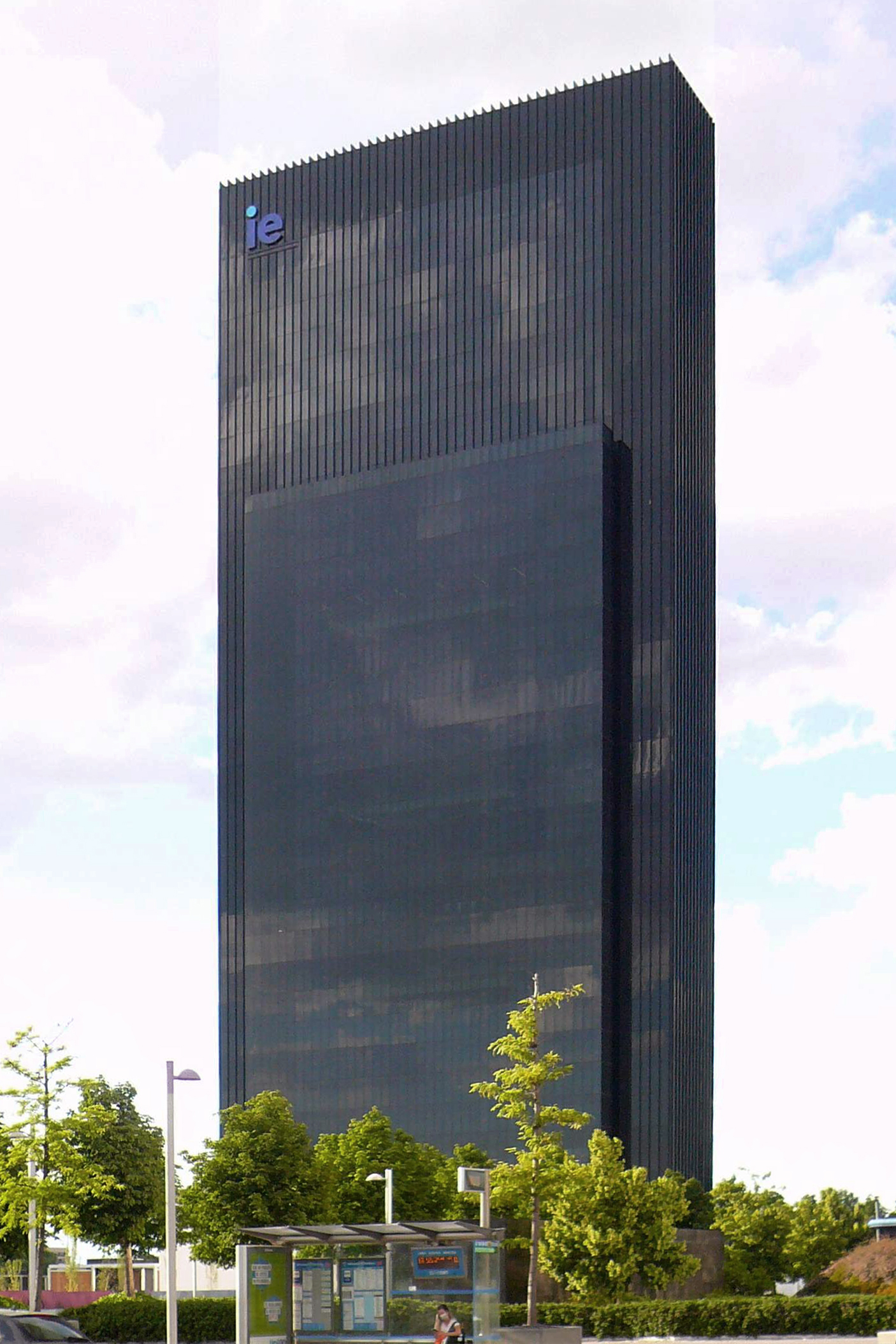
- Caleido in June 2021
- Interactive map of the Caleido area
- Etymology: καλός (kalós), beautiful, and εἶδος (éidos), image

General information
- Status: Completed
- Location: Paseo de la Castellana, 259-E, Madrid, Spain
- Construction started: April 2017
- Completed: 19 October 2021 (age 4)
- Cost: 240 million €
- Owner: Grupo Villar Mir; Emperador Properties

Height
- Architectural: 173 meters (568 ft)

Technical details
- Floor count: 36
- Floor area: 70,000 m^{2} (750,000 sq ft)
- Grounds: 33,325 m^{2} (358,710 sq ft)

Design and construction
- Architecture firm: Fenwick Iribarren; Serrano-Suñer Arquitectura
- Developer: Obrascón Huarte Lain

Website
- Official website

Caleido is a 173-metre-tall (568 ft), 36-story skyscraper located in Madrid. It is popularly known as the Quinta Torre (Fifth Tower), as it stands near the other four skyscrapers of the Cuatro Torres Business Area (CTBA) complex along the Paseo de la Castellana. As of 2021, IE University is the main tenant.

Construction began in April 2017 and the tower was formally completed on 19 October 2021. The original completion date was September 2020, but it was delayed due to the COVID-19 pandemic.

The building occupies the former site of the Centro Internacional de Convenciones de la Ciudad de Madrid. It is the fifth tallest building in Madrid and the eighth tallest in Spain.

Caleido was designed by the architectural firms Fenwick Iribarren and Serrano-Suñer Arquitectura. The main contractor was OHL Desarrollos.

== History ==
On the land where the four CTBA towers now stand was the former Ciudad Deportiva de Real Madrid, which was demolished in 2004. Between 2004 and 2009, the Torre Cepsa, Torre de Cristal, Torre Emperador Castellana and Torre PwC were built in the area bordering Paseo de la Castellana. However, there remained another part, close to Avenida Monforte de Lemos, with 33,325 m^{2} (358,710 sq ft) of surface area and 70,000 m^{2} (750,000 sq ft) of buildable area.

=== Initial idea ===
Originally, the new Madrid International Convention Centre (CICCM) was to be built with a budget of 300 million euros. The foundation stone was laid in 2008, two months after the bankruptcy of Lehman Brothers. In 2009, the underground construction was awarded in a public tender to FCC Group and Acciona for a total of 72 million euros. In 2010, it was decided that only this preliminary phase would be undertaken and construction would be halted pending better times, as a shock plan by the Madrid City Council under Alberto Ruiz-Gallardón to control spending in the midst of the economic crisis. The project was paralyzed for several years, leaving a plot of land with the hole made for the foundation, with the problem that the containment and safety works, based on fitting screens and anchors, had a useful life of two years. A total of 110 million were invested without anything having been built on the site.

Various options were subsequently considered, such as the construction of a car park or an Olympic sports complex, when Madrid's Olympic aspirations were still in place.

=== Villar Mar enters the game ===
At the end of 2014, it was decided to look for an alternative plan: to put the land up for auction under a concession. In March, Ana Botella's government, two months before being replaced by Manuela Carmena, received a total of four bids, with the Villar Mir Group winning the award process. For the concession, which grants the right to use the land for a period of 75 years, the group that owns the construction company OHL and the real estate company Espacio would pay an annual fee of 4 million euros. The city council requested that the successful bidder pay at least an annual fee of 1.94 million euros. In addition, Madrid City Council required that approximately 53,000 m² of the 70,000 available m² be used for public purposes. The remainder, approximately 17,500 m², should be used as a commercial area. The public use was to consist of the construction of a private hospital.

In September 2015, it was announced that the Villar Mir Group had formed a joint venture with the Swiss fund Corestate Capital to build the skyscraper at an expected cost of 240 million. The American hospital group Mount Sinai considered setting up in Madrid, but ruled it out because it considered the rental costs to be excessive. Negotiations were soon initiated with the Quirón Group, as well as with other hospital groups.

In January 2016, an agreement was reached with the Instituto de Empresa (IE), which would occupy the majority of the property. In March 2016, the agreement was finally confirmed, and IE University is set to open in autumn 2019. IE has signed a 20-year lease agreement, renewable up to a maximum of 55 years. The site would feature a clinic, a shopping centre and parking for 2,000 vehicles, as well as gardens and leisure areas. The clinic, belonging to the Quirón Group, would also house a High Performance Centre and would occupy a total of 10,000 m².

=== Obtaining of the license and official presentation ===
Between June and July 2016, the details of the documentation were finalized and finally submitted on August 1 of that same year to the Madrid City Council for the granting of the construction license. In November 2016, Corestate and Villar Mir broke off their joint venture by mutual agreement due to "the differences that have arisen in the real estate strategy of the partners"; but this would not affect the Quinta Torre project. On 10 January 2017, the project was officially presented by the Espacio Real Estate Company (Villar Mir Group) and with the attendance of the Mayor of Madrid, Manuela Carmena, and the president of OHL, Juan Miguel Villar Mir. The tower was finally named Caleido, a name of Greek origin formed by καλός (kalós), "beautiful", and εἶδος (éidos), "image".

The Quirón health center, in addition to general medicine, was to focus on sports, disease prevention and well-being. The project, including fees and charges, exceeded 300 million euros, and was expected to generate more than 2,400 jobs. On 16 March 2017, Grupo Villar Mir sold 49% of the tower to the real estate company Megaworld Corporation, a Philippine multinational owned by businessman Andrew Tan. Tan, through his company, Grupo Emperador, acquired Torre Espacio in November 2015.

=== Construction ===
Between April and December 2017, the demolition and preparation of the existing floor slabs on the site, as well as the demolition of the base and foundation, were carried out. That same month, the third phase of the project, the construction of the structure, began. At the beginning of 2018, it was anticipated that construction would be completed in February 2019 and the complex would be inaugurated in the third quarter of 2020. However, due to the effects of the COVID-19 pandemic in Spain, its opening has been postponed to 2021. The bidding process, in which three invited companies participated, was awarded on 19 February 2018—as expected—to the OHL Group, whose main shareholder is the project's developer: the Villar Mir Group. OHL was also awarded the first two phases of the project.

=== Inauguration ===
In September 2021, a small park bordering Avenida de Monforte de Lemos to the west of the main building was inaugurated. On 19 October 2021, the building was officially inaugurated with visits from dignitaries such as King Felipe VI of Spain and the Mayor of Madrid, José Luis Martínez-Almeida. The Quirónsalud sports medicine center opened in the second half of June 2022, and the shopping area opened at the end of September of the same year.

== See also ==
- List of tallest buildings in Madrid
