= Vallehermoso =

Vallehermoso can mean:

- Vallehermoso, Negros Oriental, a municipality in the Philippines
- Vallehermoso, Santa Cruz de Tenerife, a municipality on Canary Island
- Vallehermoso (Madrid), a ward of Chamberi district, Madrid, Spain
- Estadio de Vallehermoso, a multi-use stadium in Madrid, Spain
- Torre PwC (formerly Torre Sacyr Vallehermoso), a skyscraper in Madrid, Spain
- Sacyr Vallehermoso, a Spanish construction company

== See also ==
- Valle Hermoso (disambiguation)
