= Skyline Madrid =

Housing estate in Madrid, Spain

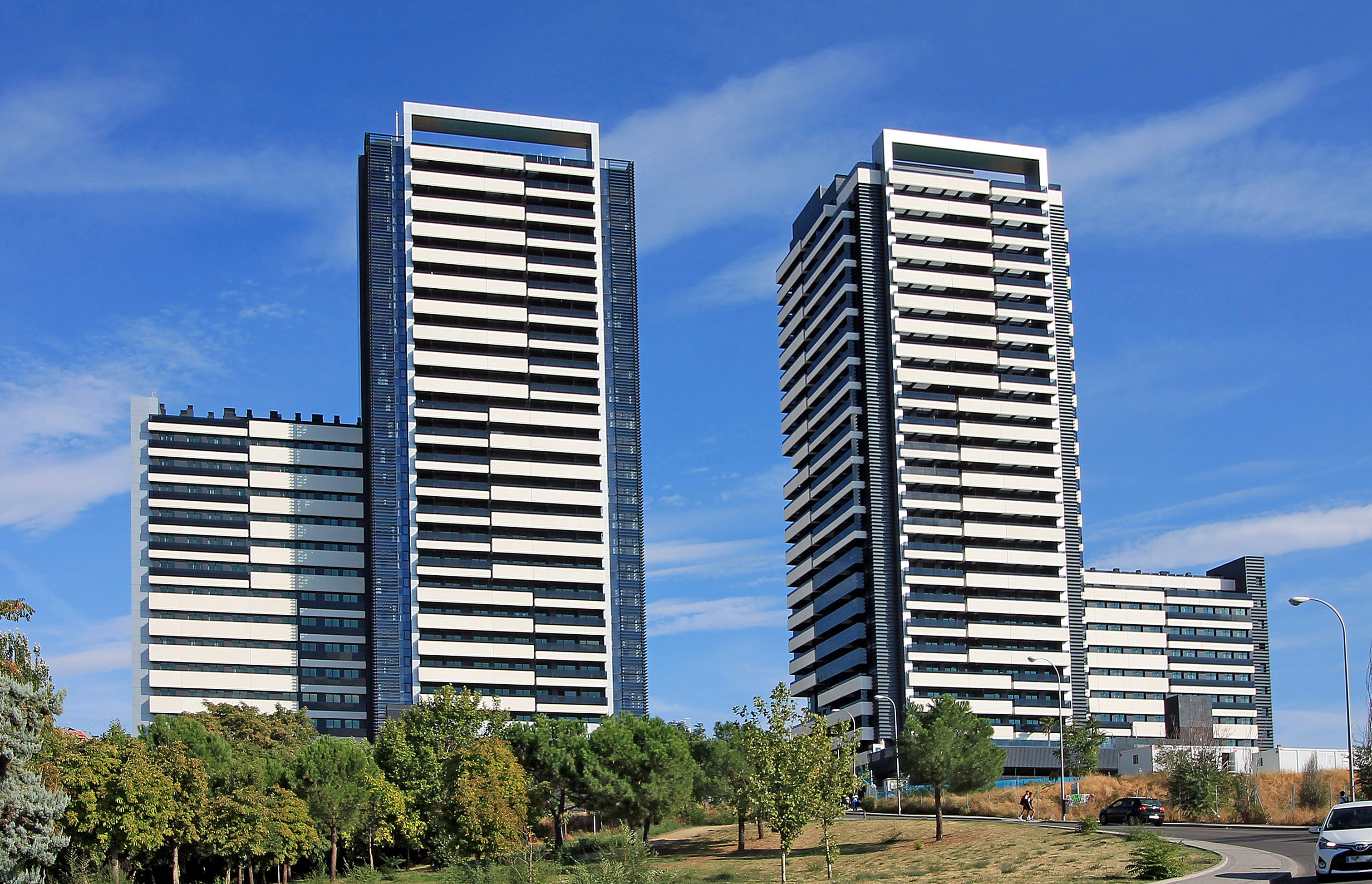
- View from the west
- Interactive map of the Skyline Madrid area

General information
- Status: Completed
- Type: Residential
- Architectural style: Contemporary
- Location: Paseo de la Dirección 161-246, Tetuán, Madrid, Spain
- Coordinates: 40°28′6.4″N 3°42′29.2″W
- Construction started: 2020
- Completed: 2022
- Opening: 18 October 2022
- Cost: €200 million
- Owner: Stoneweg Spain S.L.
- Operator: CBRE Real Estate S.A. Bext Space

Height
- Roof: 100 m (330 ft)

Technical details
- Floor count: 25

Design and construction
- Architect: Julio Touza Rodríguez
- Architecture firm: Touza Arquitectos
- Main contractor: Dragados S.A.

Other information
- Number of units: 600

Website
- skyline-madrid.com

Skyline Madrid, also known as the Skyline Towers (Spanish: Torres Skyline) or simply Skyline, is a luxury housing estate along the Paseo de la Dirección in Madrid, Spain. The development consists of a pair of 100-metre (330 ft) twin towers along with two smaller buildings, featuring a mix of apartments both for rent and for sale along with several amenities.

Located facing the Parque Agustín Rodríguez Sahagún in the Valdeacederas neighborhood of Tetuán, it is one of the most expensive housing developments of its kind in Spain.

== History ==
Planning for what would become Skyline Madrid dates back to 1997, when the Madrid city government created a plan to redevelop the Paseo de la Dirección corridor after a similar plan was made for the area around the Avenida de Asturias, which was expropriated by the government of the Community of Madrid in the late 1980s.

In 2005, the Madrid city government announced the redevelopment of several tracts of land along the Paseo de la Dirección, involving the construction of some 1,700 new apartment units. Development would proceed slowly for the next several years, one the one hand due to opposing approaches to how the land should be developed between the project's original developer, the People's Party-led conservative mayorships of Alberto Ruiz-Gallardón and Ana Botella which led the initial planning process, and the succeeding Más Madrid-led progressive administration of Manuela Carmena, and on the other due to resistance from affected residents whose properties were to be expropriated for the project.

Stoneweg, a Swiss real estate development company and investment fund, purchased the land on which Skyline would be built from Dragados, the company developing the properties around the corridor, in December 2018, paying some €120 million for a 45,000-square-metre (480,000 sq ft) plot of land. The purchase is the most expensive land transaction in the city's history.

Preparatory construction work began in November 2019, with actual construction beginning in February 2020. During construction, Stoneweg had attempted to sell the development to another developer for some €375 million but decided to cancel the sale prior to the development's completion. Construction was completed in 2022, and Skyline was inaugurated on October 18, 2022. Stoneweg was able to sell 95% of units available for sale prior to the development being completed, but was less successful in attracting tenants to units for rent.

On 3 May 2023, two people were injured in a brawl that took place in the development, one of whom was seriously injured after being slashed in the throat with a knife.

== Structure and amenities ==
Skyline Madrid consists of two identical 100-metre (330 ft) towers with each tower containing 25 stories, of which 24 in each tower are habitable. The entire development has some 600 apartments, with 300 units consisting of one-, two- and three-bedroom units available per building. On top of one of the buildings is an infinity pool, while another swimming pool is also found on the first floor, alongside gardens with views of the Cuatro Torres Business Area.

Several hotel-like amenities are found throughout the development, including a receptionist, a messaging service, a gym with personal trainers, and catering services. Many of the units at both buildings also include a balcony.

== Reception ==
Skyline was successful in attracting moneyed interests to the development, with football players, successful artists and even some of Spain's wealthiest people investing in units. A number of units sold have even been counted as being among the most expensive property transactions in Madrid, with one penthouse apartment selling for €1.2 million despite the impact of the COVID-19 pandemic on the country's property market.

Despite its success, the project has been criticized for contributing to gentrification in Tetuán, a historically working-class district. Some residents of Valdeacederas have complained that the development's residents aren't integrated into neighborhood life, and both rents and property sale prices at Skyline are significantly higher than average prices in the rest of Tetuán. Many of those displaced by the project were compensated at below-market rates and could not afford to buy homes in other parts of the city, and the project has been criticized for blocking the views of neighboring buildings and contributing to visual pollution, with the development's residents, who are wealthier and largely new to the neighborhood, being given a monopoly on picturesque views of the city to the detriment of their more established working-class neighbors.

== See also ==
- List of tallest buildings in Spain
