= Valle Hermoso =

Valle Hermoso may refer to:

- Argentina: Valle Hermoso, Córdoba
- Chile: Valle Hermoso, Valparaíso
- Mexico: Valle Hermoso, Tamaulipas
- United States: Valle Hermoso, Texas

== See also ==
- Vallehermoso (disambiguation)
