= Madrid Nuevo Norte =

Urban redevelopment programme in Madrid, Spain

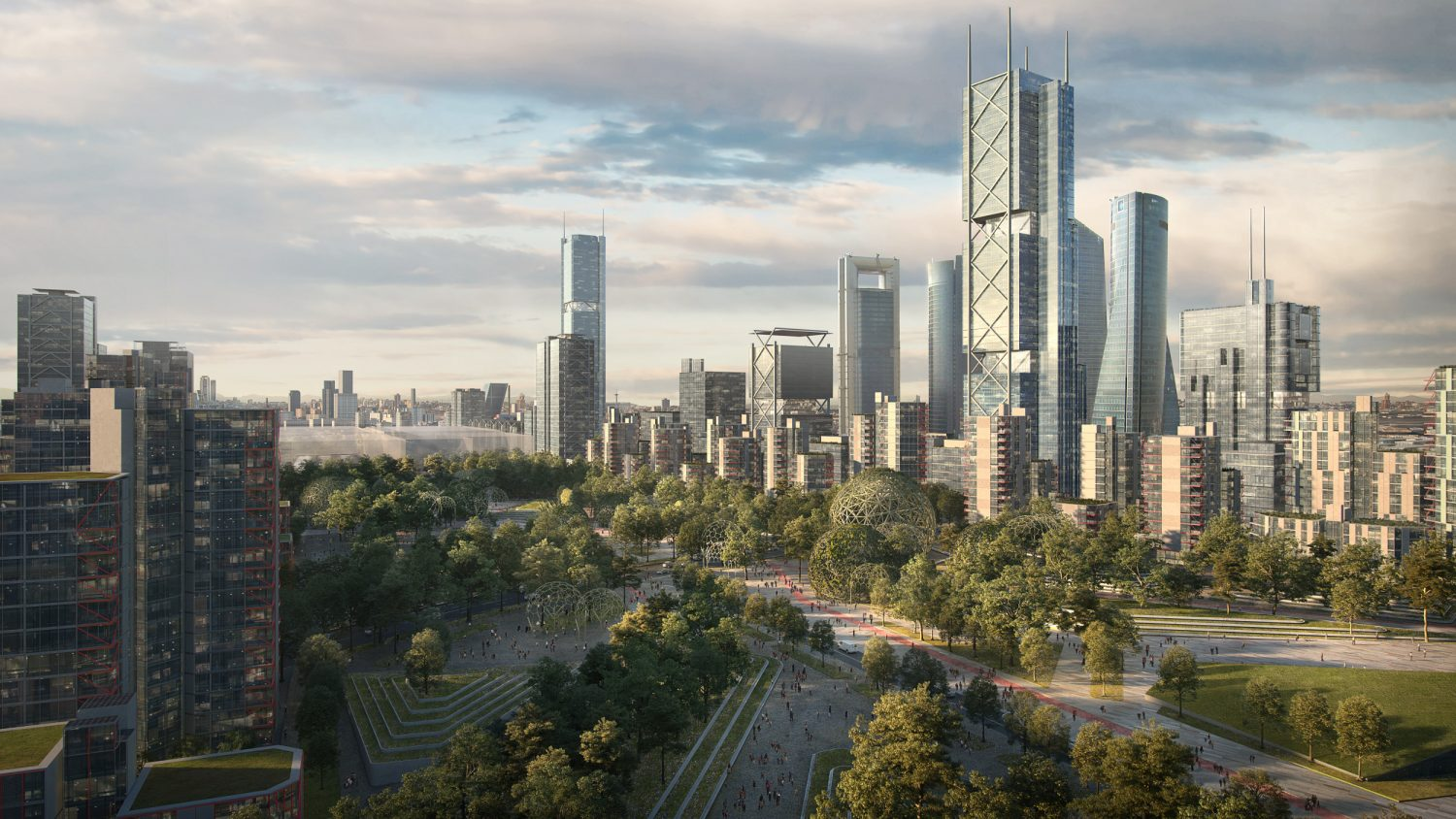
A graphical representation of the projected future appearance of the area

Madrid Nuevo Norte (Madrid New North), previously known as Operación Chamartín, is an urban redevelopment programme in the Spanish capital city of Madrid, managed and promoted by the privately owned company Distrito Castellana Norte. (Note: The term Distrito Castellana Norte is also occasionally used to refer to the project itself; the official name since 2017 corresponds to the article title.) After decades-long administrative struggle, construction works started in 2026 and may only be completed by 2045. If executed in its entirety following current plans, the project will reshape 2.65 million square metres of land and create an estimated 241,700 new jobs.

== Timeline ==
The project was first conceived in 1993 by state-owned rail transport enterprise Renfe and the Ministry of Development, at the time primarily as an extension to Chamartín railway station with subsequent rearrangement of the adjacent neighbourhoods. However, the project soon faced its first serious obstacles, as landowners fought their expropriation in court, a legal process that would ultimately take 15 years to be definitively concluded.

The programme's realization was further impeded when in 2004, tragedy struck in the form of the Madrid train bombings. Coincidentally, the attack took place on the exact same day the initial phase of the then-Operación Chamartín was to be approved, with an event of this magnitude being cited as the only eventuality that could have delayed this approval. The political fallout of the attack upended the former government's majority, with the new government under José Luis Rodríguez Zapatero proceeding to renegotiate key aspects of the plans. These talks once more lasted for several years, and when the Zapatero-led government and DUCH (Note: Desarrollos Urbanísticos de Chamartín; the predecessor of Distrito Castellana Norte.) arrived at a partial compromise in December 2008, the Great Recession following the 2008 financial crisis had already affected the Spanish banking and real estate sectors. Another attempt at starting the project, initiated by the municipal government of mayor Alberto Ruiz-Gallardón, was shot down by the High Court of Madrid in 2013.

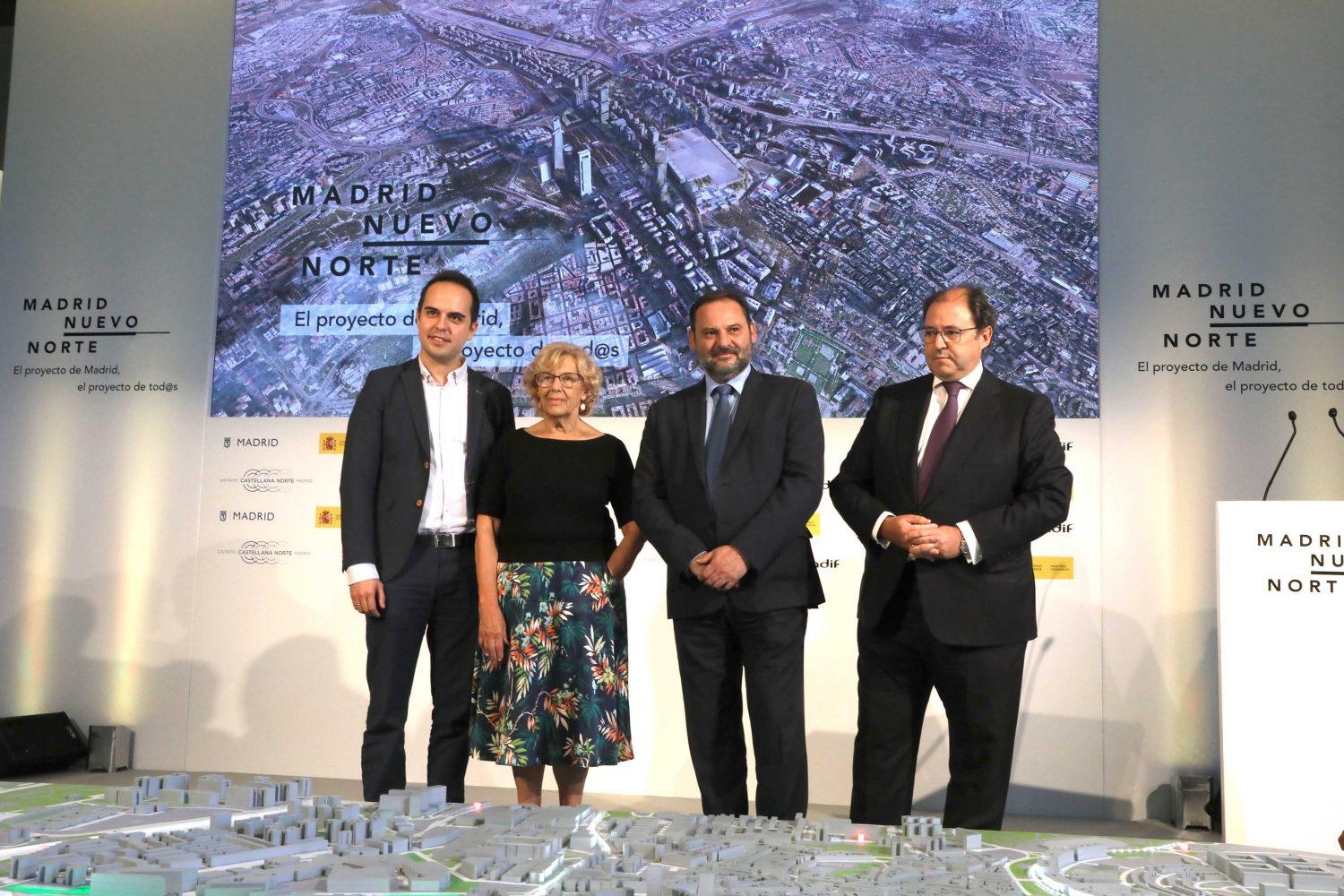
Mayor Manuela Carmena (2015–19) with José Luis Ábalos, Antonio Béjar, and José Manuel Calvo during the presentation of the final draft of the project in July 2018

After Manuela Carmena had won the municipal election in 2015, the project was rethought. Tensions arose between the new mayor and a number of commercial partners like the bank BBVA, as the former insisted on adding more residential apartments and green spaces to the plans and would have rather kept the involvement of private contributors to a minimum, for a time promoting an alternative proposal which would have been significantly less ambitious, but also cheaper and faster to realize. However, as this iteration of the plan was rejected by both participating enterprises and legislative bodies, the involved parties ultimately came to a compromise that, while incorporating many of the proposed changes, remained largely faithful to the project's previously intended physical scope, with its name being changed to Madrid Nuevo Norte. A notable exception to this was the northward extension of the Paseo de la Castellana, which was scrapped from the plans.

On 29 July 2019, the new project was approved, receiving unanimous support from all parties represented in the Madrilenian townhall. With another round of mostly minor revisions to be implemented, the regional government under Isabel Díaz Ayuso on their part approved it on 20 March 2020, with construction works set to begin in early 2021 as of July.

In July 2020, the project was registered with both LEED and BREEAM, two notable certification programmes related to sustainability in urban planning. If successful, Madrid Nuevo Norte would become the first Spanish project to obtain either certification.

== Scope of the project ==
Madrid Nuevo Norte stipulates the creation of 348 new office buildings and 11,700 apartments. Additionally, the skyline of the northern city's business district, which is currently still dominated by the Cuatro Torres, will receive at least three more skyscrapers at a height of 190 to more than 250 metres. At a proposed height of approximately 330 metres, the highest of these buildings would become the tallest building in the European Union upon completion.

In terms of public transport, the plans include a short additional metro line consisting of three stations, in conjunction with a novel priority bus line. A new Cercanías station is also to be constructed, most likely above the northernmost of the metro stations. Chamartín railway station will be significantly extended and modernized, turning it once more into the main reference point of the Spanish high velocity rail network AVE (which is currently thought to be Atocha in the south of Madrid).

== Reactions ==
Common criticisms of the project have historically often focused on it having the potential to further increase already existing income disparities within the city proper, with southern districts like Villaverde and Usera being significantly less wealthy than their central and northern counterparts. Eduardo Mangada, an architect and former PCE and PSOE municipal councillor in charge of urban planning responsibilities, criticized the programme for being a private venture rather than a public one, polemically calling for it to be renamed "Cortijo BBVA" (BBVA's farmhouse).

Echoing a chorus of more positive domestic and international voices, German business newspaper Handelsblatt has called the project a "key economic stimulus", citing a poll indicating overwhelming popular support for the project among Madrilenians. Architect and urban planner José María Ezquiaga argued that the redevelopment of already existing areas represents the only viable alternative to a continuing trend of urban dispersion, pointing out similarities to other European projects. He also called for the "anchoring" of the newly developed terrain to the Paseo de la Castellana, referring to the street as the "backbone" of Madrid's city structure. Lorena Vargas of T: The New York Times Style Magazine described it as an essential step to help Madrid catch up to other major European capitals like London or Paris.

== See also ==
- List of megaprojects
- List of tallest buildings in Vienna
