= Gómez Ulla Military Hospital =

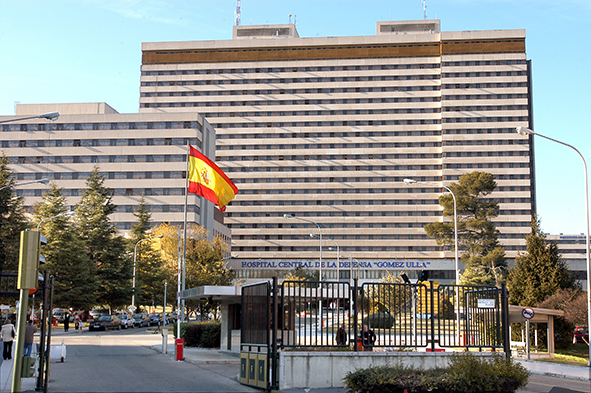
- View of the hospital

Geography
- Location: Madrid, Spain
- Coordinates: 40°23′16″N 3°44′42″W

Organisation
- Affiliated university: University of Alcalá

Services
- Beds: 520

History
- Founded: 1896

The Gómez Ulla Military Hospital (Spanish: Hospital Militar Gómez Ulla), presently known officially as Hospital Central de la Defensa Gómez Ulla, is a military hospital in Madrid, located in the Aluche area in the former Carabanchel quarter of the city. It is part of the Spanish Ministry of Defence.

== History ==
The hospital was founded on 21 April 1896 as the Hospital de Carabanchel and soon became a background for the dramatic historical events of 20th century Spain.

At the time of the Rif War it filled with wounded military personnel which had been transferred from Morocco and the hospital was renamed in honor of Mariano Gómez Ulla, a Spanish military surgeon who had distinguished himself for his medical services in the battlefronts of the wars in North Africa.

During the Spanish Civil War the hospital provided services for the wounded of the Spanish Republican Armed Forces and the International Brigades, including the American Lincoln Battalion, as well as the civil victims of the aerial bombardment of the city by the Condor Legion in the course of the Siege of Madrid.

== See also ==
- American Medical Bureau
- List of tallest buildings in Madrid
