= Cuatro Torres Business Area =

- Área de Negocios de las Cuatro Torres
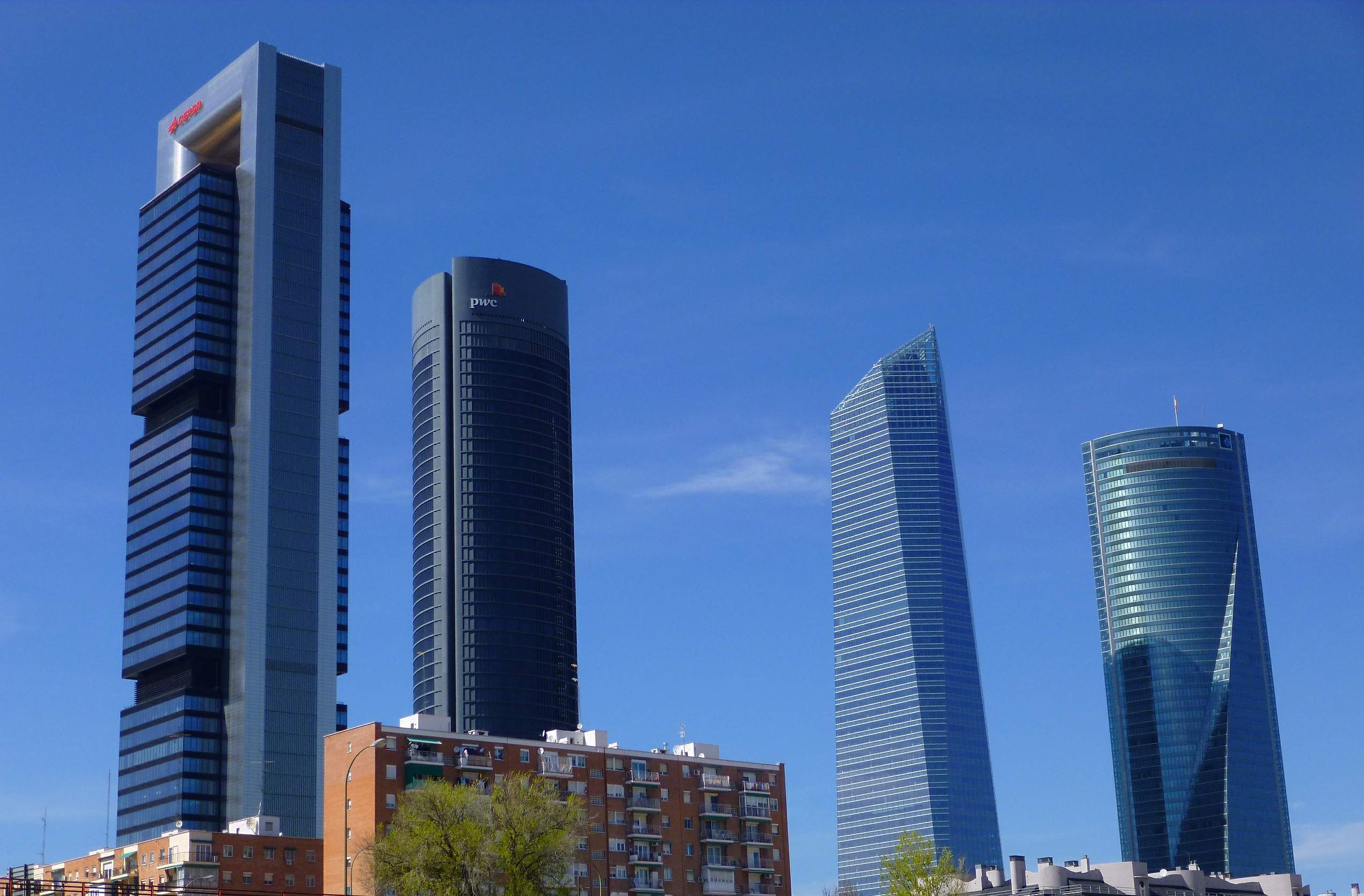
- From left to right: Torre Cepsa, Torre PwC, Torre de Cristal and Torre Espacio
- Interactive map of the Cuatro Torres Business Area area

General information
- Status: Completed
- Type: Office & Hotel (Torre PwC)
- Location: Madrid, Comunidad de Madrid, Spain
- Coordinates: 40°28′40″N 3°41′16″W
- Construction started: 2004 (all)
- Completed: Torre Espacio : March 2007; Torre PwC: April 2008; Torre Cepsa: May 2009; Torre de Cristal: December 2009

Height
- Roof: Torre de Cristal: 249 m (817 ft); Torre Bankia: 248 m (814 ft); Torre PwC: 236 m (774 ft); Torre Espacio: 230 m (750 ft)

Technical details
- Floor count: Torre PwC: 58; Torre Espacio: 57; Torre de Cristal: 52; Torre Cepsa: 45
- Lifts/elevators: Torre de Cristal: 27; Torre Espacio: 27; Torre Cepsa: 14; Torre PwC: 8

Design and construction
- Architects: Torre Cepsa: Norman Foster; Torre de Cristal: César Pelli; Torre PwC: Carlos Rubio Carvajal and Enrique Álvarez-Sala Walther; Torre Espacio: Henry N. Cobb

The Cuatro Torres Business Area (CTBA), also known as the Área de Negocios de las Cuatro Torres (Spanish for "Four Towers Business Area"), is a business district located in the Paseo de la Castellana in Madrid, Spain, on the former Ciudad Deportiva of Real Madrid. The area contains the four tallest skyscrapers in Spain, and four of the ten tallest in the European Union: the Torre Emperador, Torre de Cristal, Torre PwC and Torre Cepsa. Construction of the buildings finished in 2008.

Since the site was initially developed, a fifth tower, Caleido, was completed in 2021.

== CTBA buildings ==
Building	Year Finished	Height	Floors
Torre de Cristal	2008	249m	52
Torre Bankia	2009	248m	45
Torre PwC	2008	236m	58
Torre Espacio	2007	224m	57
Torre Caleido	2021	181m	36

=== Torre de Cristal ===
Designed by Cesar Pelli and built by Dragados, Torre de Cristal (Spanish for Crystal Tower), with a height of 249 meters, is the tallest building in the country. In April 2007, its structure surpassed the height of Torre Espacio.

=== Torre Cepsa ===
Designed by Lord Foster, and built by a joint venture of Dragados and Fomento de Construcciones y Contratas, the 45-storey Torre Cepsa (Spanish for Cepsa Tower), with a height of 248 m, is the second tallest building in the area, surpassed by Torre de Cristal by 1 meter.

It was first known as Torre Repsol and was to have served as headquarters for the oil and gas company Repsol YPF. During the construction of the tower, Repsol decided to change the location of its future headquarters, and the financial institution Caja Madrid (currently Bankia) purchased the building for €815 million in August 2007. In 2015 it was loaned to Cepsa for its main headquarters and hence the tower was renamed again as Torre Cepsa.

=== Torre PwC ===
Designed by Carlos Rubio Carvajal and Enrique Álvarez-Sala Walter and built by Sacyr Sau, the 52-storey skyscraper, formerly known as Torre Sacyr Vallehermoso, is 236 meters (774 feet) tall. It houses the five-star hotel Eurostars Madrid Tower, which occupies 60% of the tower, with rooms between floors 6 and 27 and at its upper part, a two-storey dining room offering a panoramic view of the city. It is the only tower with double skin facade and it is covered entirely of glass in the form of flakes. On the upper deck there are 3 wind turbines capable of producing wind energy for use in the building. A production of 25 kWh is estimated.

=== Torre Espacio ===
Designed by Henry N. Cobb and built by Obrascón Huarte Lain, the 57-storey Torre Espacio (Spanish for Space Tower) is 224.5 metres (737 feet) tall. In November 2006, its height surpassed that of the Gran Hotel Bali, thus making it the tallest building in Spain, although it retained that title only for a short time (see above). The structure was topped out on March 19, 2007 and that evening, Alberto Ruiz Gallardón, mayor of Madrid, attended a firework display to commemorate the event.

== Gallery ==
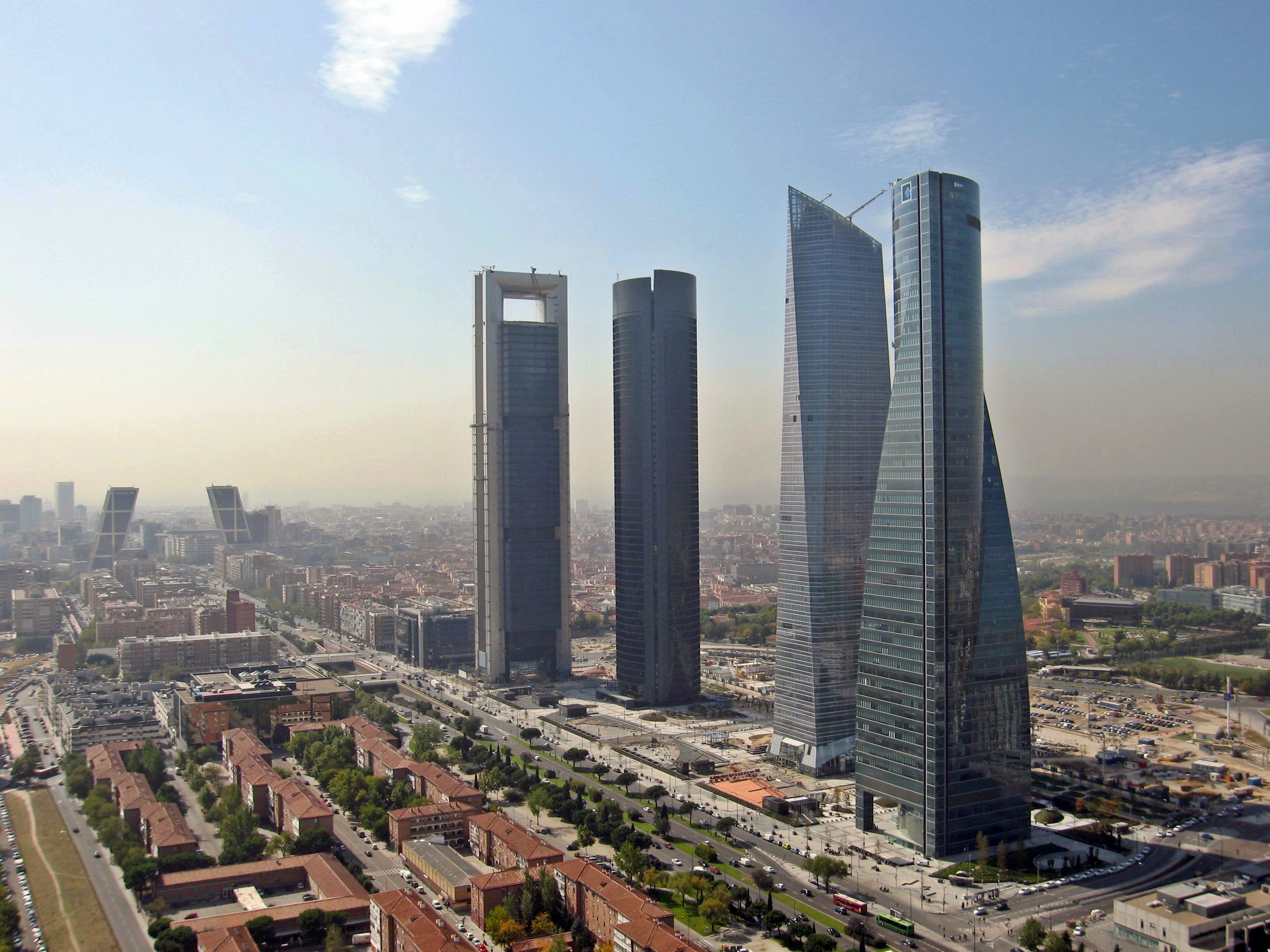
The CTBA featuring Madrid in the back

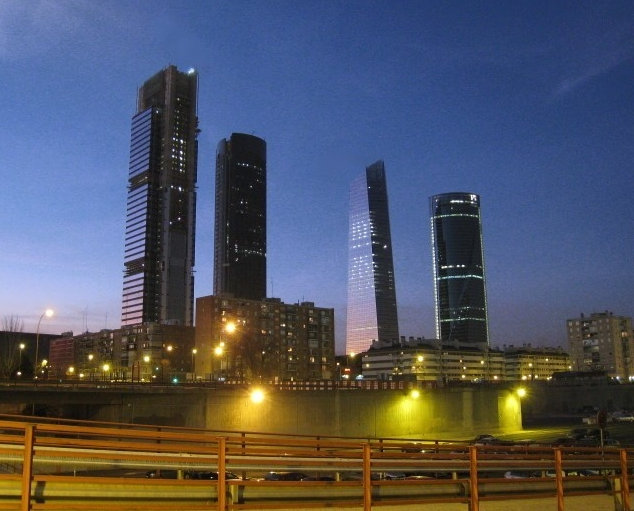
CTBA during its construction, in 2008

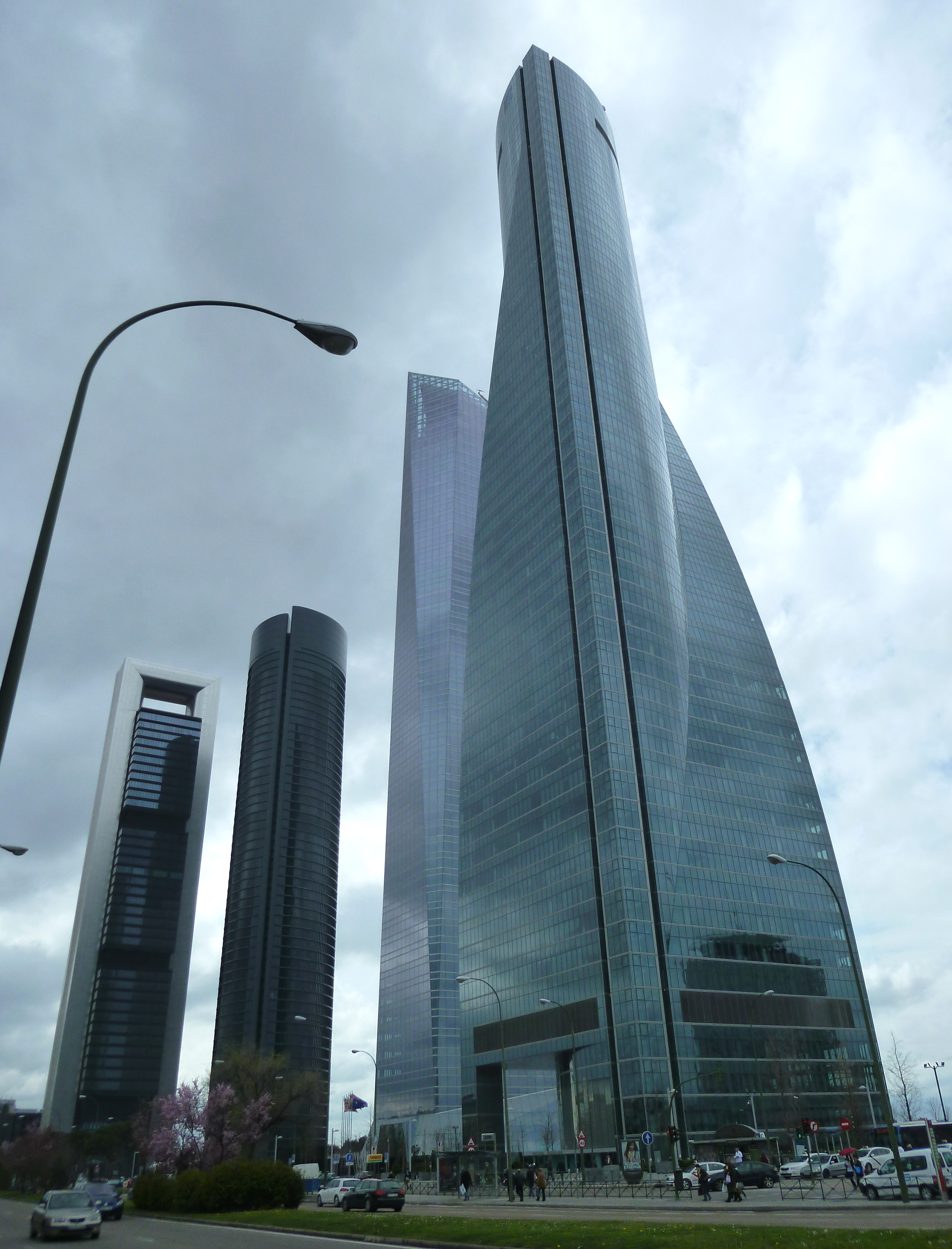
CTBA complex

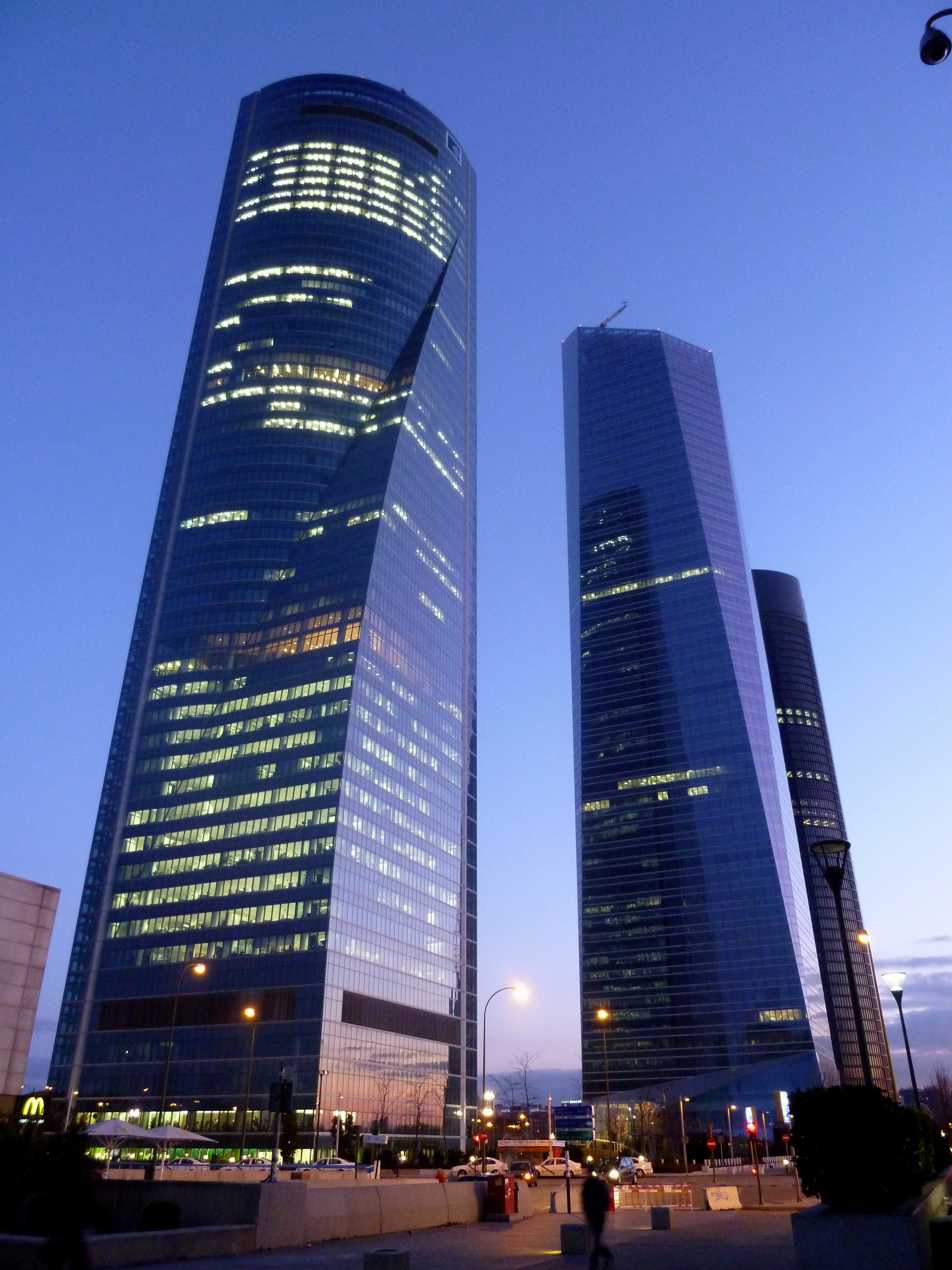
Torre de Cristal & Torre Espacio, CTBA

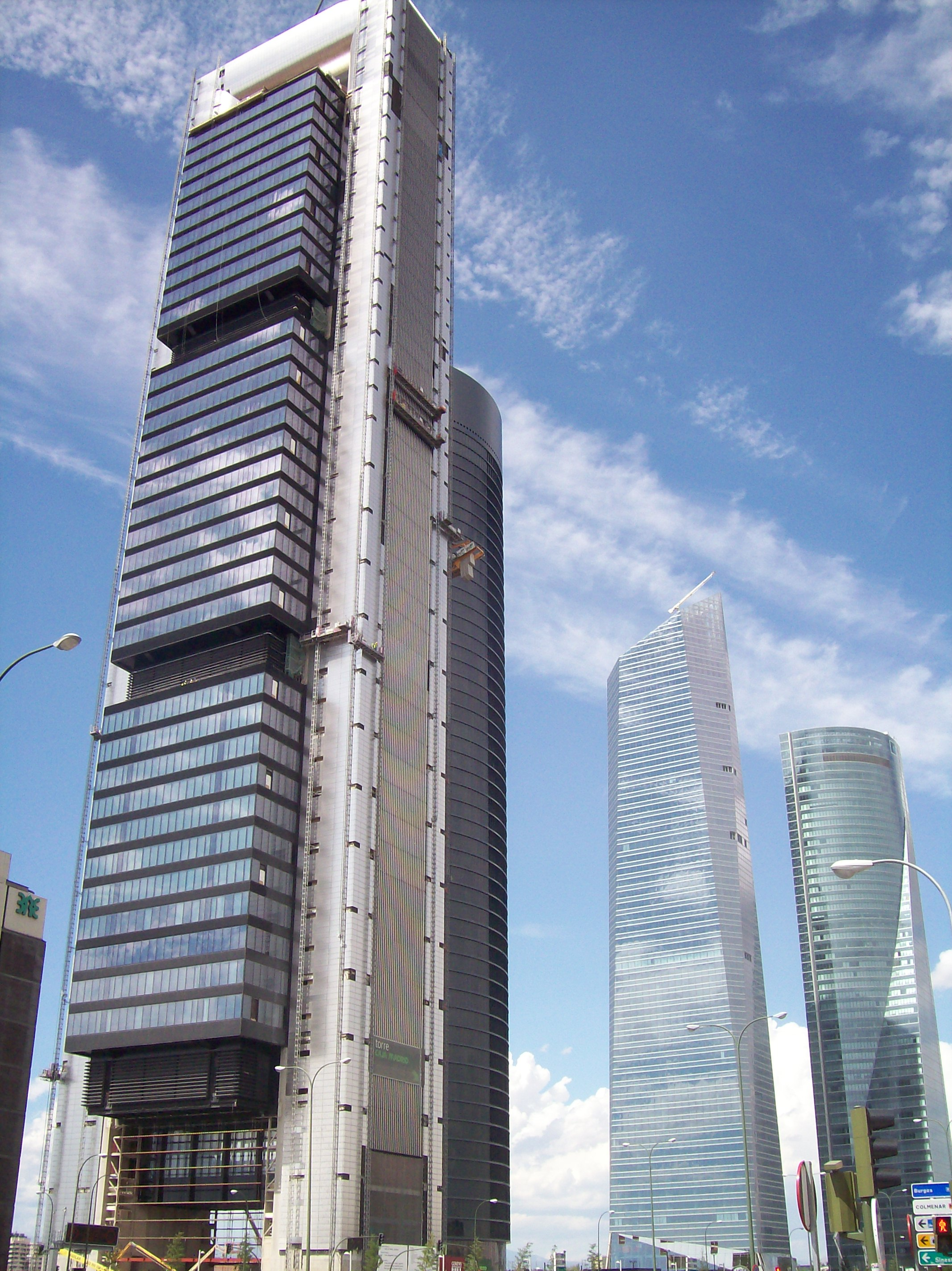
Torre Cepsa, August 2008

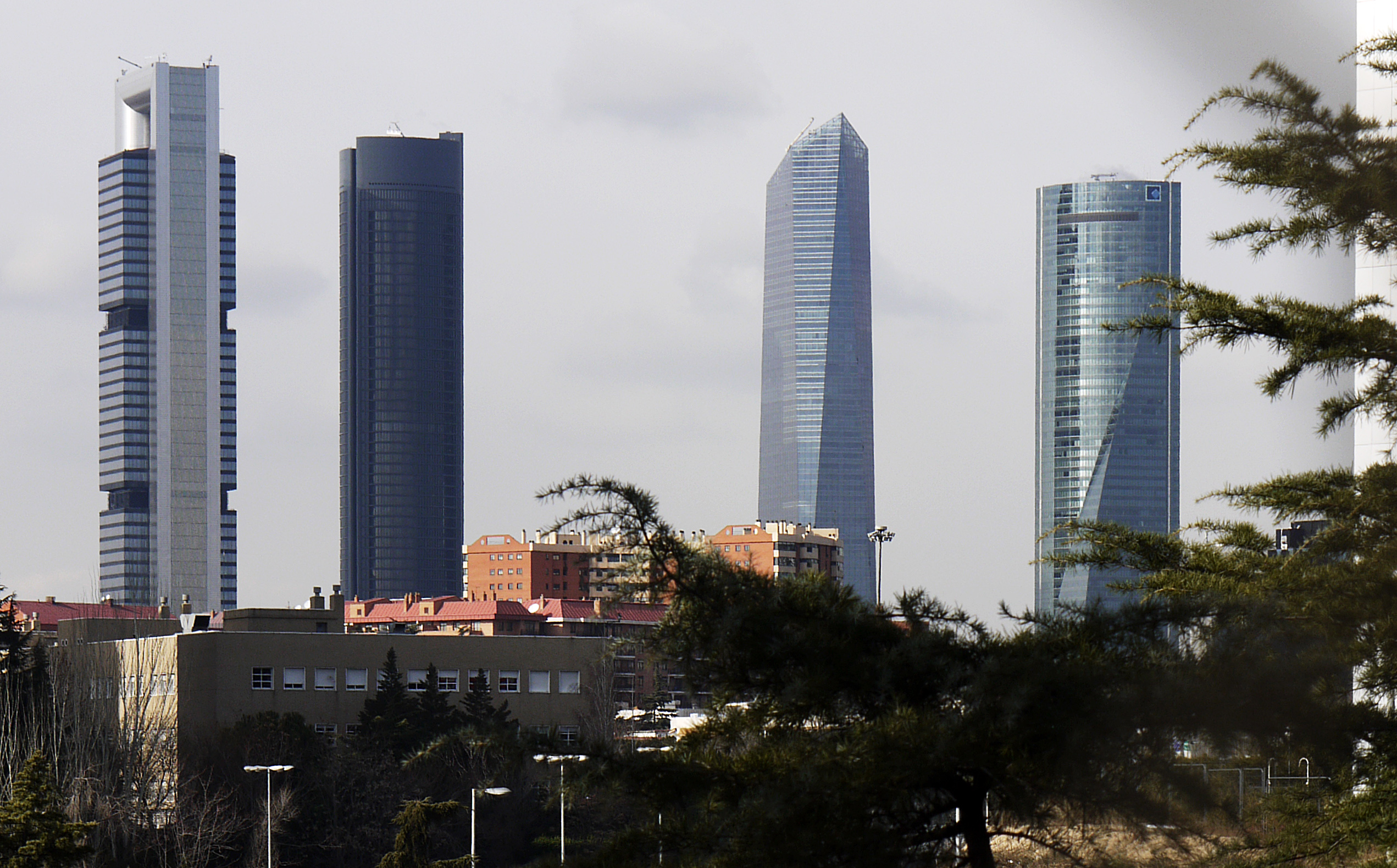
CTBA on 8 January 2009

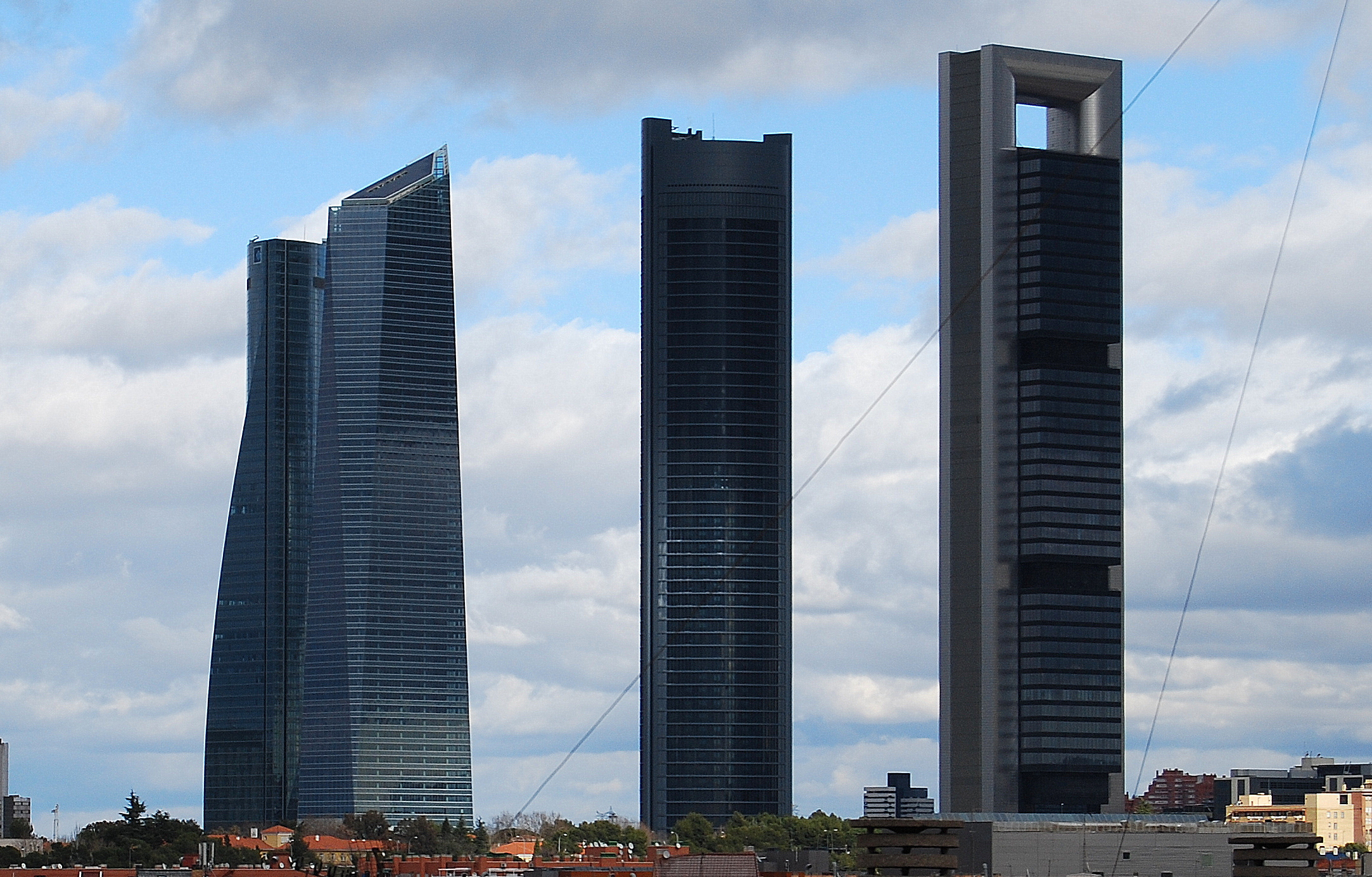
From Tetuán-Valdeacederas

== See also ==
- AZCA
- List of tallest buildings in Madrid
