= Ciudad Deportiva, Madrid =

Former sports venue in Spain

Coordinates: 40°28′39″N 3°41′17″W

Ciudad Deportiva was Real Madrid's former training complex located on the Paseo de la Castellana in Madrid, Spain.

== Real Madrid ==
Completed under the presidency of Santiago Bernabéu Yeste in 1963, the Ciudad Deportiva was a novel concept at the time, located on the city's outskirts. It had training pitches for the first team and youth categories as well as facilities for club members, such as swimming pools and recreational rooms. At the time, Real Madrid also had sections devoted to other sports, such as tennis, and these athletes trained there as well.

The site also contained the Pabellón Raimundo Saporta, built in 1966, where Real Madrid's basketball team played its home games for 38 years. Some of Europe's greatest players, including Dražen Petrović and Arvydas Sabonis of later NBA fame, once called it home.

=== Controversy ===
By the end of the 20th century the land surrounding the Ciudad Deportiva was no longer on the outskirts of Madrid, but had become a transportation hub with the north of the city and a financial area. Its location along the Castellana further increased the land's value. With Real Madrid's debts mounting in the late 1990s, plans to re-zone and commercially develop the land were mooted several times, but it wasn't until the presidency of Florentino Pérez that these plans came to fruition.

Although commonly believed to be a direct transaction in which Real Madrid sold the land to the Madrid city council, this is not in fact what happened. In 2000 there was a motion proposed, voted on, and approved in the Madrid parliament to re-zone the area of the Ciudad Deportiva, which until then was zoned for non-commercial purposes. In this vote, the Partido Popular (People's Party) voted in favor, while the Spanish Socialist Workers' Party (PSOE) voted against.

The agreement between Real Madrid and the local government stipulated that in exchange for re-zoning the land Real Madrid would cede a portion of the land to the Government. Then, in public project bids, both Real Madrid and the Government sold their portions to four corporations, Repsol YPF, Mutua Automovilística de Madrid, Sacyr Vallehermoso and Obrascón Huarte Lain (OHL), for which Real Madrid earned an estimated 480 million euros. These four corporations were, as of August 2006, constructing four skyscrapers on the site which would become their headquarters as part of the Cuatro Torres Business Area. The government also gained land which they sold in public bidding, and a large amount of greenspace.

Although unnamed clubs requested that the European Union investigate the transaction, the EU found no wrongdoing or evidence of state subsidies.

=== Ciudad del Madrid ===
With a portion of the funds obtained from the Ciudad Deportiva, Real Madrid constructed new training facilities in Valdebebas, which like the Ciudad Deportiva in 1963, are currently on the outskirts of the city. The new facilities, named Ciudad Real Madrid and inaugurated in 2005, are extremely modern and at 1.2 square kilometres are ten times larger than the former facilities. This is the widest sport facility built in the world.

In these facilities we can find the training fields for all the teams of the different categories, the press room, restaurant, training fields for the first team, and the Alfredo di Stéfano Stadium (where the reserve team, Real Madrid Castilla, plays its matches).

Real Madrid President Florentino Perez, who was at the origin of this city, said about it: "If the Real Madrid is universal, this will be its capital. A city opened to anyone, a football dream: the Real Madrid City".
