= Torre de Cristal =

Skyscraper in the Cuatro Torres Business Area (CTBA) in Madrid, Spain

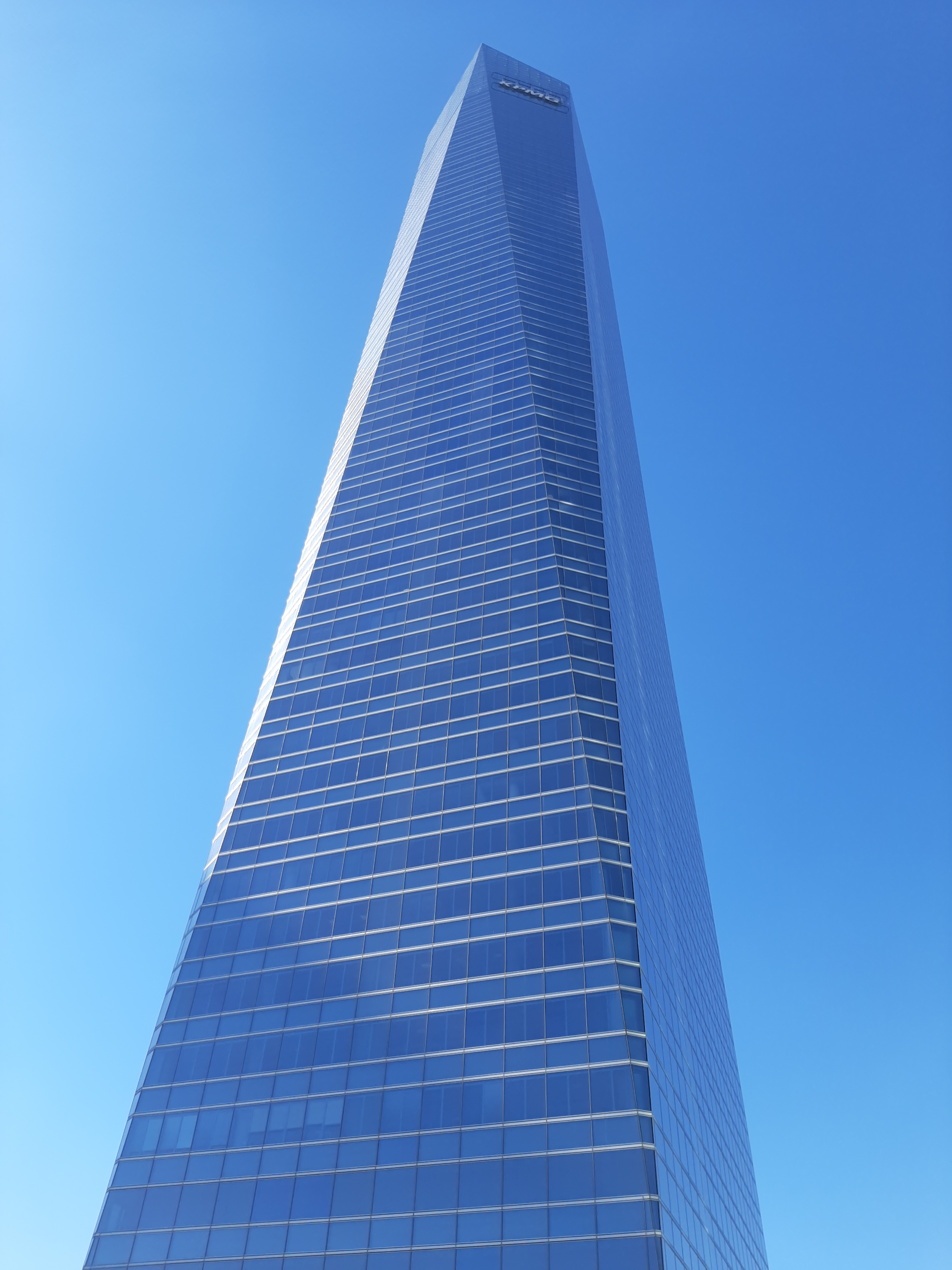
- Torre de Cristal in February 2020
- Interactive map of the Torre de Cristal area

General information
- Type: Office
- Location: Pº de la Castellana 259, CTBA, Madrid, Spain
- Coordinates: 40°28′41″N 3°41′14″W
- Construction started: 2004
- Completed: 2008
- Owner: KPMG; Mutua Madrileña

Height
- Architectural: 249 m (817 ft)
- Tip: 250 m (820 ft)
- Top floor: 210 m (690 ft)

Technical details
- Floor count: 52
- Floor area: 59,827 m^{2} (643,970 sq ft)
- Lifts/elevators: 27

Design and construction
- Architect: César Pelli
- Main contractor: Dragados

Website
- www.torredecristal.com

The Torre de Cristal (Spanish for Glass Tower) is a skyscraper in the Cuatro Torres Business Area (CTBA) in Madrid, Spain. Built between 2004 and 2008, the tower stands at 249 m (817 ft) tall with 52 floors and is the current tallest building in Spain, as well as the fifth-tallest in the European Union.

== History ==
The tower was designed by Cesar Pelli and built by Dragados as part of the Cuatro Torres Business Area complex in the Fuencarral-El Pardo district. It is owned by the insurance company Mutua Madrileña.

Construction began in 2004 and was completed on December 4, 2008. The Crystal Tower comprises a ground floor entrance, 46 floors dedicated exclusively to offices, and six underground parking levels with a capacity for approximately 1,250 cars. The facades are entirely covered in glass, and at the top, variations in the floor plan create changes in the four planes of the facade, giving the building the appearance of cut crystal. The tower was designed by the Argentine architect César Pelli. Architects Íñigo Ortiz and Enrique León also participated in the project. The structural engineer responsible for the project was José Ignacio Viñals Millán, who also oversaw the construction, along with engineer César Herrera Castilla.

The Tower has an A environmental rating. Among its advancements, its glazed façade stands out, featuring a bioclimatic wall system that integrates interior ventilation, automatically regulates solar control, and optimizes climate and energy consumption parameters.

== Edification ==
The total facade cladding required 44,000 square meters of glass. 90,000 cubic meters of earth were removed to excavate the area where the basements are located. The electrical cable used exceeds 250 kilometers. 40,000 cubic meters of concrete were used. The Tower has 27 elevators.

The Crystal Tower is diamond-shaped and, in the words of its architect, the Argentinian César Pelli, it attempts to be pure in its facets and flashes.

Inside, the entrance hall has a maximum height of 10 meters and is enclosed on all sides by floor-to-ceiling glazing. The floor plan is rectangular and measures 51 by 33 meters.

The mechanical structure that makes it up turns it into a giant puzzle. Most of the components were manufactured outside the building site.

=== Tenants ===
Its tenants include companies such as KPMG, Red Hat, SegurCaixa Adeslas, Shift Technology, Agbar, SEAT, Bovis and the Regus business center.

=== Vertical garden ===
Inside the building, specifically on its top floor, the Crystal Tower houses a vertical garden which is the tallest in Europe. The garden, measuring 600 m^{2}, is located behind the glass facade and can be seen from outside the building.

The garden's distinctive appearance is achieved by installing a vertical PVC structure covered with synthetic felt, where the various plant species take root. The plants thrive thanks to a sophisticated irrigation system that provides the necessary nutrients, creating a "green wall" whose design and color are determined by the selection and planting of specific, pre-specified species.

The concept of the rooftop winter garden is an original idea from the American landscape architecture firm, Balmori Associates. The design of the green wall is the work of the French botanist Patrick Blanc.

== Gallery ==
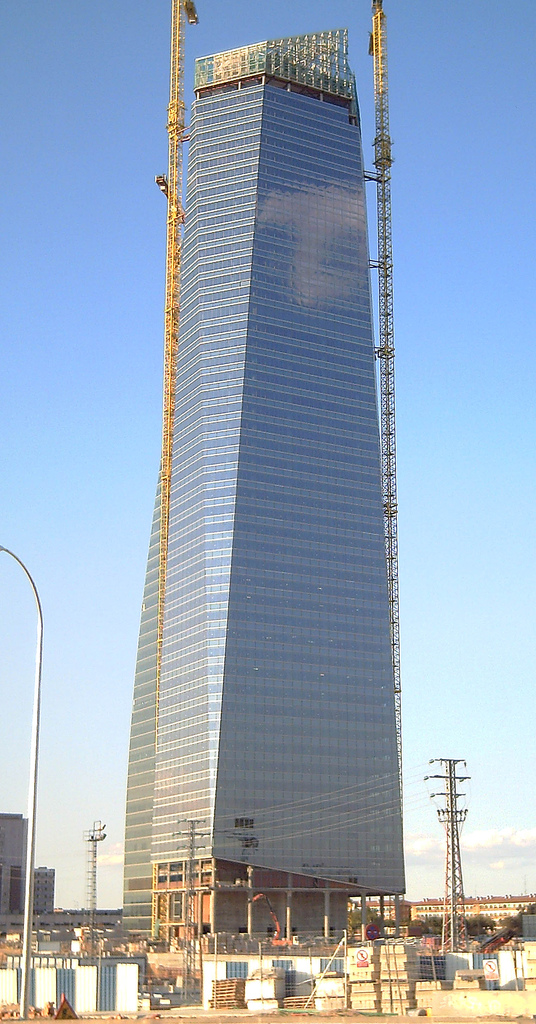
Torre de Cristal under construction

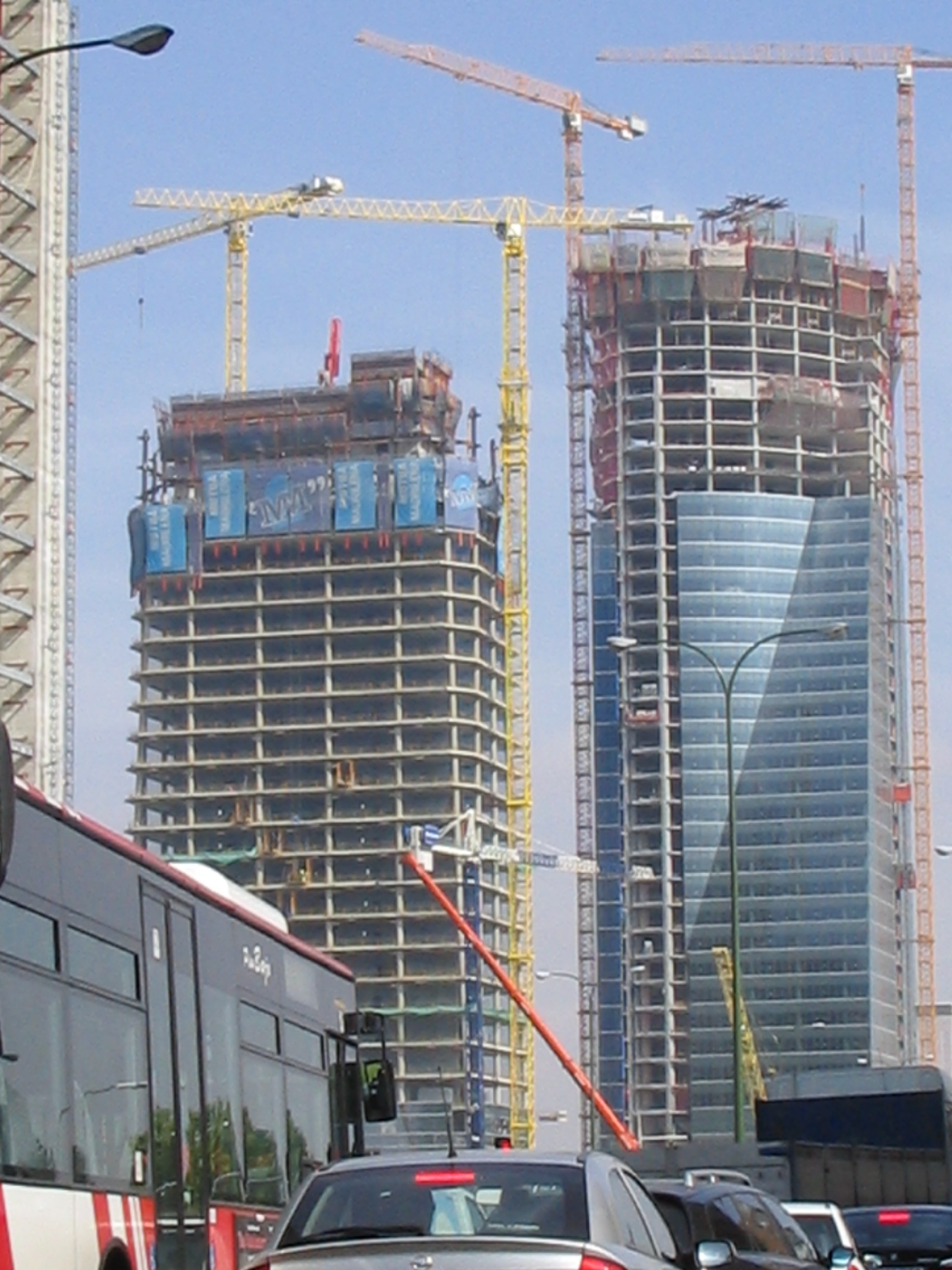
Torre Espacio and Torre de Cristal under construction

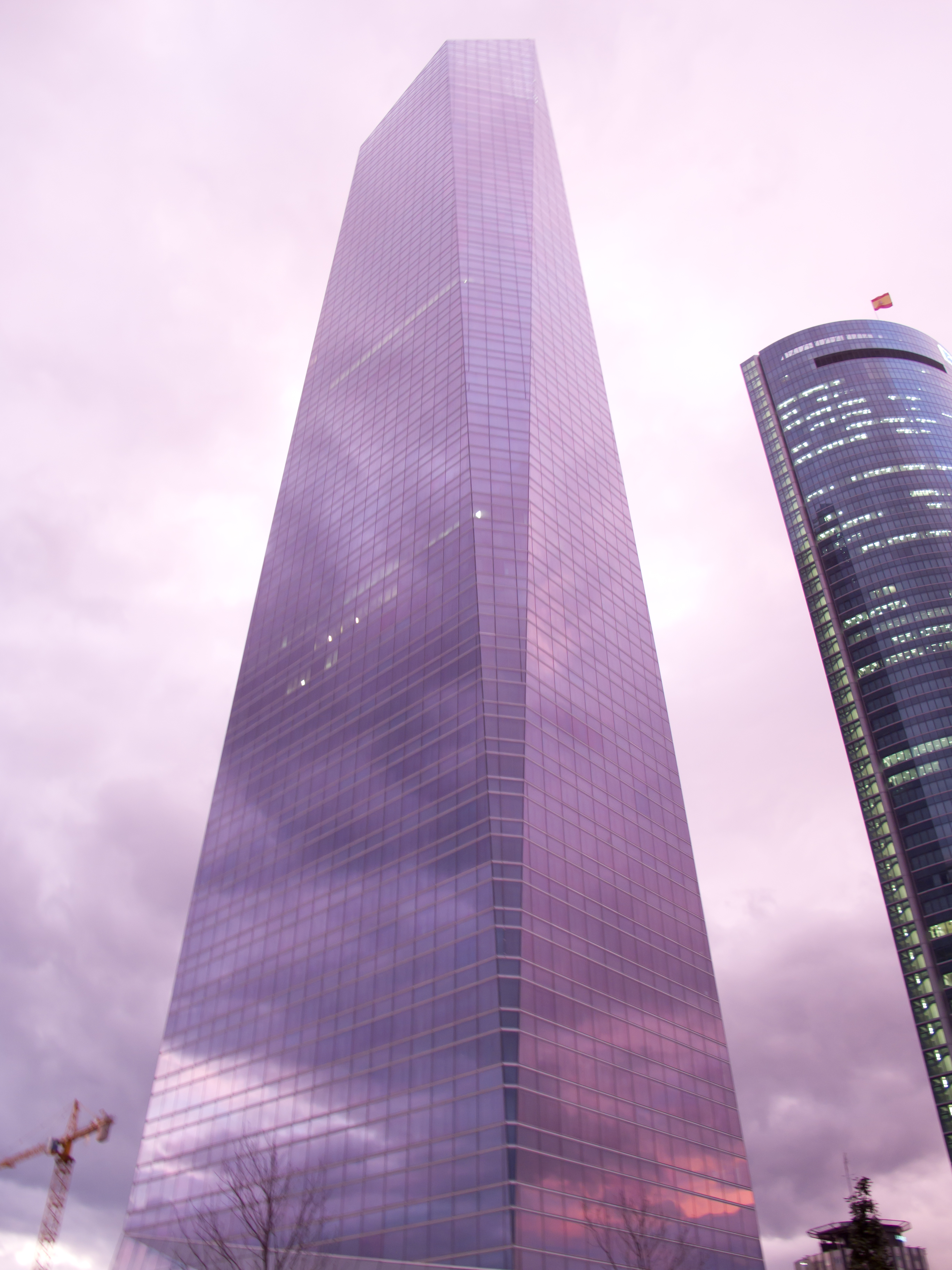
Torre de Cristal at twilight

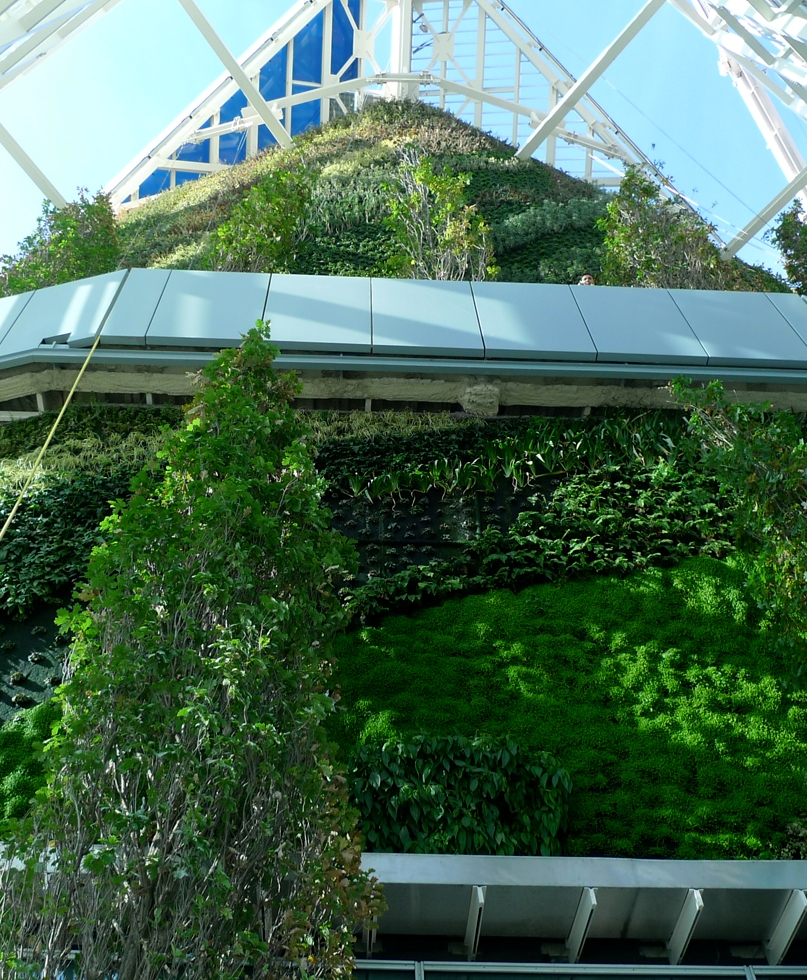
The vertical gardens

== See also ==
- List of tallest buildings in Spain
- List of tallest buildings in Madrid

Records
Preceded by Torre Emperador	Tallest building in Spain; 2008–present 249 metres (817 ft)	Incumbent
