= Valencia Tower =

Building in Madrid, Spain

Coordinates: 40.421353°N 3.679494°W

- Torre de Valencia
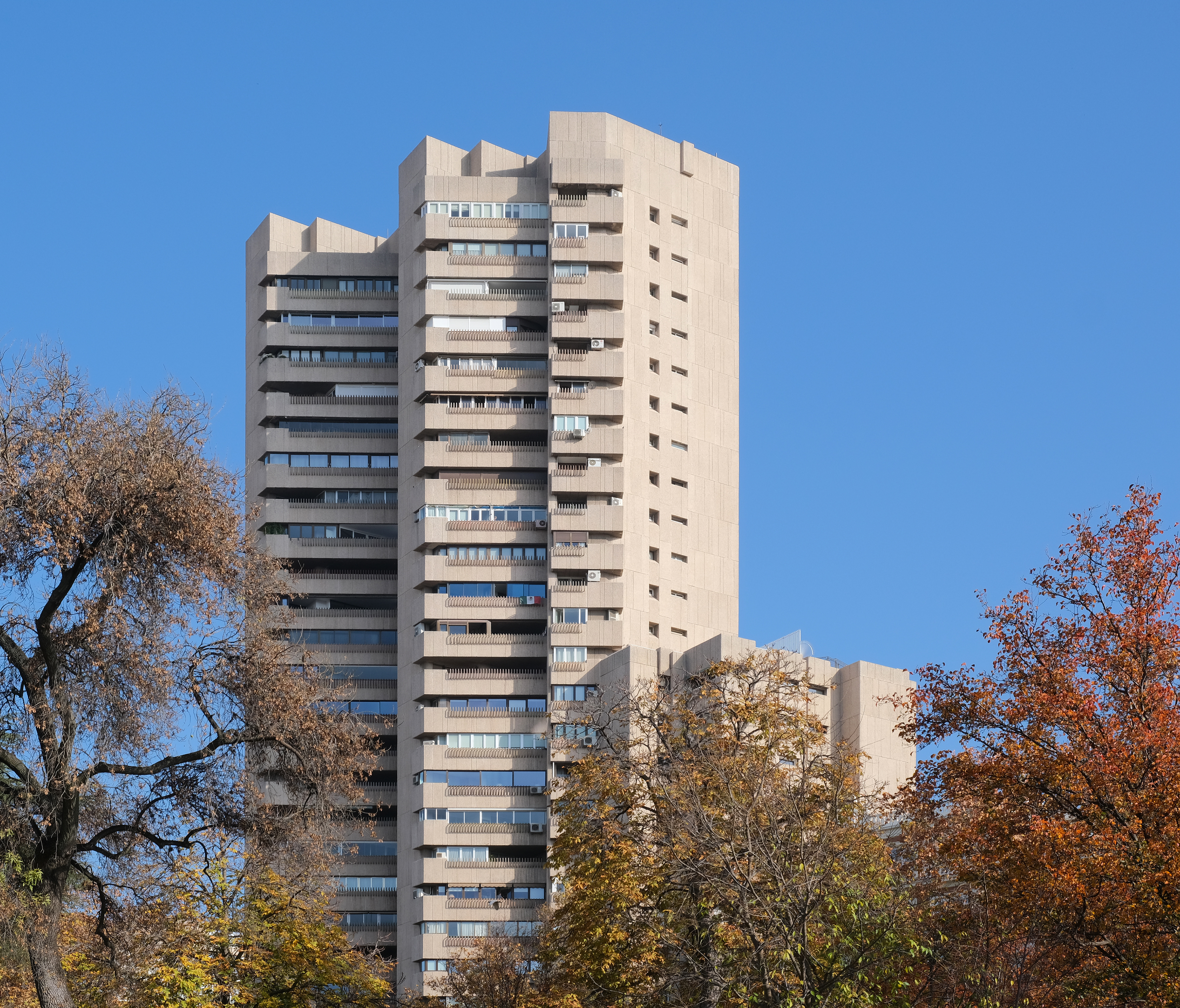
- Interactive map of the Valencia Tower area

General information
- Type: residential building
- Location: Ibiza, Madrid, Calle de O'Donnell 4 cv Avenida de Menéndez Pelayo 9, Spain
- Construction started: 1970
- Completed: 1973

Height
- Height: 94 m

Technical details
- Floor count: 29

Design and construction
- Architect: Javier Carvajal Ferrer

The Valencia Tower (Spanish: Torre de Valencia) is a residential building in Madrid, Spain. It is the most known as well as most controversial project by Javier Carvajal.

== History and description ==
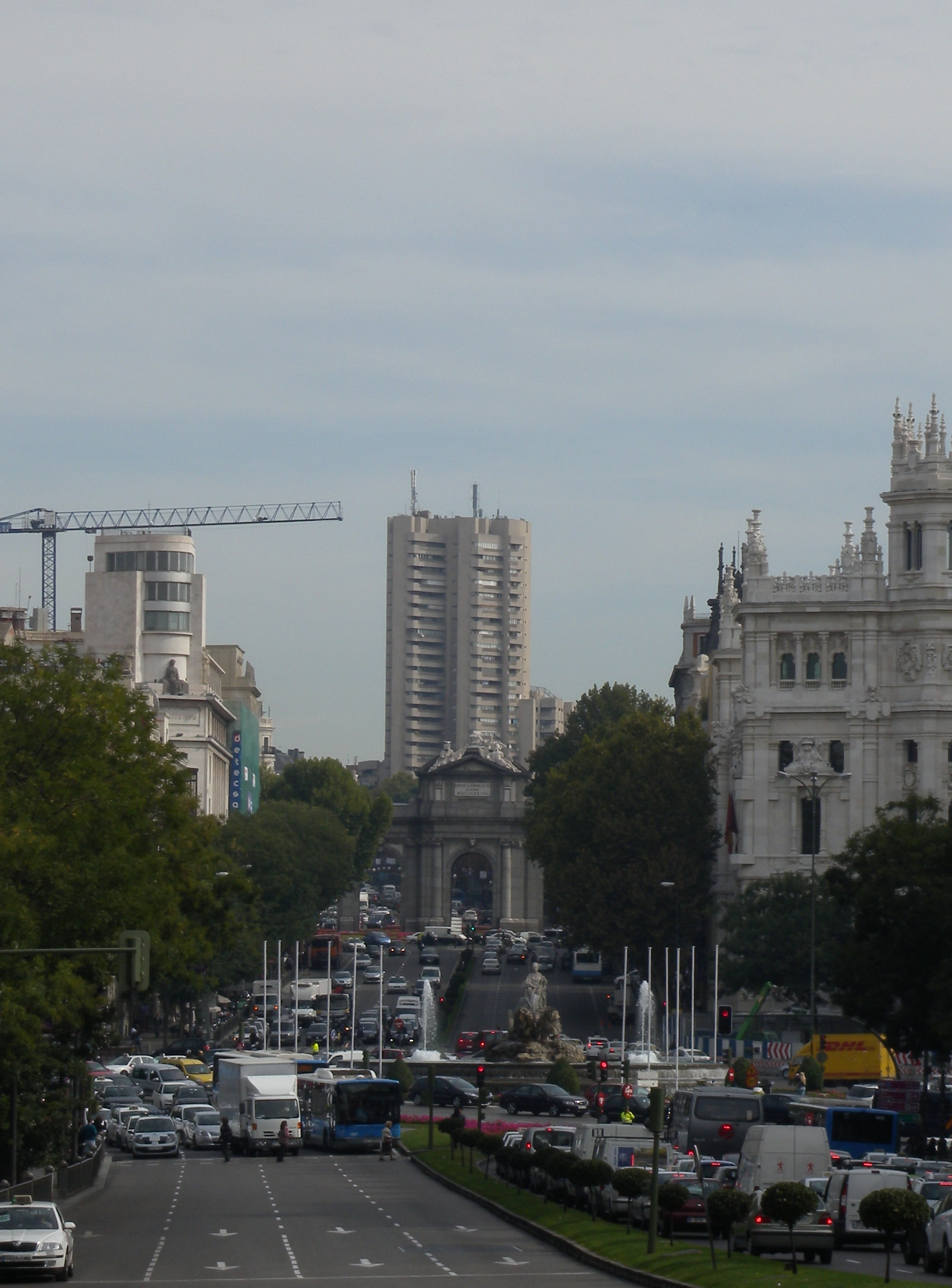
The building profile protrudes in the alignment of the plaza de Cibeles and the Puerta de Alcalá.

The project approval was passed by the City Council of Madrid in 1968. The building process took place between 1970 and 1973. The construction was temporarily halted by the City Council in April 1971 on behalf of the Ministry of Housing, on the basis of the complaints filed by the neighbours, who wanted the building to be tore down. The building was then acrimoniously derided in the pages of ABC. The works resumed in June. A 26-floor concrete tower, reaching a 94-metre height, it became the highest residential building in the Spanish capital when it was finally opened in 1973. It is located in the Retiro District, in front of the Retiro Park, in the junction of Menéndez Pelayo Avenue and O'Donnell Street.

It has been noted as "an elaborated product of (Carvajal's) organicism". A controversial work, it has been heavily criticised, particularly in terms of the visual impact it creates in the sight of the puerta de Alcalá from the plaza de Cibeles. Architect Santiago Fajardo defined the building as follows: "an extraordinary building, extraordinarily badly placed".

== Bibliography ==
- Capitel, Antón (1996). "Hacia la modernidad: Madrid, 1940-1980" (PDF). Madrid y sus arquitectos. 150 años de la Escuela de Arquitectura. TF Editores. pp. 57–70.
- Carvajal, Javier (1974). "Torre de Valencia - Madrid – España". Informes de la Construcción. 26 (257). Madrid: Instituto de Ciencias de la Construcción Eduardo Torroja. Consejo Superior de Investigaciones Científicas: 35–52. doi:10.3989/ic.1974.v26.i257.3062.
- Gozálvez, Patricia (8 November 2010). "Mírala, mírala, la Torre de Valencia". El País.
- Labarta Aizpún, Carlos; Tárrago Mingo, Jorge (2015). "Carvajal y la voluntad de ser arquitecto: la construcción del proyecto y la belleza eficaz" (PDF). Arquitectos y Profesores (12). Universidad de Sevilla: 38–51. doi:10.12795/ppa.2014.i12.03. ISSN 2171-6897.
- Prieto, Carlos (14 October 2018). "Lo que tapa el rascacielos que arruina las vistas a medio Madrid". El Confidencial.
- Río, Ángel del (15 July 2018). "1968: Un año prodigioso en la historia de la ciudad". La Razón.
