= Centro Internacional de Convenciones de la Ciudad de Madrid =

Coordinates: 40.477919°N 3.689488°W

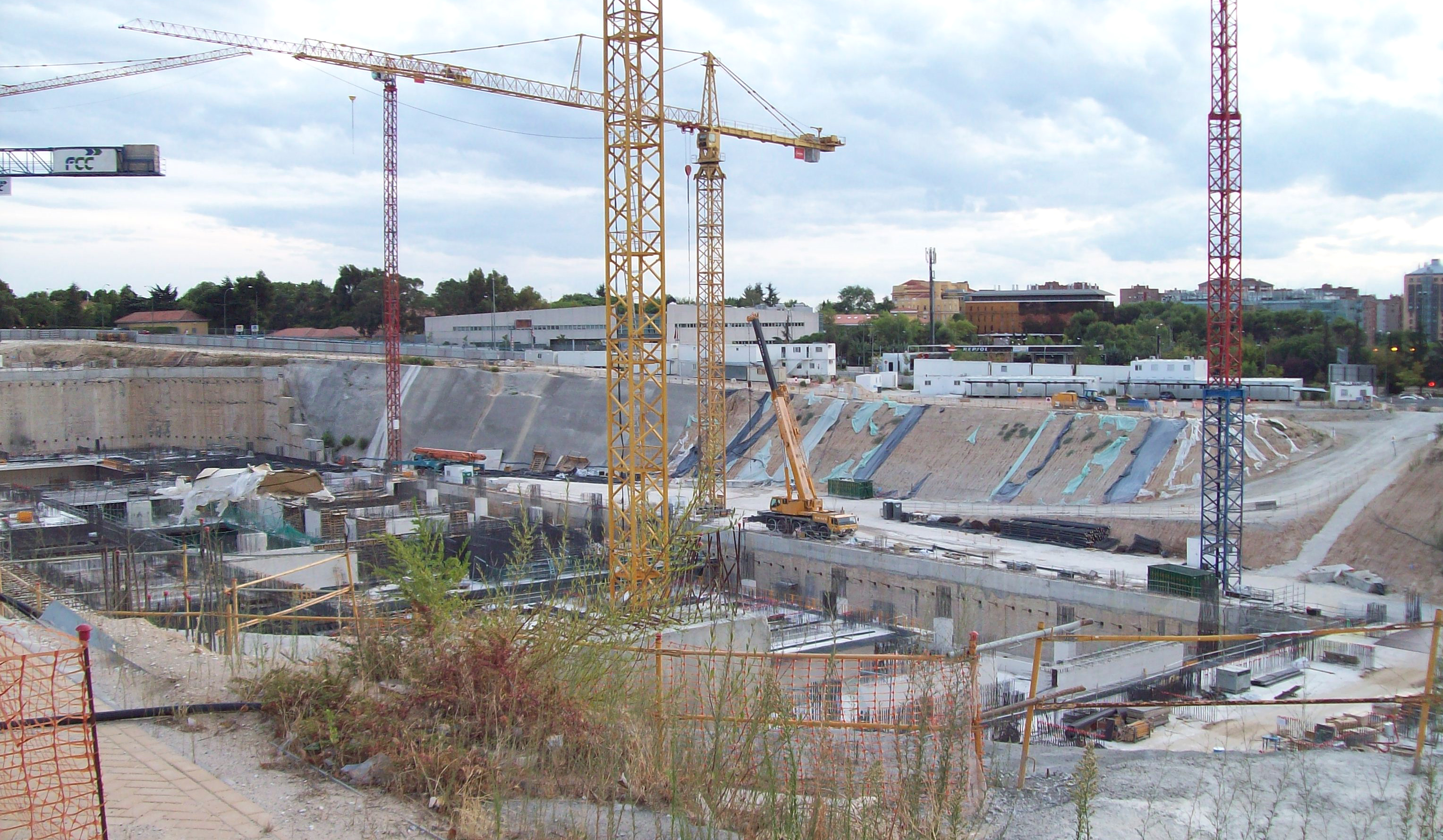
Construction works (August 2011).

The International Convention Center of the City of Madrid (Spanish: Centro Internacional de Convenciones de la Ciudad de Madrid) was a skyscraper project in Madrid, Spain.

It was planned to be 119 meters tall, and was initially scheduled to be opened in 2014. It was to have contained three covered auditoriums and have a total capacity for 30,000 people. Construction was halted in 2012 due to a lack of funds after €100 million had already been spent on the project, with the excavation, foundation and ground floors of the complex having been completed. Alternatives to reuse the site were soon sought. In January 2017, Caleido, a 181-metre skyscraper that will house the private university IE University, a private hospital of the Quirón group, as well as a shopping centre, was publicly presented. For the land concession, Grupo Villar Mir will pay a fee of €4 million per year to the City Council for 75 years.

Architects:

- Emilio Tuñón Álvarez (Mansilla+Tuñón)
- Luis Moreno Mansilla (Mansilla+Tuñón)
- Matilde Peralta del Amo.
