= Torre PwC =

Skyscraper in Madrid, Spain

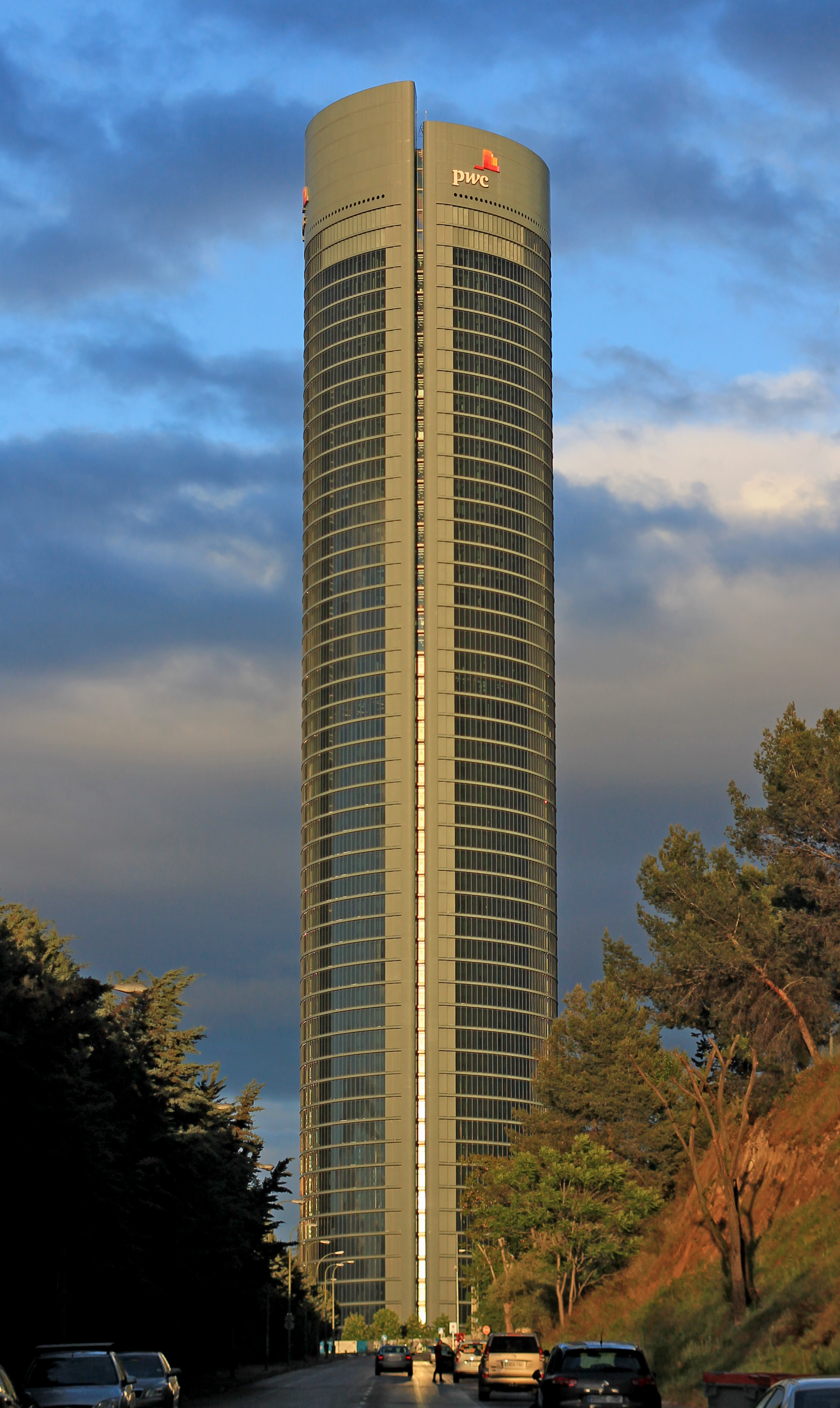
- Torre PwC in April 2017
- Interactive map of the Torre PwC area

General information
- Type: Office, Hotel
- Location: Pº de la Castellana 259, CTBA, Madrid, Spain
- Coordinates: 40°28′36″N 3°41′16″W
- Construction started: 2004
- Completed: 2008
- Owner: PricewaterhouseCoopers

Height
- Roof: 236 m (774 ft)

Technical details
- Floor count: 52
- Lifts/elevators: Made by Schindler Group

Design and construction
- Architects: Carlos Rubio Carvajal and Enrique Álvarez-Sala Walther
- Main contractor: Sacyr SAU

The Torre PwC, formerly known as Torre Sacyr Vallehermoso, is a mixed-use skyscraper located in Madrid, Spain. Built between 2004 and 2008, the tower stands at 236 m (774 ft) with 52 floors and is one of four buildings in the Cuatro Torres Business Area. It was designed by Carlos Rubio Carvajal and Enrique Álvarez-Sala Walter and was built by Sacyr Sau.

It is the only tower with double skin facade and it is covered entirely of glass in the form of flakes. On the upper deck there are 3 wind turbines, of 2.5 kW each, capable of producing wind energy for use in the building.

== History ==
Spain's short tradition of skyscraper construction, combined with its location in a higher part of the city, creates a striking effect on Madrid's skyline. The Torre stands out among the other skyscrapers in the CTBA (Madrid Business Park) due to the clarity of its volume. The building is fragmented into three sections by fissures, increasing the sense of verticality. These fissures also allow light to enter, creating the illusion of a single structure.

The architects of the project are the Spaniards Carlos Rubio Carvajal and Enrique Álvarez-Sala Walther. Its floor plan is roughly that of an equilateral triangle with curved sides (although it could more accurately be described as three arches enclosing three cylinders arranged in a triangle), and the windows have a special arrangement that offers minimal wind resistance. All office floors have the same area of 1,258.23 m² and are divided into three sections or segments.

The building has 50 usable floors, 52 for calculation purposes. Floors 51 to 54 are dedicated to general facilities and equipment for the PwC Tower. Floors 55 to 58 are dedicated to the building's roof and other general facilities and equipment for the Tower. It is the only tower with a double-skin façade and is completely covered in glass in a scale-like pattern. On the top roof, there are three 2.5 kW wind turbines capable of producing wind energy for the building's use.

== Tenants ==
The building houses the five-star hotel Eurostars Madrid Tower which occupies 60% of the tower, with rooms between floors 6 and 27 and at its upper part, a two-storey dining room offering a panoramic view of the city. The professional services firm PricewaterhouseCoopers (PwC) moved its offices in the capital (about 2500 professionals) to this building in July 2011, taking up seventeen floors, between floors 34 and 50, which were vacant at that time. On the same date, the PwC logo was mounted at the top of the building, becoming the highest logo in Spain, installed at almost 236 meters of height. All the office floors have the same area of 1,258.23 m^{2} (13,543.5 sq ft) and are divided into three sectors or segments. Floors 51-58 are intended for general facilities and equipment of the tower. The building was renamed Torre PwC instead of Torre Sacyr Vallehermoso, after PwC relocated to the tower in 2011.

In July 2011, the professional services firm PwC (PricewaterhouseCoopers) moved all of its Madrid offices (approximately 2,300 professionals) to this building, occupying the last seventeen floors, from the 34th to the 50th, which had remained vacant until then. As part of the agreement, following the move, the building was renamed Torre PwC instead of Torre Sacyr Vallehermoso.

The building was constructed by the Sacyr group, which controlled it through its real estate subsidiary Testa. In 2015, Sacyr sold its subsidiary to the REIT Merlin Properties, becoming the new owner of the building. Subsequently, Merlin sold Testa to Blackstone, but the tower was not included in the sale, remaining part of Merlin's portfolio.

== Gallery ==
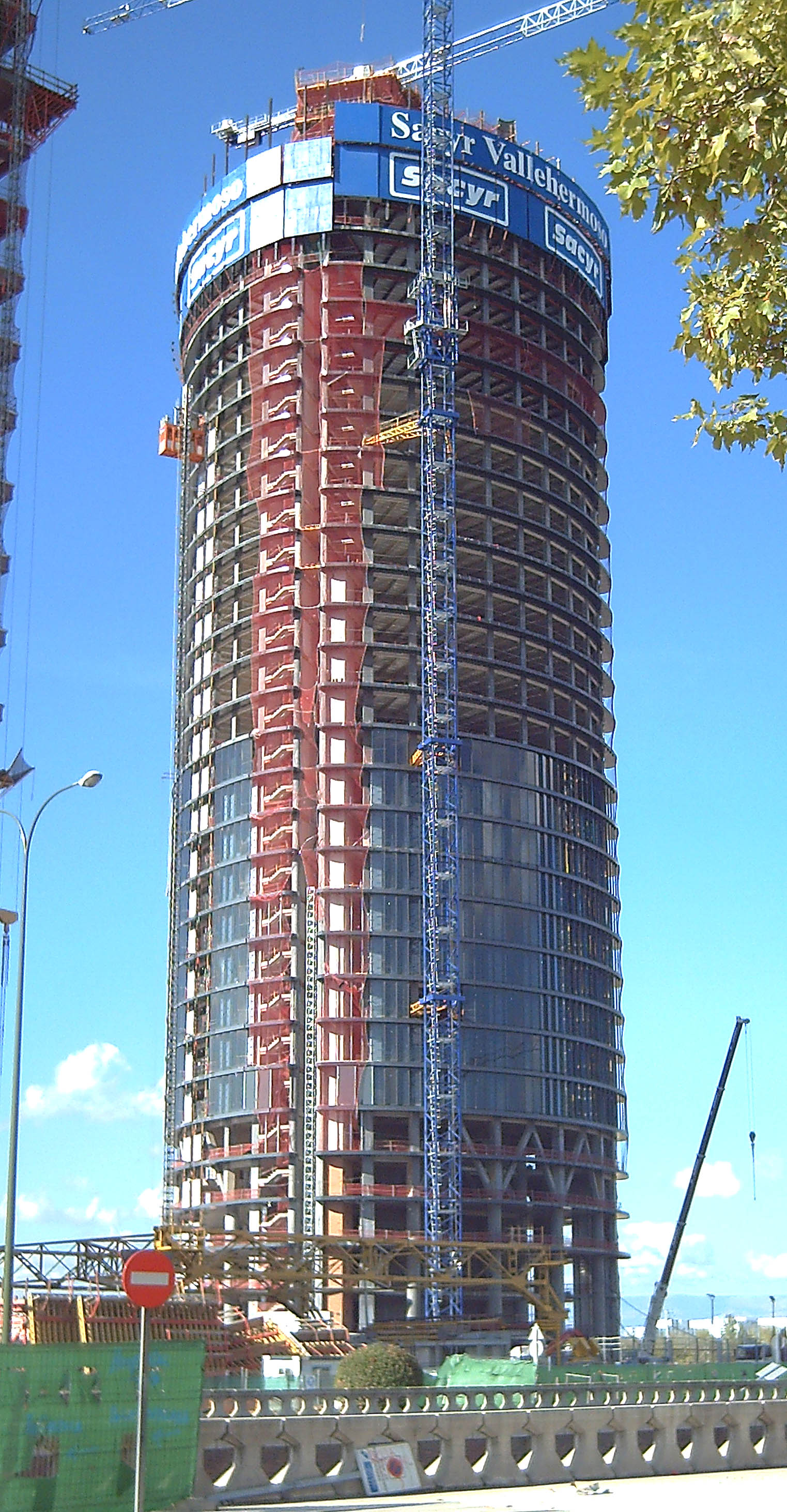
The tower during its construction, November 9, 2006

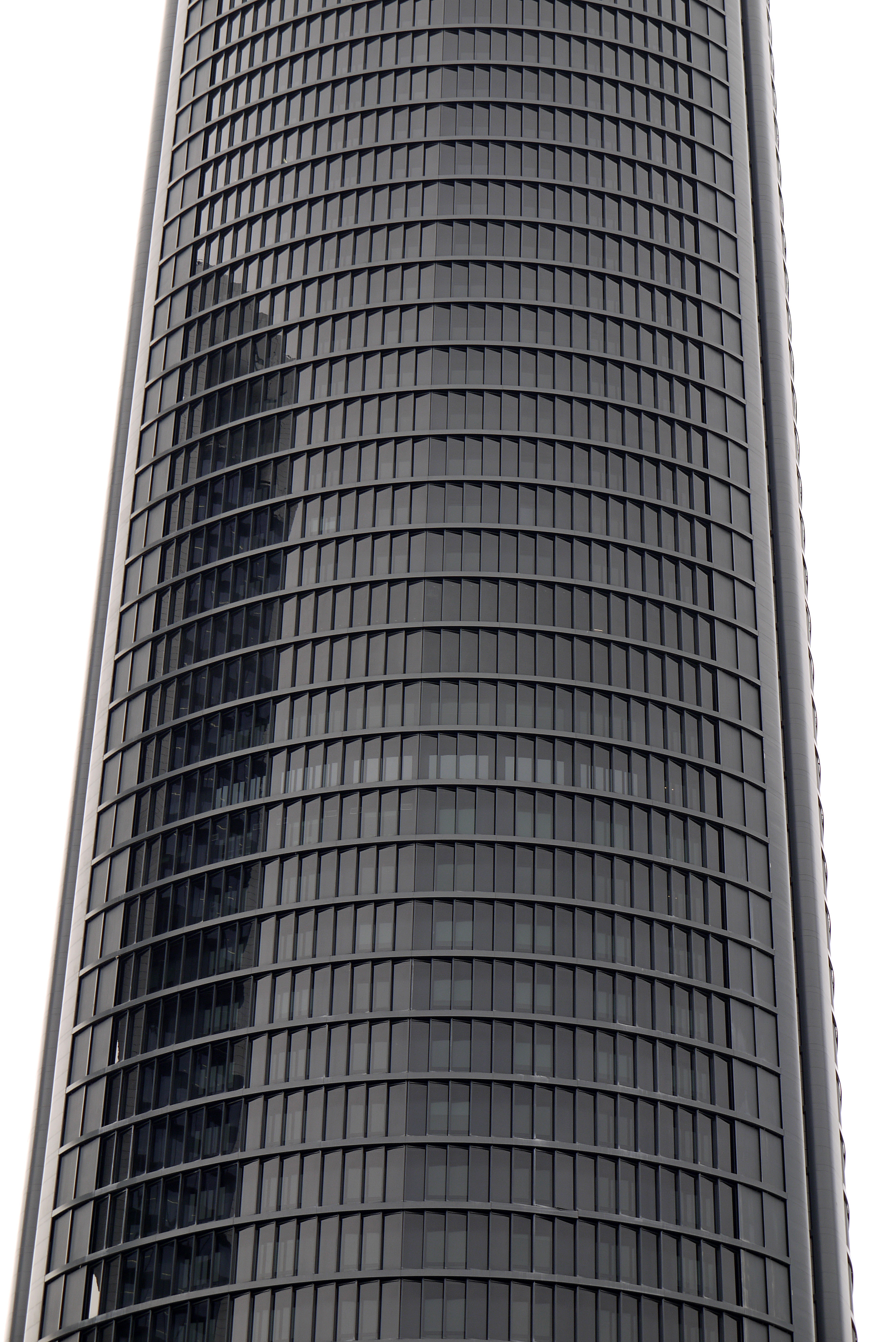
The tower is covered with a double-skin facade in black

== See also ==
- Cuatro Torres Business Area
- List of tallest buildings in Europe
- List of tallest buildings in Madrid
