= Obrascón Huarte Lain =

Spanish multinational construction and civil engineering company

Obrascón Huarte Lain, S.A.

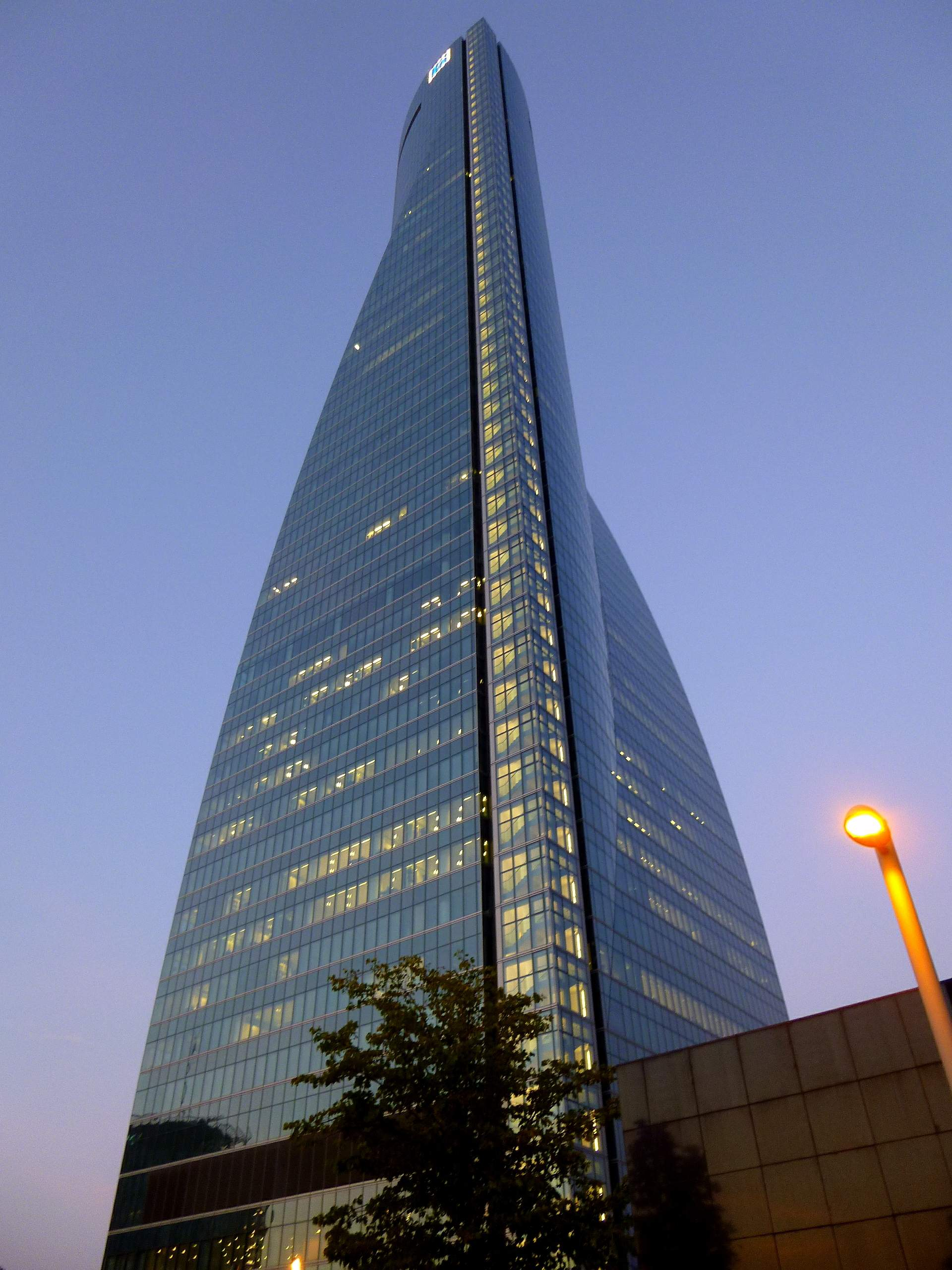
- Headquarters in Madrid, Spain
- Company type: Sociedad Anónima
- Traded as: BMAD: OHL
- ISIN: ES0142090317
- Industry: Construction
- Founded: 1911
- Headquarters: Torre Espacio, Madrid, Spain
- Products: Infrastructure construction, toll-road and other transport concessions, residential and non-residential property
- Revenue: ▲€5.218 billion (2015)
- Operating income: ▼€849.477 million (2015)
- Net income: ▲€55.632 million (2015)
- Total assets: ▲€15.288 billion (2015)
- Total equity: ▲€4.811 billion (2015)
- Number of employees: ▲26,661 (2015)
- Website: https://ohla-group.com/en/home/

Obrascón Huarte Lain, S.A. (Spanish pronunciation: [oβɾasˈkon ˈwaɾte ˈlajn]); branded as OHLA Progress Enablers since July 2021, is a Spanish multinational construction and civil engineering company. The company is involved in infrastructure and commercial property construction, homebuilding and the operation of toll road and other transport concessions. In the latter, the group is particularly active in Mexico. OHLA also has a majority-owned American subsidiary called OHL USA which is based in College Point, New York.

OHLA was established through the $900 million merger of the firms Obrascón-Huarte and Construcciones Lain in 1999.

== History ==
Logo used from 1999 until July 2021.

The company's roots stretch back to May 1911 with the foundation of Sociedad General de Obras y Construcciones Obrascón, S.A. in Bilbao, whose first project was the construction of two wharfs in the Port of Lisbon. The company grew over the decades, being acquired first by the Banco de Bilbao in 1953 and then by Altos Hornos de Vizcaya 20 years later. Obrascón fell into financial difficulties in the late 1980s, however, and was bought from bankruptcy for one penny in 1987 by Juan-Miguel Villar Mir. Villar turned around the firm's fortunes and it listed on the Bolsa de Madrid in 1991.

In 1998 Obrascón merged with its larger, but struggling, rival Huarte, a major construction firm established by Felix Huarte in Pamplona in 1927. The following year a further merger was conducted with Construcciones Lain, a publicly traded firm founded as the Spanish arm of John Laing Construction in 1963.

On November 30, 2010, OHL acquired 50.1% of the US construction company Judlau Contracting, Inc., specialized in civil engineering with headquarters operations in the state of New York.

On April 16, 2014, OHL lost the largest case for damages in the history of Gibraltar, having been judged to fail to comply with the terms of a contract to build a tunnel to cross the Gibraltar International Airport runway.

In May 2014, Miguel Fraile testified to Quebec's Charbonneau Commission that a Quebec-based competitor firm, SNC-Lavalin (SNC), wanted the business of the McGill University Health Centre (MUHC) to itself. SNC vice-president Riadh Ben Aissa “started by asking, who am I? Who is OHL? We are nothing. We are nobody. Montreal is SNC’s city, the MUHC is its project” as the corruption inquiry continued its study of the CAD$1.3-billion hospital project. Fraile reported that Ben Aissa told him OHL must withdraw from the bidding, which was set close in March 2010, and that SNC was a “powerful company in Canada," and if OHL dropped out of the bid, the two firms might be able to team up in the future. “He said that if we won the contract, he would make our lives impossible.” The senior management of SNC, including Ben Aissa, has since been charged or dismissed under suspicion, and the premises have been raided by the Royal Canadian Mounted Police. OHL did not win the MUHC bid, even though it outbid SNC by $60 million.

In 2019, it is being investigated for the alleged payment of irregular commissions by managers of the construction company to municipalities and autonomous communities in exchange for public works awards.

In July 2022, the company was fined €21.5 million, along with five other contractors, by the Comisión Nacional de los Mercados y la Competencia (CNMC) for bidding collusion in public tenders for building and civil infrastructure works.
