= List of tallest buildings in Benidorm =

Skyline of Benidorm
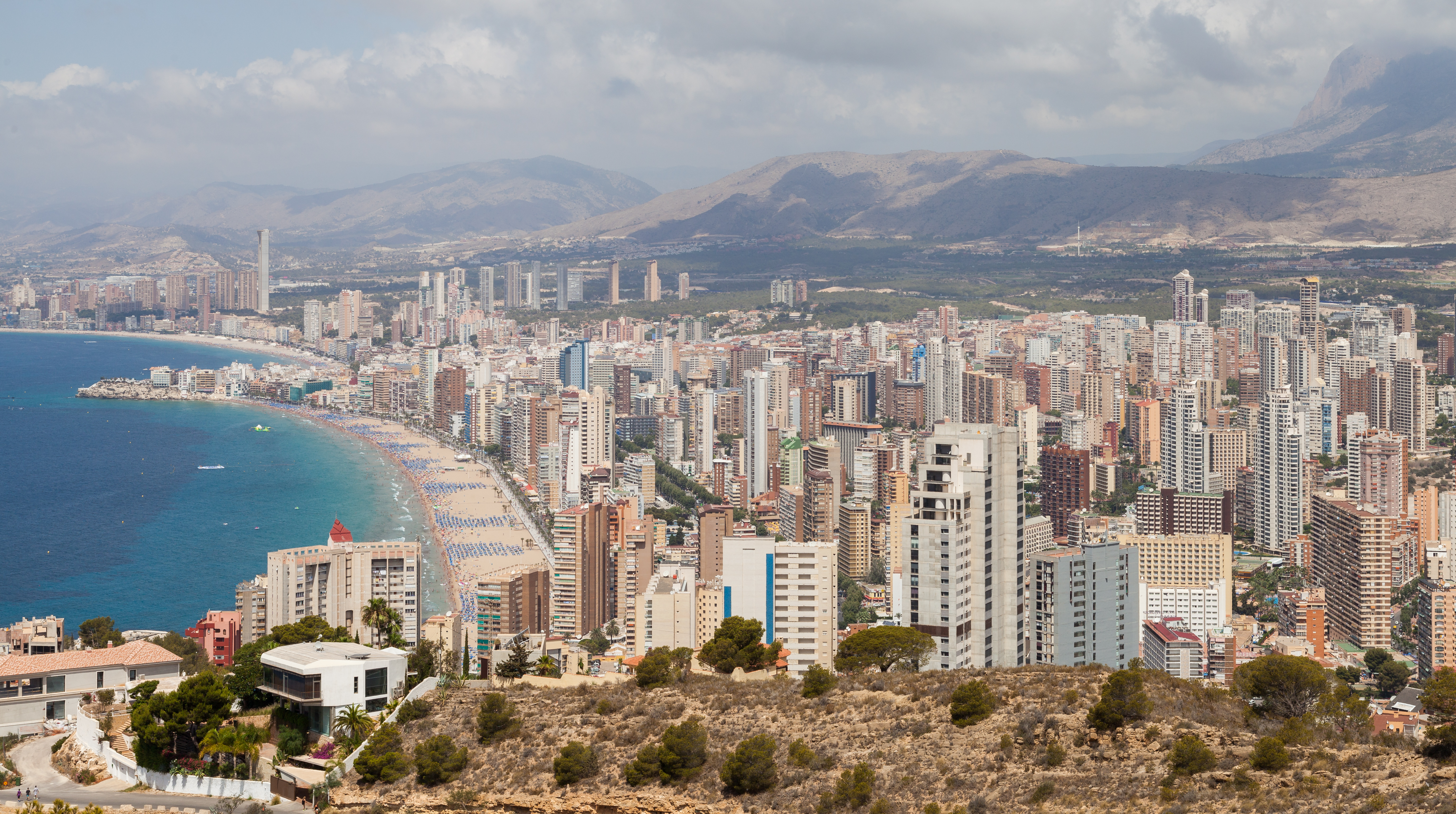
- Benidorm in 2014
- Tallest building: Intempo (2021)
- Tallest building height: 202.5 m (664 ft)
- First 150 m+ building: Gran Hotel Bali (2002)

Number of tall buildings (2026)
- Taller than 100 m (328 ft): 33
- Taller than 150 m (492 ft): 4

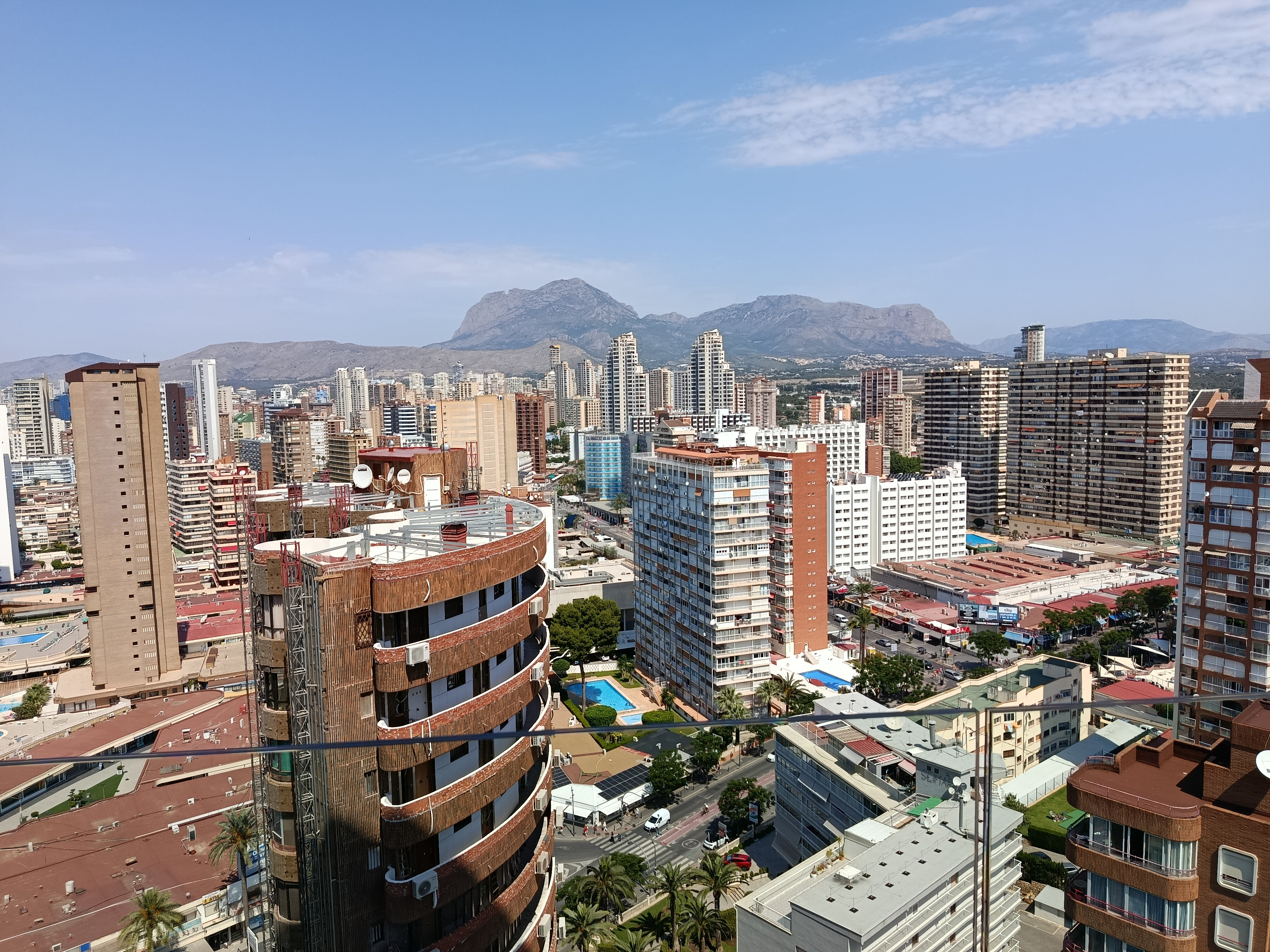
A closer view of Benidorm's high-rise cityscape.

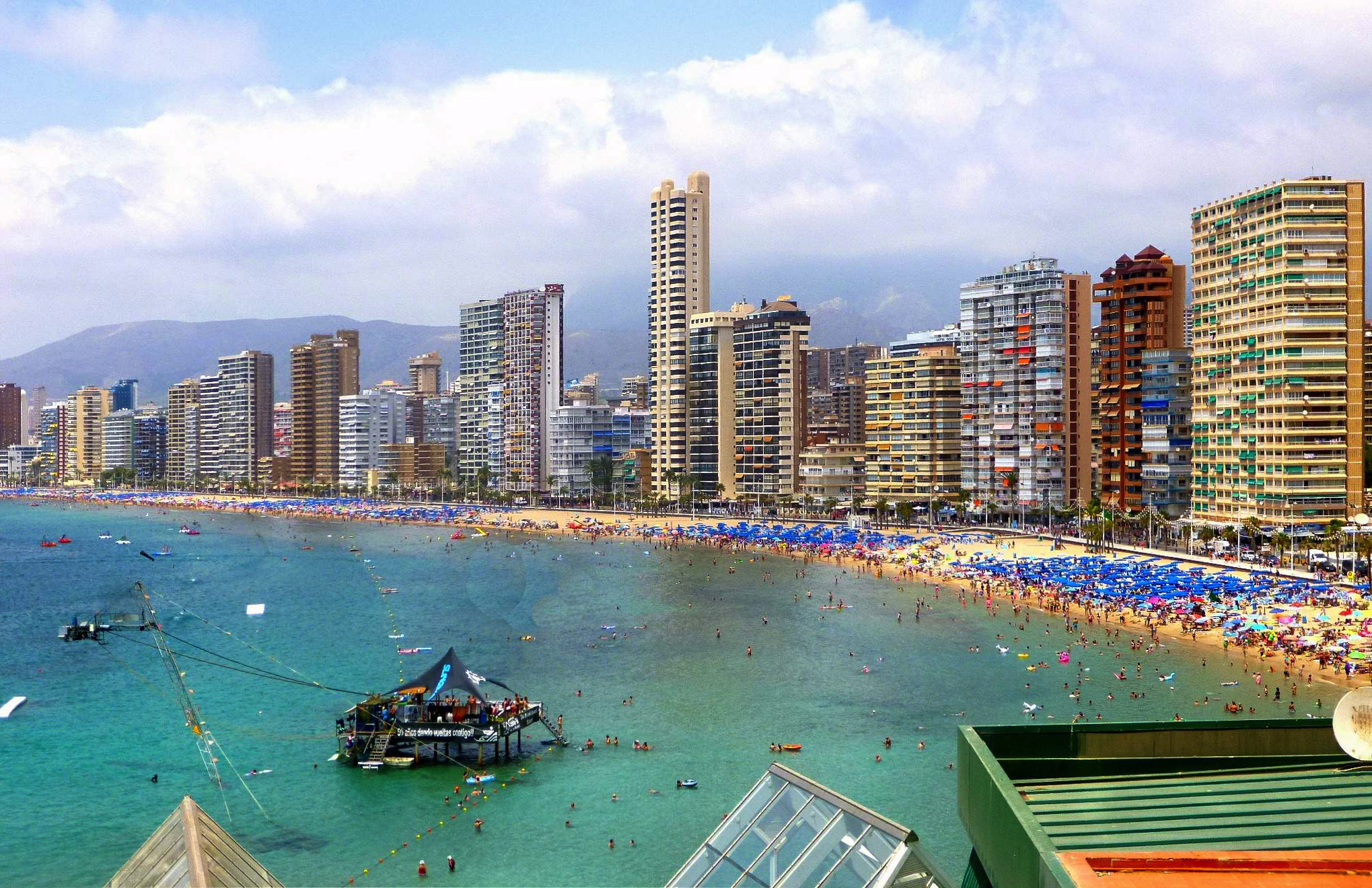
High-rises along Poniente Beach

Benidorm is a city and municipality in southeastern Spain, located 40 km (25 mi) from Alicante. Despite a relatively low population of 77,000, Benidorm has one of the largest skylines in the European Union. A major summer destination for tourists, especially from the United Kingdom, Benidorm is known for its density of high-rise buildings. Their abundance has given the city the nicknames of Beni York, Little Manhattan, and the Manhattan of Spain. As of 2026, Benidorm is home to 33 buildings taller than 100 metres (328 ft), placing it ahead of Madrid as the city with the most such buildings in Spain. Four skyscrapers reach a height of 150 m (492 ft), the second most of any Spanish city after Madrid. The tallest building in Benidorm is Intempo, a 202.5 m (664 ft) tall residential skyscraper completed in 2021.

Benidorm was a small town for most of its history. By the 1950s, the town's fishing industry, which was the mainstay of the local economy, was in decline. Under mayor Pedro Zaragoza, Benidorm began to reinvent itself as a summer tourist destination. Zaragoza encouraged the development of high-rises in Benidorm, which would allow more people to see the beaches and feel the sea air. The approval of a General Urban Development Plan in 1956 limited urban sprawl in favor of more compact vertical development. Benidorm's high-rise urban form took shape over the following decades as tourism continued to grow. Catalan architect Juan Guardiola Gaya was an influential figure in Benidorm's early skyline, designing the Torre Coblanca, one of Benidorm's first high-rises, as well as the curving bays of the 20-storey Coblanca 5.

Benidorm underwent a large construction boom in the 2000s. While only three buildings in the city were taller than 100 m (328 ft) before 2000, new high-rises began to soar above that height regularly. The 186 m (610 ft) tall Gran Hotel Bali became the tallest building in Spain upon its completion in 2002, and remained so until 2008. Other notable skyscrapers built during the decade include Torre Lúgano, Neguri Gane, and Edificio Kronos. The Great Recession significantly impacted high-rise development in Benidorm, and few tall buildings were constructed during the 2010s. Plans for Intempo were put forward in 2006, with construction beginning in 2007, but work on the skyscraper was affected due to the financial crisis. Intempo would finally be finished in 2021, making it the tallest residential building in Spain. The 2020s have seen an uptick in development with projects such as Sunset Sailors and Benidorm Beach. TM Tower, currently under construction, will become the EU's tallest residential skyscraper at 230 m (750 ft) tall upon its completion in 2028.

Unlike most other European cities, high-rises can be found in high concentration throughout Benidorm. Virtually all of them are hotel buildings or for residential use. Due to its low permanent population, Benidorm is considered to have the most skyscrapers per capita of any city in the world. The city's skyline is framed by the Mediterranean Sea to its south and the Puig Campana, the second-highest mountain in the province of Alicante, to its northwest.

== History ==
Number of buildings by height in Benidorm by the end of each year, based on the information in this article. Click on the legend to toggle a specific height on or off. View chart definition.

== Map of tallest buildings ==
The map below displays the location of all buildings taller than 100 m (328 ft) in Benidorm. Each marker is numbered by the building's height rank, and coloured by the decade of its completion.

Buildings taller than 100 m (328 ft) in Benidorm.
- 1980s
- 1990s
- 2000s
- 2010s
- 2020s
1 Intempo
2 Gran Hotel Bali
3 Torre Lúgano
4 Sunset Sailors Tower 1
5 Neguri Gane
6 Edificio Kronos
7 Benidorm Beach
8 Edificio Don Jorge
9 El Mirador del Mediterráneo
10 Torre Levante
11 Costa Blanca I
12 Miragolf Playa 2
13 Gemelos 26 Torre I
14 Gemelos 26 Torre II
15 Torre d'Oboe I
16 Torre d'Oboe II
17 Sunset Sailors Tower 2
18 Sol de Poniente 2
19 Beni Beach
20 Sunset Cliffs Torre 2
21 Playa Azul
22 Torre Pinar
23 Miragolf Playa I
24 Residencial Islamar 2
25 Residencial Islamar 3
26 Sunset Waves I
27 Sunset Waves II
28 Las Terrazas de Benidorm 1
29 Las Terrazas de Benidorm 2
30 Hotel Port Benidorm
31 Torre Doscalas
32 Gemelos 22 Torre 1
33 Gemelos 22 Torre 2

== Tallest buildings ==
This list ranks completed buildings in Benidorm that stand at least 100 m (328 ft) tall as of 2026, based on standard height measurement. This includes spires and architectural details but does not include antenna masts. The “Year” column indicates the year of completion. Buildings tied in height are sorted by year of completion with earlier buildings ranked first, and then alphabetically.

Was the tallest building in Benidorm upon completion

Rank	Name	Image	Location	Height m (ft)	Floors	Year	Purpose	Notes
1	Intempo		38°32′16″N 0°09′17″W	202.5 (664)	47	2021	Residential	Tallest building in Benidorm completed in the 2020s. Tallest building in Spain outside of Madrid. Tallest residential building in Spain. Features two towers connected by an elliptical cone on its top floors. Although construction initially began in 2007, work on the building was greatly affected by the Great Recession. The building was nearly complete by 2014, but would only be fully finished in 2021.
2	Gran Hotel Bali		38°31′53″N 0°09′51″W	186 (610)	52	2002	Hotel	Tallest building in Benidorm from 2002 to 2021. Tallest building in Spain from 2002 to 2008, when it was overtaken by the Torre Emperador in Madrid. Tallest building completed in Benidorm in the 2000s. Tallest hotel building in Benidorm. At the time of its opening, it was the second tallest hotel in Europe.
3	Torre Lúgano		38°32′06″N 0°05′58″W	158 (518)	43	2007	Residential	Tallest residential building in Spain from 2007 to 2021.
4	Sunset Sailors Tower 1		38°32′15″N 0°09′05″W	151 (495)	40	2026	Residential	
5	Neguri Gane		38°32′40″N 0°07′17″W	148 (486)	43	2002	Residential	Tallest residential building in Spain from 2002 to 2008.
6	Edificio Kronos		38°32′48″N 0°07′18″W	140 (460)	41	2008	Residential	
7	Benidorm Beach		38°32′04″N 0°09′45″W	126 (413)	36	2024	Residential	
8	Edificio Don Jorge		38°32′08″N 0°06′00″W	124 (407)	36	2008	Residential	
9	El Mirador del Mediterráneo		38°32′01″N 0°06′09″W	123 (404)	32	2006	Residential	
10	Torre Levante		38°32′06″N 0°06′46″W	120 (390)	35	1985	Residential	Tallest building in Benidorm from 1985 to 2002. Tallest building completed in Benidorm in the 1980s.
11	Costa Blanca I		38°32′48″N 0°07′45″W	116 (381)	36	1993	Residential	Tallest building completed in Benidorm in the 1990s.
12	Miragolf Playa 2		38°32′32″N 0°08′55″W	115 (377)	33	2005	Residential	
13	Gemelos 26 Torre I		38°32′19″N 0°06′42″W	114 (374)	33	2009	Residential	
14	Gemelos 26 Torre II		38°32′20″N 0°06′40″W	114 (374)	33	2009	Residential	
15	Torre d'Oboe I		38°32′32″N 0°07′02″W	114 (374)	31	2009	Residential	
16	Torre d'Oboe II		38°32′32″N 0°07′05″W	114 (374)	31	2009	Residential	
17	Sunset Sailors Tower 2		38°32′15″N 0°09′04″W	113 (371)	30	2026	Residential	
18	Sol de Poniente 2		38°32′32″N 0°09′06″W	112 (367)	33	2005	Residential	
19	Beni Beach		38°32′16″N 0°08′30″W	110 (360)	35	1996	Residential	
20	Sunset Cliffs Torre 2	—	38°32′16″N 0°09′01″W	106.2 (348)	31	2022	Residential	
21	Playa Azul		38°32′25″N 0°06′33″W	105 (344)	34	2002	Residential	
22	Torre Pinar		38°32′29″N 0°08′55″W	105 (344)	30	2004	Residential	
23	Miragolf Playa I		38°32′34″N 0°08′56″W	105 (344)	30	2005	Residential	
24	Residencial Islamar 2		38°32′26″N 0°09′04″W	104 (341)	28	2010	Residential	Tallest buildings completed in Benidorm in the 2010s.
25	Residencial Islamar 3		38°32′26″N 0°08′59″W	104 (341)	28	2010	Residential	Tallest buildings completed in Benidorm in the 2010s.
26	Sunset Waves I		38°32′22″N 0°08′57″W	101.5 (333)	29	2021	Residential	
27	Sunset Waves II		38°32′22″N 0°08′54″W	101.5 (333)	29	2021	Residential	
28	Las Terrazas de Benidorm 1		38°32′38″N 0°08′56″W	101 (331)	30	2005	Residential	
29	Las Terrazas de Benidorm 2		38°32′41″N 0°08′57″W	101 (331)	30	2005	Residential	
30	Hotel Port Benidorm		38°32′03″N 0°06′22″W	101 (331)	26	2026	Residential	
31	Torre Doscalas		38°31′51″N 0°09′53″W	100.4 (329)	32	2004	Residential	
32	Gemelos 22 Torre 1		38°32′20″N 0°06′22″W	100.2 (329)	32	2003	Residential	
33	Gemelos 22 Torre 2		38°32′20″N 0°06′25″W	100.2 (329)	32	2004	Residential	

== Tallest under construction or proposed ==
=== Under construction ===
The following table includes buildings under construction in Benidorm that are planned to be at least 100 m (328 ft) tall as of 2026, based on standard height measurement. The “Year” column indicates the expected year of completion. Buildings that are on hold are not included.

Name	Height m (ft)	Floors	Year	Purpose	Notes
TM Tower	230 (750)	64	2028	Residential	Will become the tallest building in Benidorm and the tallest residential building in Spain when completed.
Gran Delfín	158 (518)	44	—	Residential	
Torre Poseidón	103 (338)	30	2026	Hotel	

=== Proposed ===
The following table includes approved and proposed buildings in Benidorm that are expected to be at least 100 m (328 ft) tall as of 2026, based on standard height measurement. The “Year” column indicates the expected year of completion. A dash “–“ indicates information about the building’s height, floor count, or year of completion is unknown or has not been released.

Name	Height m (ft)	Floors	Year	Status	Notes
Torre Eólica	120	30	—	Proposed	

== Timeline of tallest buildings ==
Name	Image	Years as tallest	Height m (ft)	Floors	Notes
Torre Coblanca		1969–1985	94.5 (310)	31	
Torre Levante		1985–2002	120 (390)	35	
Gran Hotel Bali		2002–2021	186 (610)	52	
Intempo		2021–present	202.5 (664)	47	

== See also ==
- List of tallest buildings in Barcelona
- List of tallest buildings in Madrid
