= List of tallest buildings in Spain =

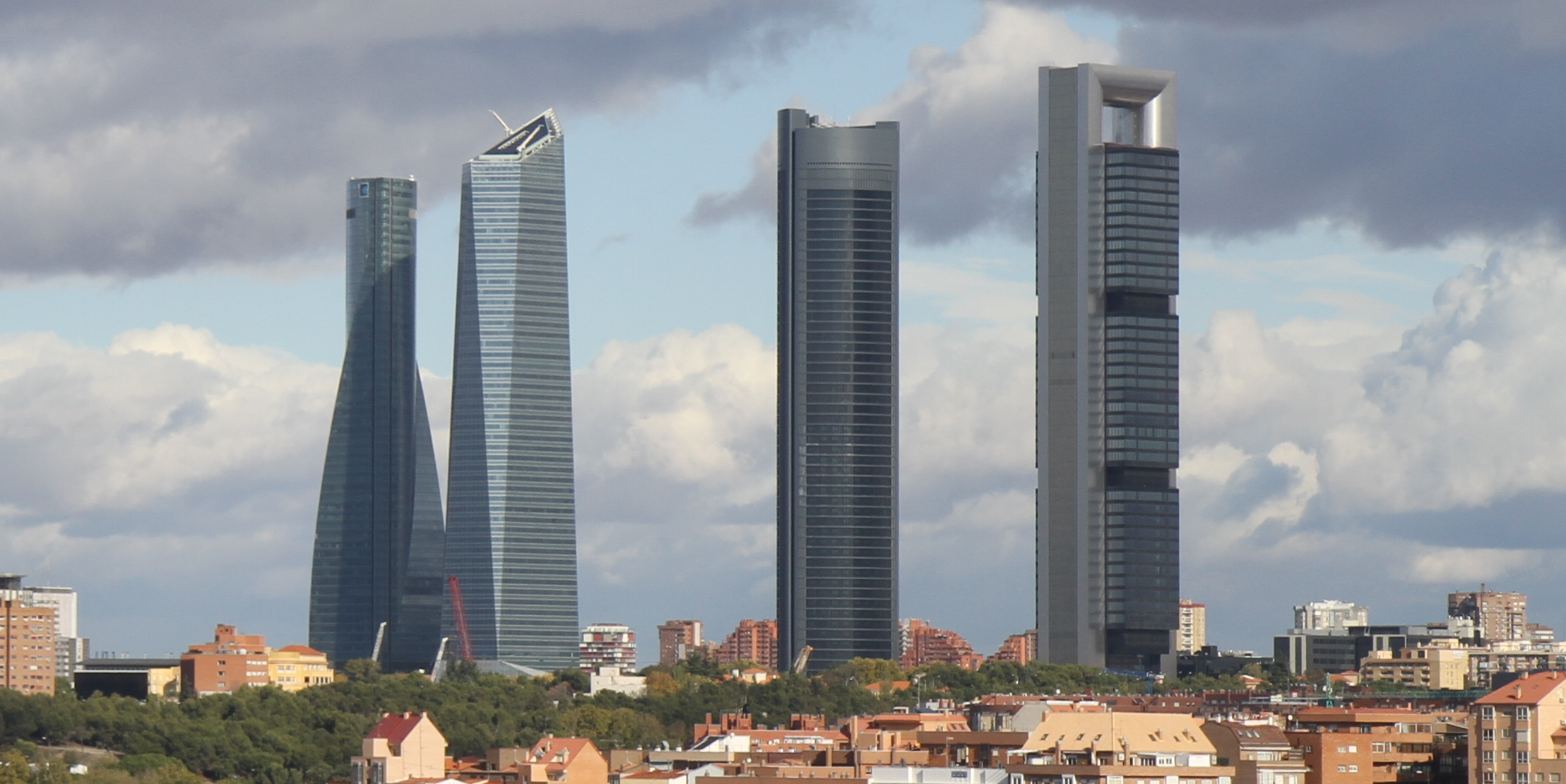
Cuatro Torres Business Area, a business district in Madrid that houses the four tallest skyscrapers in Spain.

Since 2008 the tallest building in Spain has been the 250 metres (820 ft) tall Torre de Cristal in Madrid. In recent years the number of skyscrapers in Spain has significantly grown. Of the buildings in this list, just 18 were completed before the year 2000 with all others being completed after that year.

For a list of the tallest architectural structures in Spain, which are not classified as buildings, like chimneys, towers and masts, see list of tallest structures in Spain.

== Tallest completed buildings in Spain ==
This list ranks all finished buildings in Spain that stand at least 100 metres (330 ft) tall. This includes spires and architectural details but does not include antenna masts. An asterisk (*) indicates that the building is still under construction, but has been topped out.

Was the tallest building in Spain upon completion

Rank	Name	City	Image	Height (m)	Height (ft)	Floors	Year	Notes
1	Torre de Cristal	Madrid		249	817	50	2008	
2	Torre Cepsa	Madrid		248.3	815	49	2008	
3	Torre PwC	Madrid		236	774	52	2008	
4	Torre Emperador	Madrid		230	750	56	2008	
5	Residencial Intempo	Benidorm		202.5	664	47	2021	
6	Gran Hotel Bali	Benidorm		186	610	52	2002	
7	Caleido	Madrid		181	593	36	2021	
8	Torre Sevilla	Sevilla		180.5	592	40	2016	
9	Torre Iberdrola	Bilbao		165	541	40	2011	
10	Torre Lúgano	Benidorm		158	518	43	2007	
11	Torre Picasso	Madrid		157	515	43	1988	
12=	Torre Mapfre	Barcelona		154	505	44	1992	
12=	Hotel Arts	Barcelona		154	505	43	1992	
14	Sunset Sailors I	Benidorm		151	495	41	2026	
15	Neguri Gane	Benidorm		148	486	40	2001	
16	Torre Glòries	Barcelona		144	475	35	2004	
17	Torre de Madrid	Madrid		142	466	34	1957	
18	Edificio Kronos	Benidorm		140	459	41	2008	
19	Universidad Laboral de Gijón	Gijón		130	426	17	1956	
20	Benidorm Beach	Benidorm		126	413	37	2023	
21	Edificio Don Jorge	Benidorm		124	407	36	2008	
22	Mirador del Mediterráneo	Benidorm		123	404	32	2006	
23=	Torre de Santa Cruz I	Santa Cruz de Tenerife		120	394	35	2004	
23=	Torre de Santa Cruz II	Santa Cruz de Tenerife		120	394	35	2006	
23=	Torre Levante	Benidorm		120	394	36	1985	
26	Torre Europa	Madrid		120	393	30	1985	
27	Torre Hercón	A Coruña		119	389	31	1975	
28=	Estudiotel Alicante	Alicante		117	384	35	1962	
28=	Hilton Valencia	Valencia		117	384	35	2006	
28=	Edificio España	Madrid		117	384	25	1952	
28=	Torres de Colón	Madrid		117	381	1976: 23 2024: 30	1976 2024	
32	Costa Blanca 1	Benidorm		116	381	36	1993	
33=	Habitat Sky	Barcelona		115	378	31	2008	
33=	Torre de Francia	Valencia		115	377	35	2002	
33=	Miragolf Playa 2	Benidorm		115	377	33	2005	
36=	Torre Ikon	Valencia		114	374	29	2023	
36=	Gemelos 26 Torre 1	Benidorm		114	374	33	2009	
36=	Gemelos 26 Torre 2	Benidorm		114	374	33	2009	
36=	Torre D'Oboe I	Benidorm		114	374	31	2009	
36=	Torre D'Oboe II	Benidorm		114	374	31	2009	
36=	Gate of Europe I	Madrid		114	374	33	1996	
36=	Gate of Europe II	Madrid		114	374	26	1996	
36=	Hotel Porta Fira	L'Hospitalet de Llobregat		114	374	27	2010	
44=	Sunset Sailors II	Benidorm		113	370	31	2025	
44=	Torre Realia BCN	L'Hospitalet de Llobregat		113	370	24	2009	
44=	Torre Martiricos 1	Málaga		113	370	30	2023	
47	Sol de Poniente 2	Benidorm		112	367	33	2005	
48	El Barco, Alicante	Alicante		111	364	30	1963	
49=	Edificio Colón	Barcelona		110	361	28	1970	
49=	Diagonal Zero Zero	Barcelona		110	361	25	2011	
49=	Beni Beach	Benidorm		110	361	35	1996	
52=	Hotel Princess	Barcelona		109	358	26	2004	
52=	Torre Puig	Hospitalet de Llobregat		109	358	22	2013	
54	Torre Martiricos 2	Málaga		108	354	30	2023	
55=	Torre de La Rosaleda	Ponferrada		107	351	30	2009	
55=	Castellana 81	Madrid		107	358	31	1981	
55=	Torre Werfen	L'Hospitalet de Llobregat		107	358	25	2009	
58	Torre Zaragoza	Zaragoza		106	347	30	2022	
59=	Edificio Playa Azul	Benidorm		105	344	34	2002	
59=	Torre Laguna	El Ejido		105	344	30	2008	
59=	Torre Pinar	Benidorm		105	344	30	2004	
59=	Miragolf Playa 1	Benidorm		105	344	30	2005	
59=	Suitopia Sol y Mar	Calpe		105	344	30	2017	
59=	Hesperia Tower	L'Hospitalet de Llobregat		105	344	28	2006	
59=	Renaissance Barcelona Fira Hotel	L'Hospitalet de Llobregat		105	344	26	2012	
59=	Torre Yaiza I	Las Palmas de Gran Canaria		105	344	28	1972	
67=	Antares Barcelona	Barcelona		104	341	27	2021	
67=	Sunset Waves I	Benidorm		104	341	29	2021	
67=	Sunset Waves II	Benidorm		104	341	29	2021	
67=	Diagonal Mar i Cel	Barcelona		104	341	27	2016	
67=	Torre Titania	Madrid		104	341	23	2011	
67=	Torre Inbisa	L'Hospitalet de Llobregat		104	341	25	2010	
67=	Torre Islamar II	Benidorm		104	341	31	2010	
67=	Torre Islamar III	Benidorm		104	341	31	2010	
67=	Gemelos 22 (I)	Benidorm		104	341	33	2002	
67=	Gemelos 22 (II)	Benidorm		104	341	33	2002	
77	Bizkaia Dorrea	Bilbao		103	338	33	2020	
78=	Hotel Port Benidorm	Benidorm		102	335	26	2026	
78=	Las Terrazas de Benidorm (I)	Benidorm		102	335	33	2005	
78=	Las Terrazas de Benidorm (II)	Benidorm		102	335	33	2005	
78=	Torre Doscalas	Benidorm		102	335	32	2003	
78=	Atrium Beach Mar	Villajoyosa		102	335	28	2002	
83=	Coblanca 41	Benidorm		101	331	30	2007	
83=	Torres de Hercules	Los Barrios		101	331	21	2009	
85=	Torre Complejo Cuzco	Madrid		100	328	25	1979	
85=	Hotel Torre Catalunya	Barcelona		100	328	25	1970	
85=	Skyline Torre I	Madrid		100	328	25	2022	
85=	Skyline Torre II	Madrid		100	328	25	2022	

== Tallest under construction or proposed ==
=== Under construction ===
Name	City	Height (m)	Height (ft)	Floors	Scheduled completion
TM Tower	Benidorm	230	754	64	2029
Sagrada Família	Barcelona	172	564	1	2033
Torre Panorámica Entrenúcleos	Seville	120	393	24	2026
Anbotto Dorrea	Bilbao	119	390	36	2026
Oria Vision	Madrid	110	361	26	2028

=== Approved ===
Name	City	Height (m)	Height (ft)	Floors	Scheduled completion
Torre Chamartín I	Madrid	240	787	54	2030
Torre Chamartín II	Madrid	160	525	42	2030
Gran Delfin Private Residences & Hotel	Benidorm	158	518	44	2028
Hotel Málaga-Port	Málaga	144	380	27	-
Torre Adequa	Madrid	100	328	25	2028

=== Proposed ===
Name	City	Height (m)	Height (ft)	Floors	Scheduled completion
Torre Madrid Nuevo Norte 1	Madrid	330	1082	77	2030
Torre Madrid Nuevo Norte 2	Madrid	265	869	-	2030
Torre Madrid Nuevo Norte 3	Madrid	240	787	-	2030
Torre Madrid Nuevo Norte 4	Madrid	180	590	-	2030
Torre eólica	Benidorm	120	394	30	-
Torre Metropolitan	Madrid	120	394	31	-
Torre BBK en Zorrozaurre	Bilbao	104	341	22	-

== Timeline of tallest buildings ==
Name	Image	City	Years at tallest	Height (m)	Height (ft)	Floors
Edificio del Banco Pastor en La Coruña		A Coruña	1925-1928	38	125	11
Palacio de la Prensa		Madrid	1928-1929	58	190	14
Edificio Telefónica		Madrid	1929-1953	88	289	14
Edificio España		Madrid	1953-1957	117	384	25
Torre de Madrid		Madrid	1957-1988	142	466	34
Torre Picasso		Madrid	1988-2002	155	515	43
Gran Hotel Bali		Benidorm	2002-2007	186	610	52
Torre Espacio		Madrid	2007-2008	224	755	56
Torre de Cristal		Madrid	2008-present	249	817	50

== See also ==
- List of tallest buildings in Barcelona
- List of tallest buildings in Benidorm
- List of tallest buildings in Valencia
- List of tallest buildings in Madrid
- List of tallest buildings in Las Palmas
- List of tallest buildings in Canary Islands
- List of tallest structures in Spain
- List of tallest buildings in Europe
