= List of tallest structures in Spain =

A list of the tallest structures in Spain. This list contains all types of structures.

Structure	Year built	Structural type	City/Town	Pinnacle height (m)	Pinnacle height (ft)	Coordinates	Remarks
Torreta de Guardamar	1962	Guyed mast	Guardamar del Segura	380 m	1246 ft	38°4′18.84″N 0°39′52.65″W	radio tower of Spanish Navy
Endesa Termic	1974	Chimney	As Pontes de García Rodríguez, Galicia	356 m	1168 ft	43°26′29″N 7°51′45.50″W	
Chimney of Teruel Power Plant	1981	Chimney	Teruel	343 m	1125 ft	40°59′49.85″N 0°22′50.3″W	Demolished in February 2023
Chimney 1 of Compostilla II Power Station	1965	Chimney	Cubillos del Sil	290 m	951 ft	42°36′46.8″N 6°33′45.62″W	
Torre de Collserola	1992	Tower	Barcelona	288.4 m	946 ft	41°25′2″N 2°6′51″E	partially guyed
Chimney 2 of Compostilla II Power Station	1965	Chimney	Cubillos del Sil	270 m	886 ft	42°36′41.58″N 6°33′58.31″W	
Majadahonda transmitter, main mast	1962	Guyed Mast	Majadahonda/Las Rozas	264 m	866 ft	40°29′6.85″N 3°52′27.66″W	used for broadcasting on 585 kHz
Torre de Cristal	2007	Skyscraper	Madrid	249 m	817 ft	40°28′41″N 3°41′14″W	
Torre Cepsa	2007	Skyscraper	Madrid	248 m	815 ft	40°28′31″N 3°41′16″W	
Dos Hermanas transmitter	?	Guyed mast	Dos Hermanas/Los Palacios	244 m	801 ft	37°12′35.12″N 5°55′33.75″W	medium wave transmitter, according to air traffic obstacle list at 37°12′52″N 5°55′35″W, real position: 37°12′35.12″N 5°55′33.75″W, used for broadcasting on 684 kHz
Chimney of Soutu de la Barca Power Station	?	Chimney	Tinéu	239 m	784 ft	43°17′31.7″N 6°23′35.71″W	
Torre PwC	2007	Skyscraper	Madrid	236 m	774 ft	40°28′35″N 3°41′17″W	
Casa Cerro transmitter	?	Guyed mast	Casa Cerro	232 m	761 ft		according to air traffic obstacle list at 37°12′36″N 5°52′34″W, but there is no tall structure. Demolished? Planned?
Torre España	1982	Tower	Madrid	231 m	758 ft	40°25′13″N 3°39′51″W	
Chimney of Los Barrios Power Plant	1985	Chimney	Los Barrios	230 m	755 ft	36°10′54.98″N 5°25′11.05″W	
Chimney of Térmica de Aboño	?	Chimney	Carreño	225 m	738 ft	43°33′13.22″N 5°43′18.56″W	
Torre Espacio	2007	Skyscraper	Madrid	223.1 m	732 ft	40°28′44″N 3°41′12″W	
La Catalítica	?	Chimney	Muskiz	222 m	728 ft	43°19′42″N 3°7′1″W	
Palau de Plegamans Transmitter	?	Guyed mast	Palau de Plegamans/Riera de Caldes	217 m	712 ft	41°33′33.04″N 2°11′21.15″E	used for broadcasting on 576 kHz and 738 kHz
Playa de Las Américas Transmitter	?	Guyed mast	Playa des Las Americas	216 m	709 ft		according to air traffic obstacle list situated at 28°03′24″N 16°43′53″W, but Wikimapia shows no tall structure. Demolished military radio station?
Gran Hotel Bali	2002	Skyscraper	Benidorm	210 m	689 ft	38°31′54″N 0°9′50″W	
Almendra Dam	1970	Dam	Almendra	202 m	663 ft	41°16′16.5″N 6°19′11.9″W	
Solar Tower Manzanares	1989	Solar Tower	Manzanares	200 m	656 ft	39°02′34.45″N 3°15′12.21″W	destroyed
Tibidabo Radio Mast?	?	Guyed mast?	Tibidabo	200 m	656 ft		According to air traffic obstacle list at 41°25′36″N 2°07′07″E, however Wikimapia shows nothing, print error?
Central Tèrmica, Sant Adria de Besos	1976	Chimney	Sant Adria de Besos	200 m	656 ft	41°25′35.44″N 2°14′3.95″E; 41°25′36.87″N 2°14′5.96″E; 41°25′38.13″N 2°14′7.79″E	
Central Térmica de Meirama Chimney	?	Chimney	Lousa de Arriba	200 m	656 ft	43°10′2.78″N 8°24′38.02″W	according to air traffic obstacle list situated at 43°09′56″N 8°24′46″W
Central térmica de La Robla Chimney	1984	Chimney	La Robla	200 m	656 ft	42°47′31.37″N 5°38′5.16″W	
Central térmica Litoral de Almería Chimney	1984	Chimney	Carboneras	200 m	656 ft	36°58′41.98″N 1°54′17.74″W	
Chimney of Soto de Ribera Power Station	?	Chimney	Ribera de Aribo	200 m	656 ft	43°18′41.42″N 5°52′24.34″W	
Central térmica de Sabón Chimney	1972	Chimney	Arteixo	200 m	656 ft	43°19′49.46″N 8°30′10.17″W	
Central térmica del Narcea Chimney	?	Chimney	Tineo	200 m	656 ft	43°17′32.3″N 6°23′35.89″W	

== See also ==
- List of tallest buildings in Spain
- List of tallest buildings in Madrid
- List of tallest buildings in Barcelona
- List of tallest buildings in Valencia
