= Neguri Gane =

148 meter-skyscraper located in Benidorm, Spain

Coordinates: 38.5445°N 0.1214°W

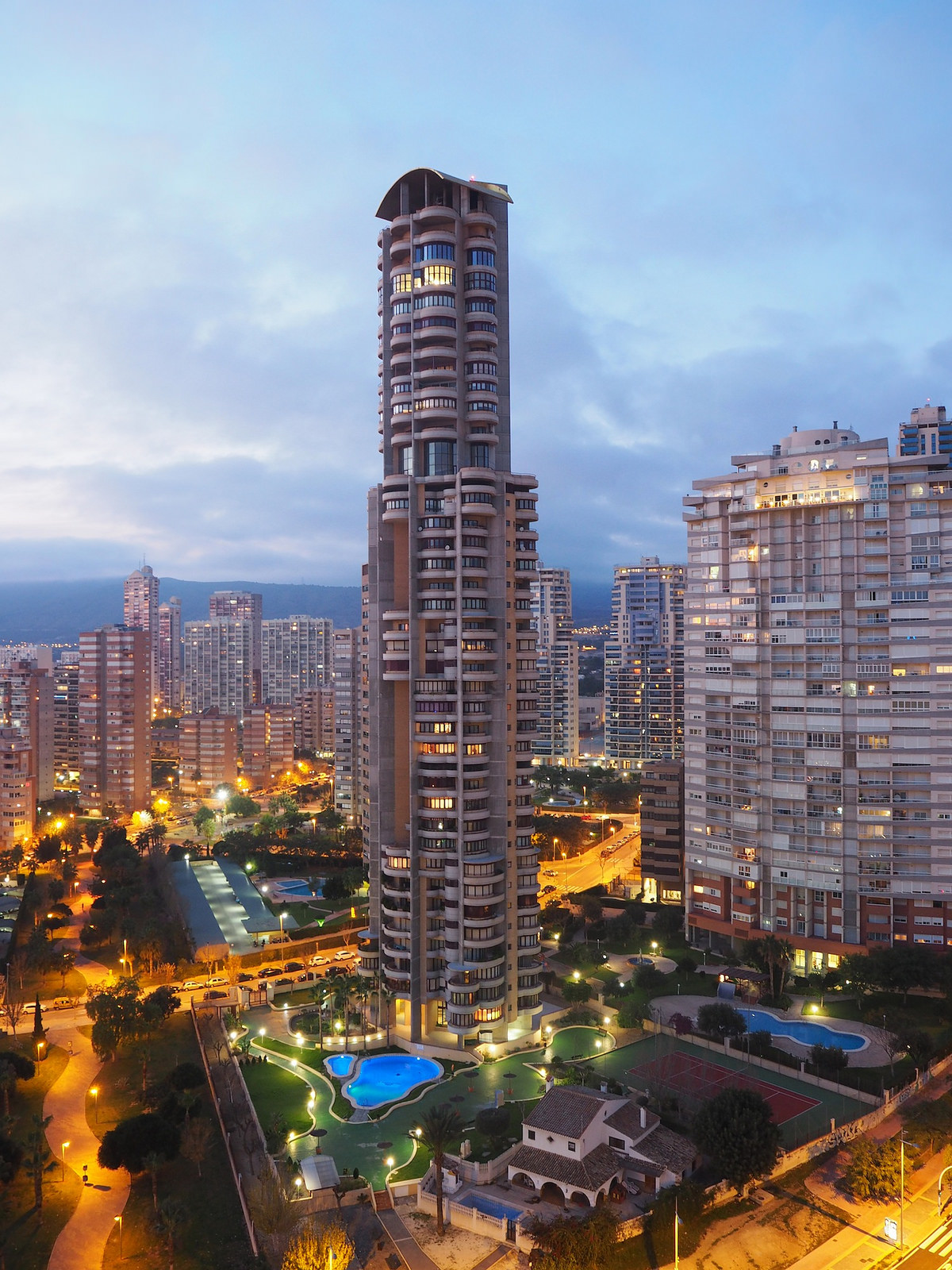
- Interactive map of the Neguri Gane area

General information
- Status: Completed
- Type: Residential
- Location: Benidorm, Spain
- Opening: 2002

Height
- Roof: 486 ft (148 m)

Technical details
- Floor count: 43

Design and construction
- Architect: Perez-Guerras

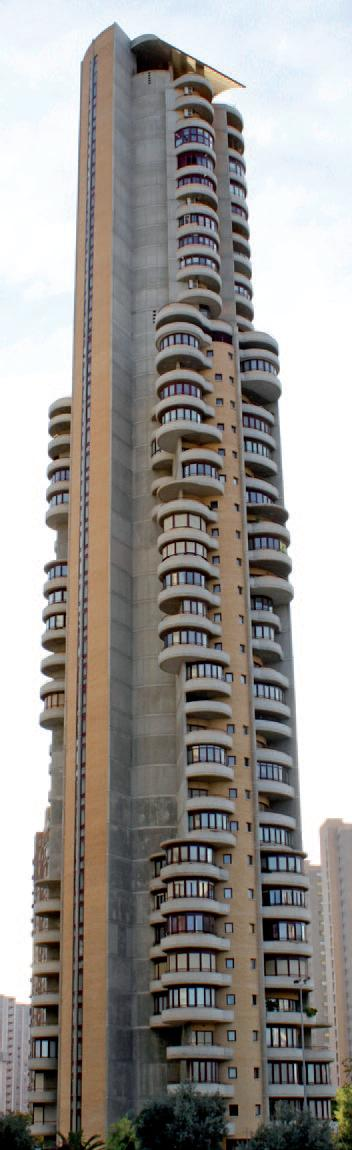
Neguri Gane

Neguri Gane is a 148 meter-skyscraper located in Benidorm, Spain. The 43 story building began construction in 1998, and was completed in 2002. Upon completion it was Benidorm's tallest building, having since been overtaken by the Torre Lúgano, Gran Hotel Bali, and Intempo. The building was completed in the brutalist style. It is named after the Neguri neighborhood of Getxo, in the Basque Country of Spain. It is the 14th tallest building in Spain.

== See also ==
- Skyscraper design and construction
- List of tallest buildings in Spain
