= List of tallest buildings in Las Palmas =

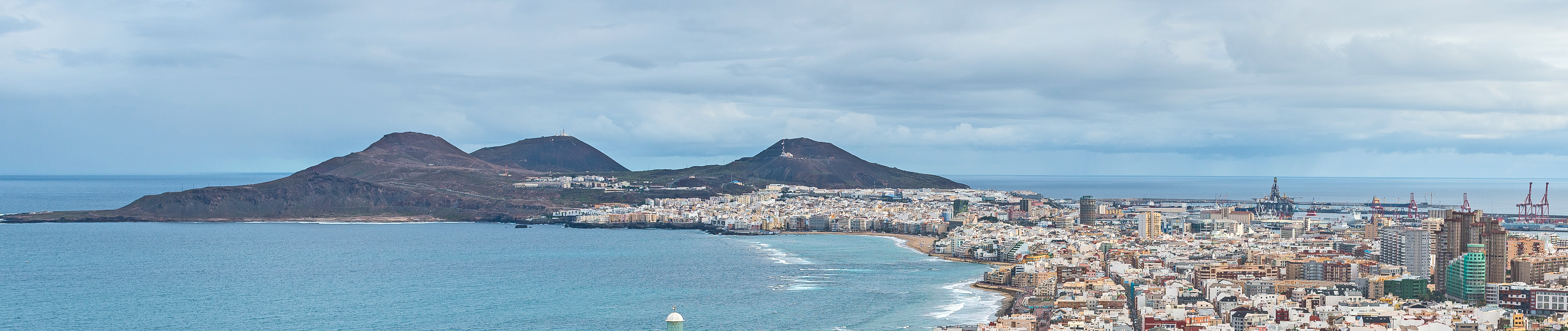
City panorama with the tallest buildings visible

Las Palmas is the ninth-largest city in Spain. Currently, there are 11 buildings over 70 meters tall in the city. The tallest building in the city is Torre Yaiza I, which is also the second tallest in the Canary Islands.

== Tallest buildings ==
The following table lists the tallest buildings in Las Palmas de Gran Canaria that are at least 70 meters (230 ft) tall.

Rank	Name	Image	Height (m)	Floors	Year	Use	Notes
1	Torre Yaiza I		105	27	1972	Residential	
2	Torre Yaiza II		95	25	1972	Residential	
3	AC Hotel Gran Canaria		84	26	1971	Hotel	
4	Edificio Yaiza		84	25	1972	Residential	
5	Edificio Solyvista		77	25	1973	Residential	
6	Torre Woermann		76	18	2005	Mixed-use	
7	Edificio Madera y Corcho 2		75	25	1975	Residential	
8	Edificio Granca		73	24	1969	Residential	
9	Edificio Virgen del Pino I		72	24	1974	Residential	
10	Edificio Virgen del Pino II		72	24	1974	Residential	
11	Edificio América		70	23	1976	Residential	

== Under construction or approved ==
The following table lists buildings that are under construction or have been approved in Las Palmas and are planned to rise at least 70 meters.

Name	Height (m)	Floors	Est. Year	Status	Notes
Santa Catalina Reserve	85	25	2026/27	Under construction	
Torre de la Música	~70	22	—	Approved	

== See also ==
- List of tallest buildings in Spain
- List of tallest buildings in Barcelona
- List of tallest buildings in Madrid
- List of tallest buildings in Valencia
