= Caja Madrid =

Spanish savings bank

- Type: Bank
- Industry: Financial services and Insurance
- Founded: 3 December 1702; 323 years ago
- Founder: Mateo Outerelo
- Defunct: 3 December 2010
- Fate: Merged to form Bankia in 2010
- Headquarters: Torre Caja Madrid, Madrid, Spain
- Key people: Rodrigo Rato (President)
- Products: Consumer Banking; Corporate Banking
- Net income: € 622.3 million (2009)
- Number of employees: 15,279 (2009)

Caja Madrid, formally the Caja de Madrid, headquartered in Madrid, was the oldest of the Spanish savings banks. It was founded on 3 December 1702, by Francisco Piquer Rodilla, an Aragonese priest. Caja Madrid was the regional-owned bank of the Community of Madrid (Comunidad de Madrid).

On 30 July 2010, Caja Madrid signed an agreement to merge with six other savings banks to form Bankia on 3 December 2010. Caja Madrid held a 52.6 percent controlling interest in the new company.

== History ==
The Monte de Piedad de Madrid did not charge interest on its loans until 1836 when a charge was introduced to cover operating costs of the organisation. In 1838, by royal decree, the Caja de Ahorros de Madrid was founded as a savings bank on the British model following the ideas of Jeremy Bentham. Initially the Caja de Ahorros and the Monte de Piedad worked closely together but remained separate institutions.

In 1869 the two institutions were merged and became the Monte de Piedad y Caja de Ahorros de Madrid. Later, to show the importance of the savings side of the operation, the title of the merged institution was reversed and it became the Caja de Ahorros y Monte de Piedad de Madrid.

== Former business ==
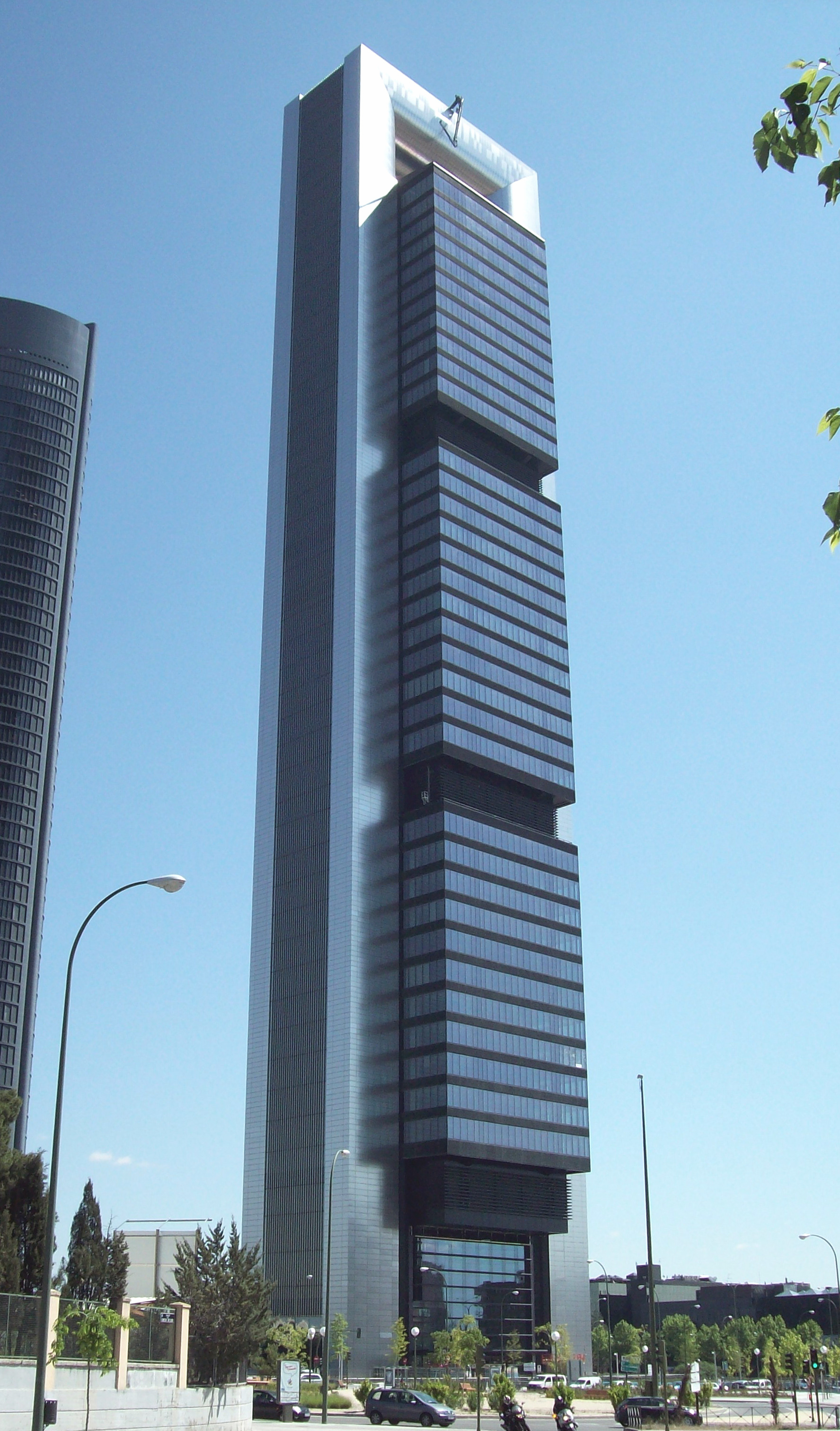
Torre Caja Madrid, was headquarters of Caja Madrid, situated in Fuencarral-El Pardo, Madrid.

Caja Madrid was the fourth largest financial group in Spain, with a turn-over of 180,700 million euros in 2005. It had 12,800 employees in a national network of 1,900 offices, and four foreign branches in Miami, Lisbon, Dublin and Vienna. It also had 330 bank branches within the offices of the insurance company, Mapfre.

Apart from its traditional banking business, Caja Madrid participated in a collection of companies, either directly or via the holding company, Corporacion Financiera Caja Madrid..

== Social responsibilities ==
Caja Madrid carried out social work through two entities that it set up: Obra Social Caja Madrid and Fundación Caja Madrid. These carried out work on its behalf in the fields of social work, teaching, cultural matters and the environment. For example, Fundación Caja Madrid set up La Casa Encendida in Madrid in 2002. In 2005 the amount spent by the two bodies on behalf of Caja Madrid reached 161 million euros. Some of the bank's users criticised it, along with the other Spanish savings banks for having lost its charitable character in the course of developing its business as a bank.

== New headquarters ==
In 2009 Caja Madrid acquired a new headquarters in a newly completed sky-scraper office block known as Torre Caja Madrid (Caja Madrid Tower). The tower had been intended for the Spanish company Repsol, and the principal architect was Norman Foster. The tower is now leased by CEPSA and it is now known as Torre CEPSA. It is situated in the district of Fuencarral-El Pardo in Madrid. The tower has 45 floors and is 250 metres high.

== See also ==
- Bankia
- List of banks in Spain
