= Gran Hotel Bali =

Luxury hotel in Spain

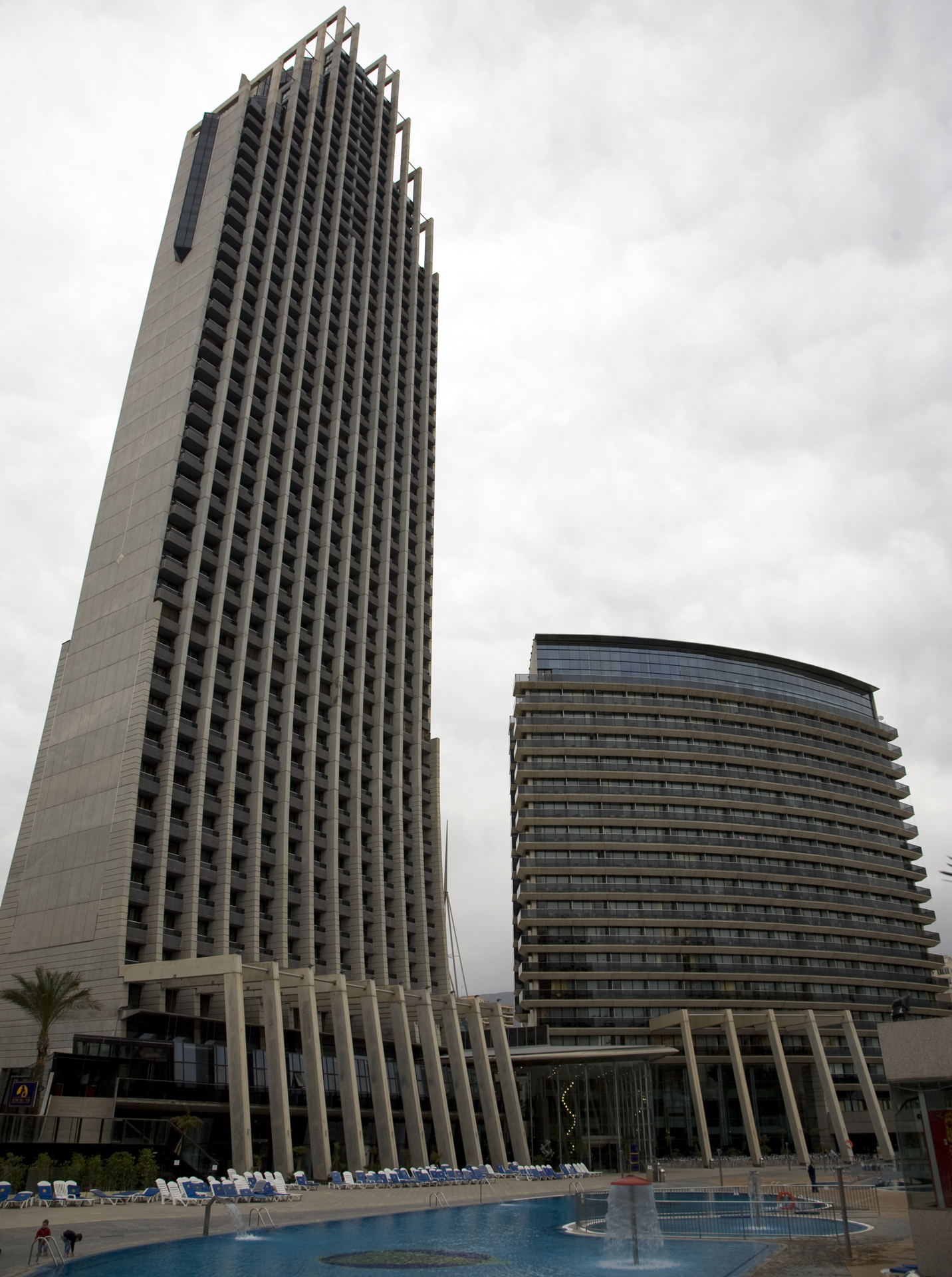
- Gran Hotel Bali, La Cala, Benidorm
- Interactive map of the Gran Hotel Bali area

General information
- Status: Completed
- Type: Hotel
- Location: C/ Luis Prendes, 4 Benidorm, Spain
- Coordinates: 38°31′54″N 0°9′50″W
- Construction started: 1988
- Completed: 2002
- Opening: 17 May 2002
- Owner: Grupo Bali

Height
- Antenna spire: 210 m (690 ft)
- Roof: 186 m (610 ft)

Technical details
- Floor count: 52
- Floor area: 41,170 m^{2} (443,200 sq ft)
- Lifts/elevators: 18

Design and construction
- Architect: Antonio Escario

Website
- Official website

Gran Hotel Bali is a 4-star skyscraper hotel located in Benidorm, province of Alicante, Spain. Built between 1988 and 2002, the tower stands at 186 m (610 ft) tall with 52 floors. It was the tallest building in Spain surpassing Torre Picasso in 2002, until November 2007 when it was overtaken by Torre Espacio. The hotel opened on 17 May 2002.

== History ==
=== Architecture ===
The hotel, which is a set of four buildings, was designed by architect Antonio Escario and has 776 rooms (with capacity for up to 2,000 guests), 18 lifts, gardens and swimming pools. It is located in La Cala de Benidorm, close to the Mediterranean seaside 350 meters from Playa Poniente.

The building has a total height of 186 meters, although the partial construction plan stipulated a height of 210 meters. The four-star hotel has 53 floors (51 above ground and 2 basements), of which 5 are used as technical floors and elevator machine rooms, 1 as a duplex floor for the two upper suites, 1 as a viewing platform, and the remaining 43 for lounges and mezzanines, with a total of 440 rooms. It cost 90 million euros.

The Gran Hotel Bali, located in La Cala de Benidorm, began construction on June 20, 1988, with a budget of approximately 2 billion pesetas, and its structure was completed ten years later. From that point, the fitting-out and decoration phase began, with the hotel's facilities distributed across two buildings. The second building (19 stories) housed the original Hotel Bali, which had existed before the construction of the 53-story skyscraper. It is worth noting that the owner of the Gran Hotel Bali is Joaquín Pérez Crespo, the group's principal shareholder.

The hotel has computer systems to prevent catastrophes: fireproof materials, windows that open automatically to let out smoke, doors that close by themselves to prevent the passage of fire and a computer device capable of alerting technicians without human intervention.

The Gran Hotel Bali belongs to the Bali group, which also owns two other hotels in Benidorm, one on each of the two beaches. These are the Cabana and the Benidorm Center hotel, a three-star establishment and a four-star hotel, respectively.

The project director, architect Antonio Escario, founding partner of Escario Arquitectos, has worked alongside a team of collaborators who designed a reinforced concrete structure for this hotel, calculated by the Florentino Regalado & Associates Engineering Studio for a total built area of more than 40,000 square meters.

You can go up to its viewpoint via a panoramic elevator (the viewpoint costs three euros for customers and six for non-customers).

=== Usage ===
The hotel hosts an annual stair climb race to the viewpoint. In the first edition in 2003, Australian Paul Crake ascended in 4 minutes and 35 seconds. This record remained unbeaten for eleven years until 2014 when Ángel Llorens, a 43-year-old firefighter, achieved a time of 4 minutes and 33 seconds. In 2016, Christian Riedl recorded a time of 4 minutes and 20 seconds.

The first BASE jumping championship, Spain Base 08, was held in 2008, and since 2009 it has hosted the Base Jump Extreme World Championship, the first world BASE jumping championship, which starts each year at the Gran Hotel Bali and travels to various cities around the world in search of the best jumpers.

Since its inauguration in 2002, it has hosted the Grand International Chess Festival.

In October 2010, Moroccan tightrope walker Mustafa "Danger" achieved a Guinness World Record after traveling by motorbike the more than 500 meters separating the Tossal de La Cala and the Gran Bali hotel on a steel cable, at an average height of 150 meters.

The national foosball championship also takes place every year, held during the month of May.

== Media impact ==
In 1993, the half-built building (they were up to about the 30th floor) appeared in the film Golden Balls directed by Bigas Luna and starring Javier Bardem. It also appears in the science fiction film The Possibility of an Island, by French director Michel Houellebecq, released in 2008.

== See also ==
- List of tallest buildings in Spain
- List of tallest buildings in Benidorm

Records
Preceded by Torre Picasso	Tallest building in Spain; 2002–2007; 186 metres (610 ft)	Succeeded by Torre Emperador
Preceded by Neguri Gane	Tallest building in Benidorm; 2002–2021; 186 metres (610 ft)	Succeeded by Intempo
