= Intempo =

Residential skyscraper in Benidorm, Spain

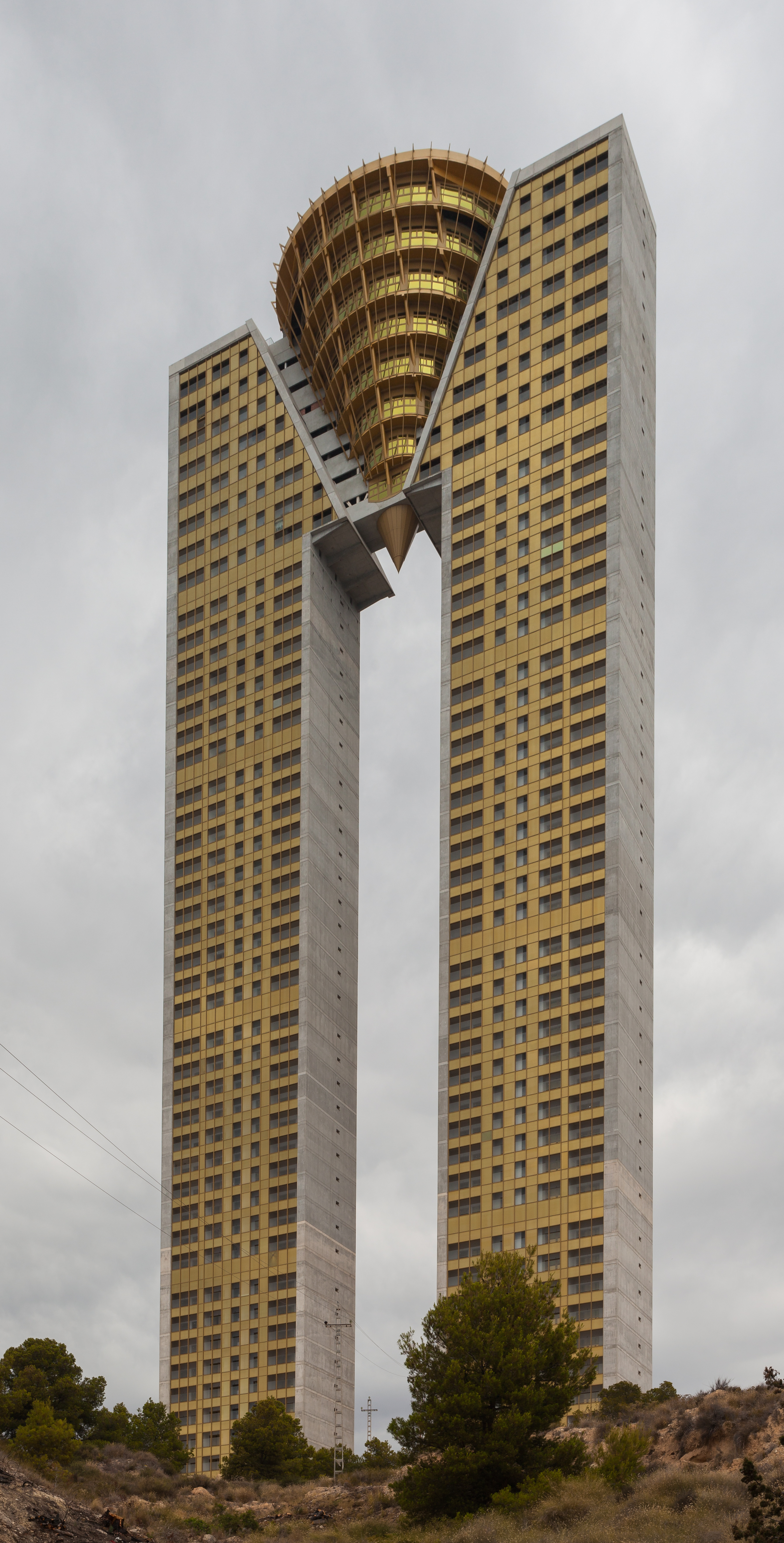

General information
- Status: Completed
- Location: Via Parque, Benidorm, Spain
- Coordinates: 38.5381°N 0.1549°W
- Construction started: 2006
- Completed: 2021
- Cost: £72,500,000

Height
- Roof: 202.5 m (664 ft)

Technical details
- Floor count: 47 above ground 3 below ground (55 floors total)
- Floor area: 36,000 m^{2} (390,000 sq ft)

Design and construction
- Architects: Pérez-Guerras Arquitectos & Ingenieros
- Developer: UNIQ Residential
- Structural engineer: Florentino Regalado
- Main contractor: Dragados; Kono Estructuras

Other information
- Number of units: 256

Intempo is a 47-floor, 202.5-metre-high skyscraper in Benidorm, Spain. The design of the building was officially presented on 19 January 2006 and work began in 2007. Originally scheduled for completion in 2009, work was significantly hampered by the economic crisis of 2008 which seriously affected the real estate sector in Spain. Construction was almost completed in March 2014, but the sponsor undertaking the project went into bankruptcy. In 2018, the building was acquired by SVP Global, and was fully finished by mid-2021.

The building is the tallest in Benidorm and the fifth tallest in Spain.

== Project ==
In 2005 a 92-million-euro loan was obtained from Caixa Bank to begin the tower's construction. The building's inauguration was initially scheduled for 2009, then rescheduled to 2011.

The building project was initiated by the developer Olga Urbana, and the design was the work of the Alicante-based architecture firm Pérez-Guerras. The building plans were presented in 2006, and construction began in 2007. At that time, Spain was experiencing a real estate bubble, and completion was initially projected for mid-2010. However, due to the onset of the financial crisis and the emergence of numerous problems, both financial and technical, it was delayed for several years. Furthermore, several aspects of the initial design underwent modifications due to a lack of foresight, the innovative structural elements, and the complexity of the project. The structure was finally completed in March 2012.

The original developer entered administration in 2014. The majority creditor then became the Sociedad de Gestión de Activos Procedentes de la Reestructuración Bancaria (Sareb), a public limited company managing assets from bank restructuring, or "bad bank", as the heir to the mortgage loan granted by the defunct savings bank Caixa Galicia. Sareb attempted to recover part of the loan through a full auction of the property after the developer's failed attempts to reach agreements with foreign investors. In April 2018, SVP Global officially acquired ownership of the property through a payment in kind of approximately €60 million. The developer resumed construction in the autumn of 2019 and it was completed in July 2021, fourteen years after it began.

The skyscraper is notable for its peculiar geometric configuration consisting of two parallel straight towers, joined together by an inverted cone with an elliptical base at a height of 150 meters. The structure's fundamental characteristic is its very high slenderness.

=== Building site ===
The building is located on Avenida de Colombia, in the Murtal district, an area colloquially and commonly known as Vía Parque. It is situated at an altitude of 35 meters above sea level and approximately 500 meters in a straight line from Poniente Beach, an area with a lower residential density than Levante Beach. The site occupied by Intempo is part of the urban development plan approved in the 1950s.

== Architecture ==
=== Design ===
The building, which houses a total of 256 apartments, consists of three basement levels plus 52 floors (including five technical floors) in two straight towers—separated by 20 meters—180 meters high above ground level, with a perimeter of 24.15 by 16.7 m (403.3 m² area). The towers are connected at both the first three floors (basements) and the top nine (floors 37 to 45) by an elliptical cone with its apex at the bottom, 30 meters high. This peculiar geometry at the top means that the floor areas of both towers decrease with height, as the floor areas of the cone increase.

The towers' structure is made of reinforced concrete, with the side walls left exposed, interrupted only by a small window on each floor for bathroom ventilation. The front façade is a discontinuous glass curtain wall with golden tones. The façade underwent wind tunnel testing using a scale model and performed well, with the cone-shaped design effectively channeling the wind.

The plot on which the building stands is 12,879 m², of which the Intempo building occupies 6,442 m². The total built area is 36,223 m². The structure of the blocks contains 90 tons of rolled steel and 2,200 tons of corrugated steel. The concrete used in the towers amounts to 23,037 m³ and the floor slabs occupy an area of 43,000 m². The concrete used is capable of withstanding a maximum of 50 MPa in the foundation, in the walls and the supports up to the 15th floor slab, which is reduced to 40 or 30 MPa in the slabs of the upper floors. Due to the building's high slenderness ratio, the floor plan configuration of the apartments, and the small size of the vertical circulation cores, the overall rigidity or indestructibility is explained by both the cantilever effect (lateral shear walls) and the frame effect, developed through the floor slabs, as well as by the stiffening belts located on the four upper technical floors. According to data from the study carried out by Florentino & Regalado, the cantilever effect contributes 50% to the structure's solidity, the frame effect 37%, and finally, the stiffening belts 13%.

=== Height ===
It is the tallest building in the city of Benidorm (surpassing the Gran Hotel Bali), the tallest in Spain outside Madrid, one of the tallest in the world in a city of less than 100,000 inhabitants, the tallest residential structure in Spain, and the tallest residential building in the European Union. Initially, the building's height was 187 meters above ground level but after its completion in 2021, a new floor slab was added, reaching a height of 202.50 m. This height is still pending approval by the CTBUH.

=== Structure ===
The building consists of two parallel towers separated by a gap of 20 metres (66 ft) and connected by a cone-shaped structure between floors 38 and 44. Its frontal view, vaguely resembling the number 11 and the letter M, has led commentators to speculate about a possible reference to the terrorist attacks of 11 March 2004 in Madrid. It is one of the few skyscrapers in the world which has the shape of an arch (another in Europe being the Grande Arche in Paris). The façade of the building is of glass, a first for a residential building in Benidorm.

=== Preliminary designs ===
According to initial renderings of the building, a continuous curtain wall was planned for the front façade (it would have been the first building in Benidorm with this feature), but this idea was ultimately discarded, and transparent glass railings were installed on the terraces to leave them open. Similarly, the cone was originally intended to be a smooth, circular pyramid, but it was ultimately given a stepped configuration. Regarding the elevators, the architect's initial idea was to install a model that did not require a machine room, a common feature in 20-story buildings, but unfeasible for this skyscraper. This deficiency, noted by the construction company Kono, was remedied by adding an extra floor slab—number 56—consisting of two small coffers on either side to house the elevator machine room, which are not visible in the original plans or in the developer's promotional images.

== Facilities ==
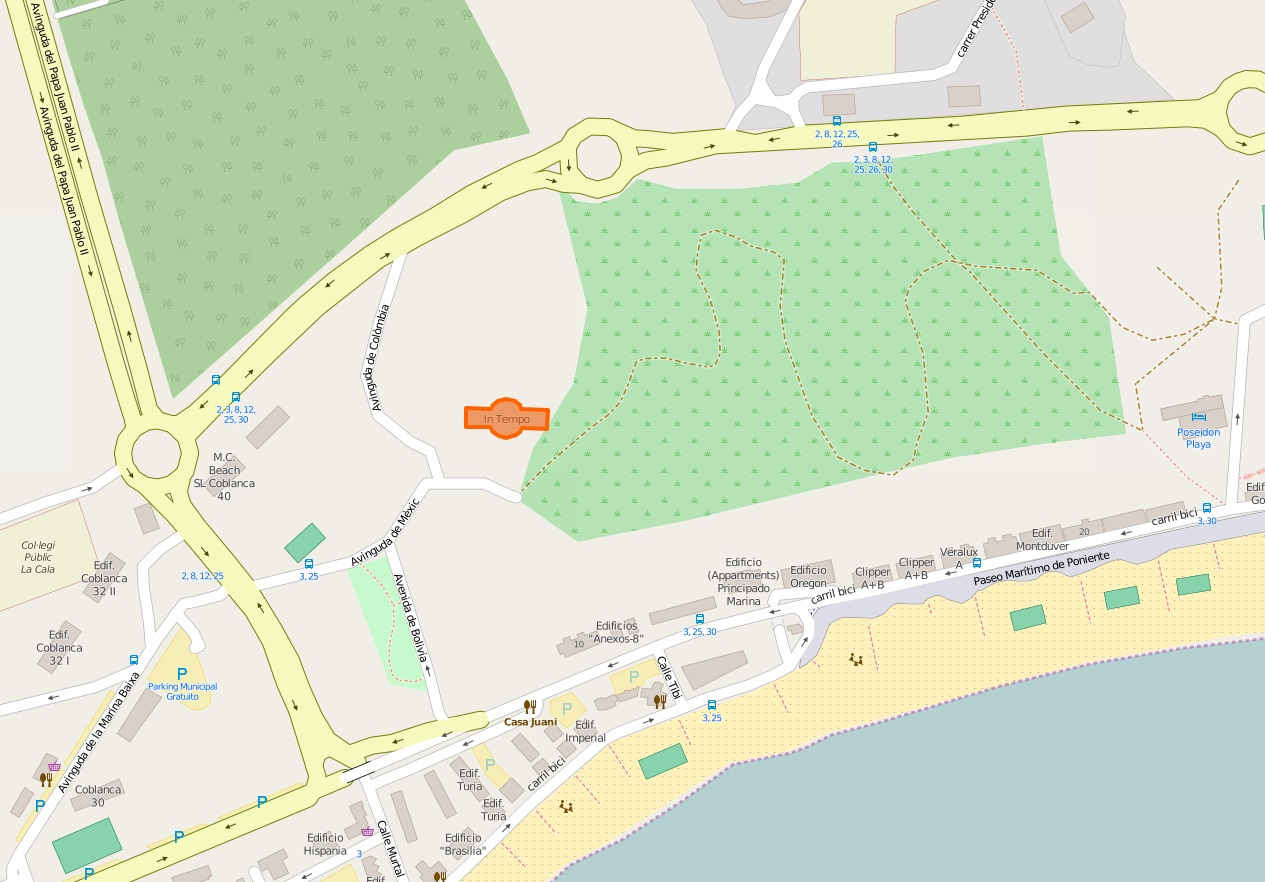
Location of Intempo on Poniente beach in Benidorm.

From the 38th floor upwards, the features of the apartments will be adaptable to the owner's needs. Outside, it will have two swimming pools —one semi-Olympic and one for children— landscaped and recreational areas, a solarium, and sports facilities with a spa, gym, and sauna. The building has three basement levels with a total of 389 parking spaces, as well as storage rooms and lockers.

The slight incline at the entrance is overcome by a staircase, with a row of palm trees on either side, and a small panoramic elevator. The building's apartments are accessible by a total of six elevators, three per tower (two standard elevators and one freight elevator). The elevators are capable of ascending from the third basement level to the 45th floor in 55 seconds, at a speed of 4.2 meters per second, making them the fastest in a residential development in Spain.

=== Elevators controversy ===
In August 2013, the US edition of the blog Gizmodo published the false claim that the building's architects had not planned for an elevator. The story was subsequently picked up by numerous media outlets, both national and international. (Note: Antena 3, Nació Digital, y La Gaceta de Salamanca. Los medios internacionales como ZDnet (grupo CBS), CNN, New York Daily News, Corriere della Sera, The Independent, The Huffington Post, Libération, Bild, Focus, N24, Neue Zürcher Zeitung, Der Spiegel, Stern, Die Welt, Sankei Shimbun, y Yomiuri Shimbun)

This was however a mistranslation arising from a news article in the Spanish newspaper El País on July 20, 2013, which discussed the construction of the Intempo building, plagued by business and financial problems against the backdrop of the Spanish real estate crisis. The article stated that "the elevator shaft had not been taken into account", with this referring to the space that houses the elevator machinery rather than the elevator itself.

The first media outlet to question the veracity of the news was the technology blog Microsiervos, providing, among other evidence, links to the building plans that clearly showed the shafts for the two elevators and the freight elevator for each tower, and even photos of the enormous elevator control panel found on the blog of a journalist who had climbed to the top of the building. The rumor was quickly denied by those responsible for the project, via Twitter and local radio, and even by Sareb.

== History ==
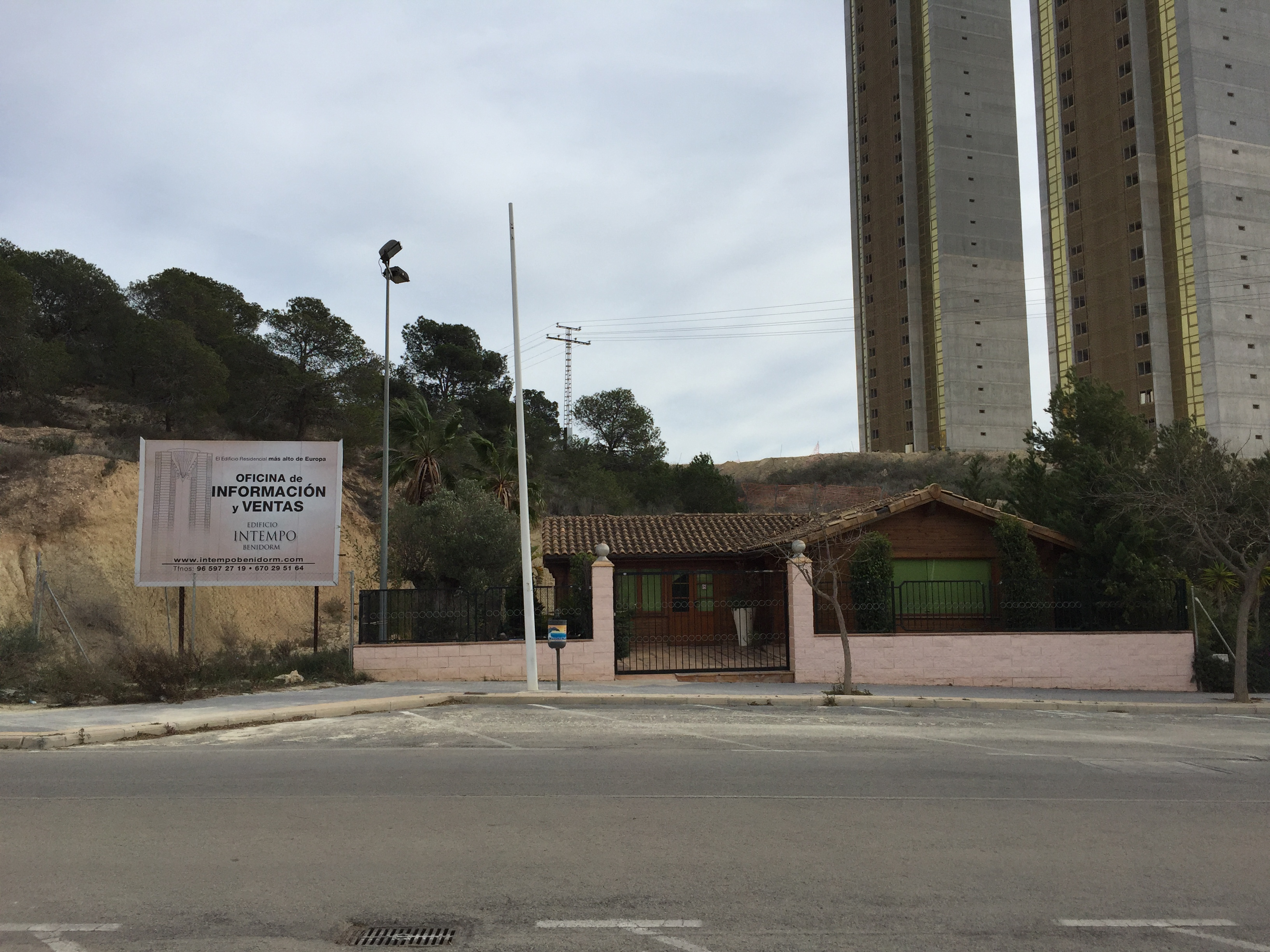
A sales booth behind the building site

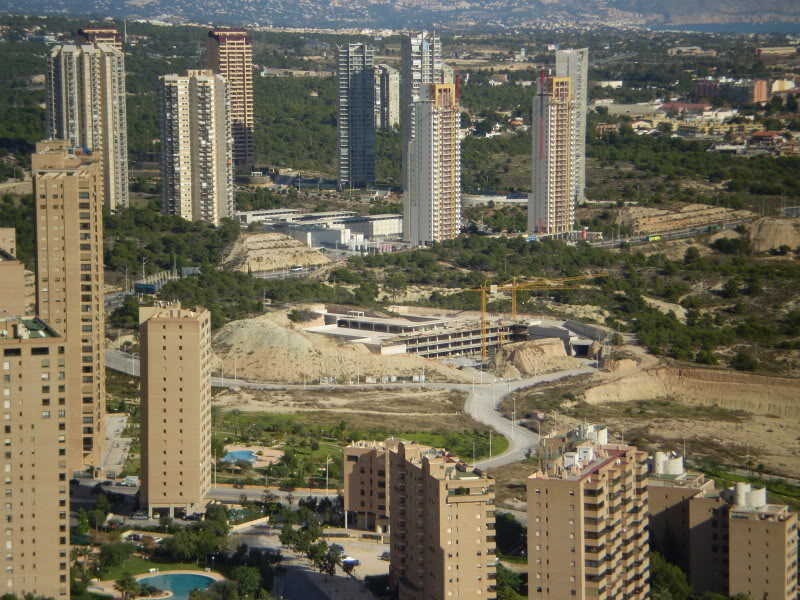
The finished underground levels and the foundations of the towers. Below, some brown buildings, the Coblanca complex, can be seen; in the background, located on Vía Parque, are the residential complexes Terrazas de Benidorm, Sol de Poniente, Miragolf, and Islamar.

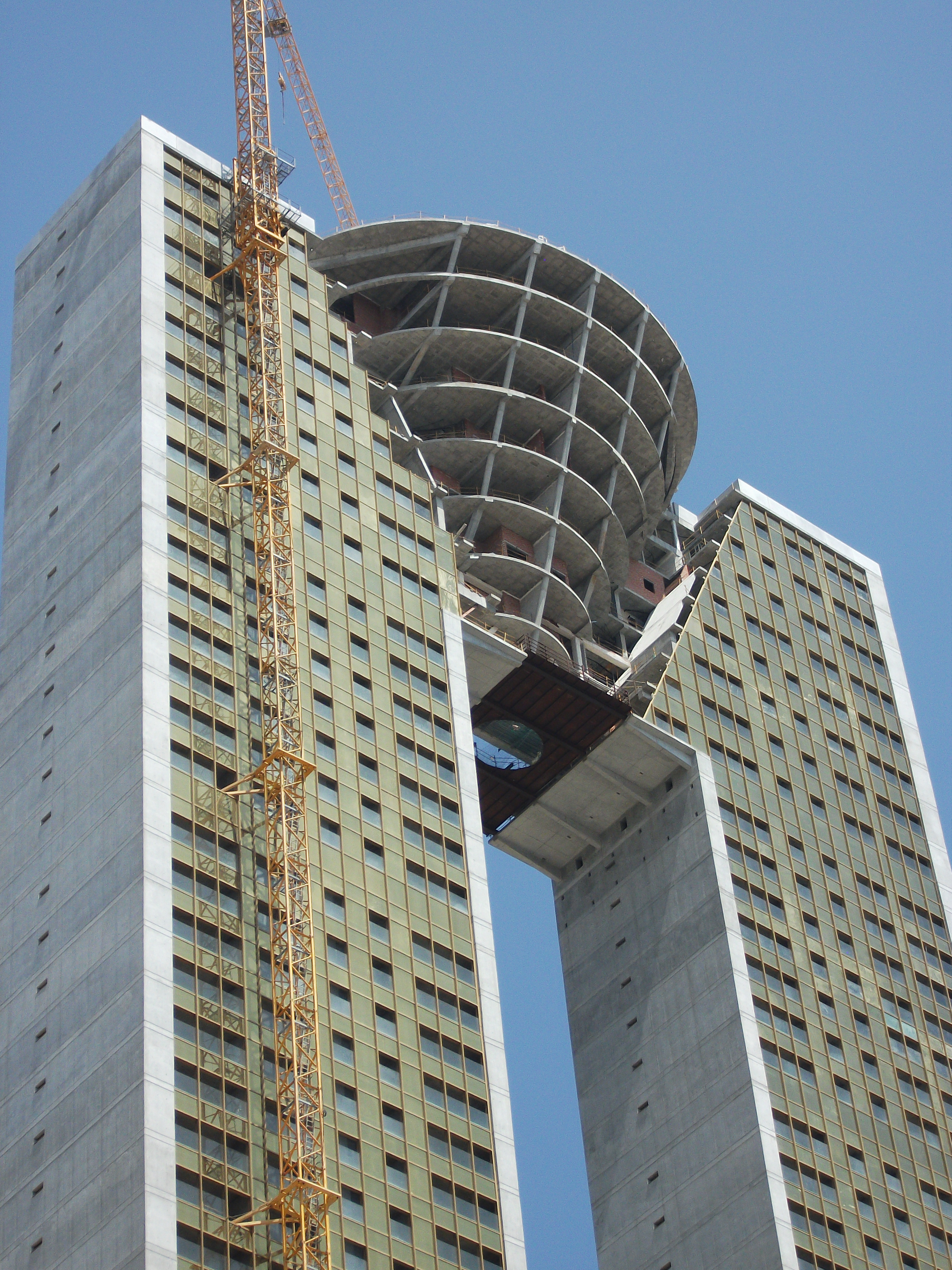
The tower cone

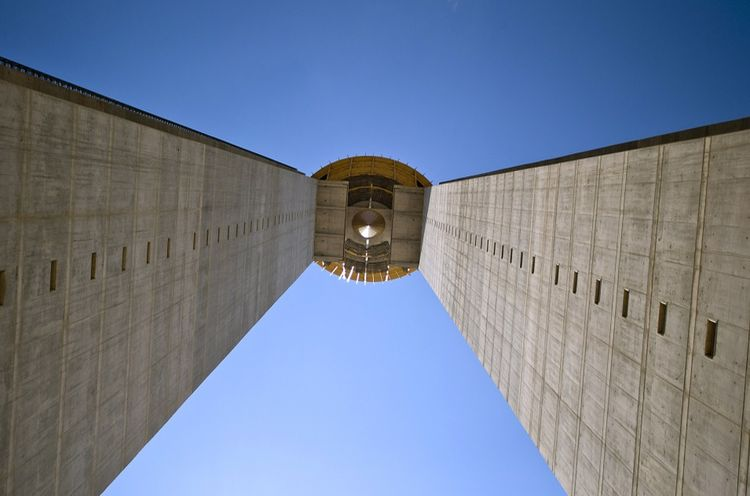
The cone visiboe from below

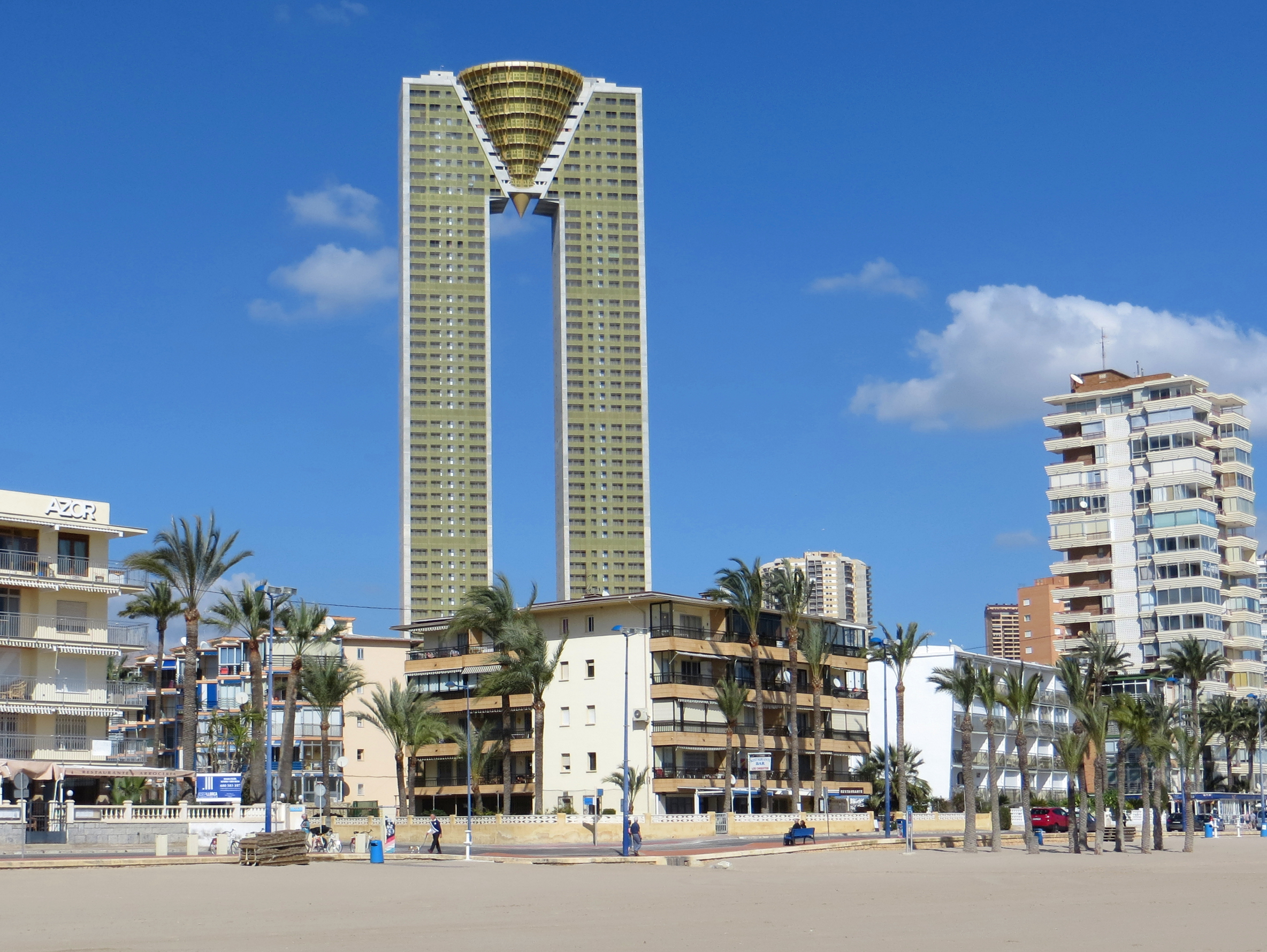
the tower seen from the Playa de Poniente

The construction of the project was accompanied by numerous setbacks, which caused the opening date, initially planned for mid-2010 and with a construction period of 40 months, to be postponed several times. The project was presented on January 19, 2006, and construction work began on May 2, 2007.

=== Origin of the design ===
The building was designed by the Alicante-based architecture studio Pérez-Guerras, with the collaboration of the Benidorm-based studio Olcina & Radúan Arquitectos and the concrete structure by Florentino Regalado & Asociados.

Some sources, when the initial designs were presented, saw in the design a tribute to the victims of the March 11, 2004 Madrid train bombings, known by the numeronym 11-M, as the towers could be interpreted as two facing ones forming the letter 'M'. The architect explained that it was not his intention to create a tribute, but that he "doesn't dislike the idea at all." He added that when he designed Intempo, "little had passed since the attack, and I was very aware of it because I entered a competition to build a monument in the same area as the attack, but I only received an honorable mention." Indeed, at the end of 2004, a few months after the attacks took place, the Pérez-Guerras architecture studio received a runner-up prize of 6,000 euros in the competition to design the monument in homage to the victims of 11-M located in front of the Atocha station.

=== Financing ===
The developer of the property is Olga Urbana SL, a company founded by three individuals in 2004 (Note: Los tres socios de Olga Urbana SL son el empresario vasco José Ignacio de la Serna de Grupo Arcentales, Isidro Boronat de Coblanca y el hotelero Juan Fuster.) with an initial share capital of just 3,100 euros. In 2005, Caixa Galicia granted it a loan of 93 million euros for construction, secured by a real estate mortgage. It was later revealed that the developing partners contributed a total of seven million euros. That year, Caixa Galicia closed the fiscal year with a profit of 212.3 million euros—almost double that of 2004—and allocated almost 20 billion euros to loan investments, 35% more than the previous year.

Due to the bankruptcy of Caixa Galicia, the mortgage loan, amounting to 92 million euros, was initially assumed by Nova Caixa Galicia, and finally in December 2012, Sareb, a bad bank, took it over through a stake of approximately 52 million euros, absorbing a 50% debt reduction, not taking into account the subsequent 11 million euro surcharge applied to the debt. 55% of Sareb's capital is privately held, while the remaining 45% is held by the Fund for Orderly Bank Restructuring (FROB).

=== Construction ===
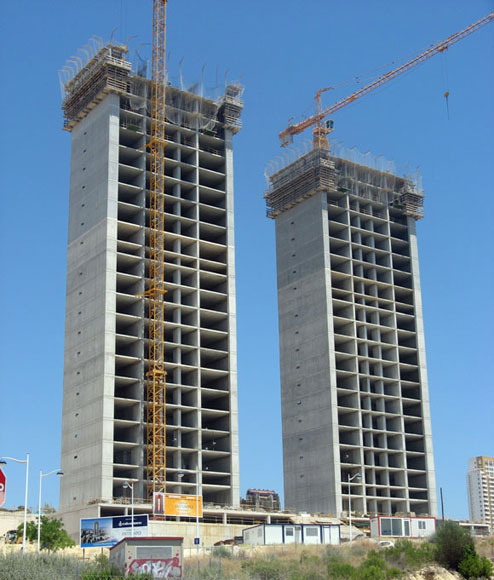
The site in June 2010

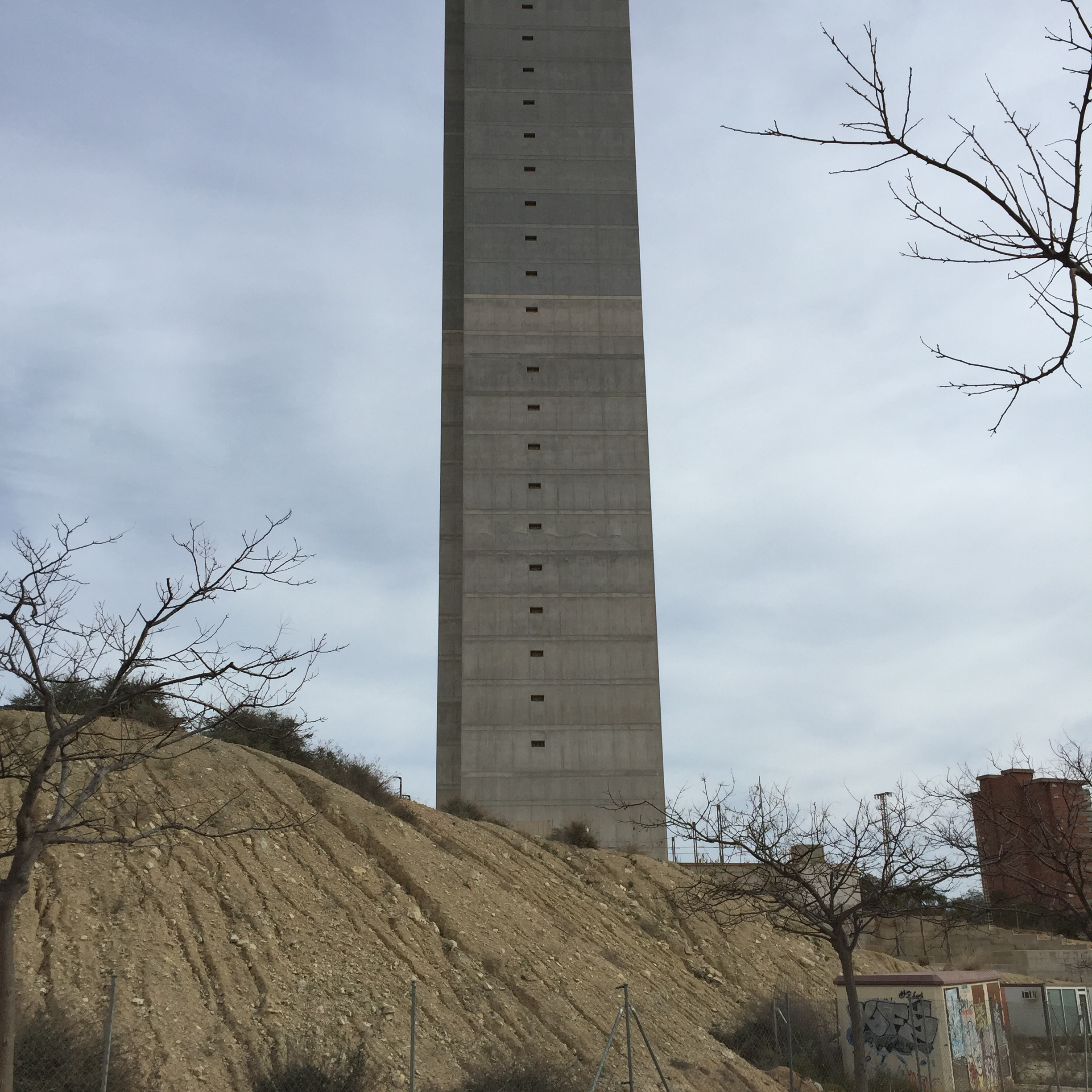
The change in color of the concrete can be observed from the 11th floor onwards due to the change between construction companies.

Olga Urbana acquired the land on which the skyscraper would be built from Aurelio González Villarejo in 2005 for 54.3 million euros, as recorded in a public deed. Some sources stated that the costs associated with the project had initially been estimated at between 45 and 50 million euros, however, when the project was actually presented in 2005, they were valued at 96 million euros.

In February 2007, site preparation work began for the foundations, consisting of excavations and the construction of retaining walls to prevent landslides. Between July 2007 and March 2008, the three basement levels for parking were constructed, leaving a central void for the towers. In the garage area, separated from the tower structure, waffle slabs with reusable coffers or formwork panels 35 cm thick were used (to reduce weight and allow for greater spans between columns), along with solid slabs of the same thickness in areas that would support the earth fill.

The building sits on a nine-meter-thick layer of weathered marl, measured from the third basement level. This marl was sufficient to support the loads of the garage area, which were addressed with isolated footings; however, it was not capable of withstanding the demands placed on the towers. Therefore, a foundation was chosen based on the installation of a total of 144 piles, 1500 mm in diameter and 12 meters deep, reaching a depth of one meter in sound limestone bedrock. These piles were connected by a 2.5-meter-thick pile cap slab. The reinforcement of the pile cap slab took place in September 2008, leaving a space for the elevator shaft. The piloting was carried out simultaneously with the construction of the garage basements between November 2007 and April 2008.

On September 30, more than 4,000 cubic meters of concrete were poured into the foundation slab of one of the two blocks, to cover almost 744,000 kilograms of steel. Two pumps were used, plus a third in reserve, and a concrete mixer truck was poured every 5 minutes in a process that lasted eighteen hours. From June to November 2009, the first eleven floors (up to the 17th floor) were built using a climbing formwork system. From March 2010 to April 2011, the remaining floors (up to the 47th floor) were completed.

In July 2011, the two buildings were joined in two phases. First, a 5.5-meter cantilever was installed on floor slab 46 at a height of 143.5 meters on both sides of the tower, requiring the construction of auxiliary metal platforms on the floor slab immediately below. This cantilever provided a base on which to support the lower floor slab of the cone. Second, two parallel metal trusses, each with a 20-meter span and an 8-meter depth (two stories) and weighing 110 tons, were installed on each tower. Due to their weight, the trusses were surface-welded and then lifted into place. They form the base of the cone upon which the upper floors are built. A metal truss and waffle slab were chosen to reduce weight. The cone structure features two types of supported pillars, some straight and others that follow the cone's generatrix, responsible for supporting the weight of the floor slabs.

The inverted cone located in the central part of the building was completed in June 2012, and the flag-raising ceremony finally took place on July 15, 2012, once the structure was complete, ten months behind the planned date of September 2011. The two cranes, each about 200 meters tall, were removed in June 2014.

=== Bankruptcy of the construction company ===
In July 2009, due to the financial crisis, the construction company, Estructuras Aliben, filed for a temporary workforce reduction plan (ERE) affecting ninety-nine of its one hundred employees. It subsequently filed for bankruptcy and was eventually liquidated, resulting in the suspension of construction for months. Estructuras Aliben, subcontracted by the Madrid-based company Construcciones Rayet, was hired at the insistence of the Galician savings bank. Later, they decided to terminate the contract, which involved paying compensation of 600,000 euros.

In March 2010, a new company, Kono Estructuras with its registered office in Benidorm, was established and construction work resumed from the 11th floor (floor 17). This company committed to completing the work within eighteen months. In April 2011, when the building already had 46 floors, the plans for the 47th floor were still not available.

On June 24, 2011, thirteen workers were injured when a freight elevator fell from the tenth floor, but there were no further consequences because the emergency braking system activated in time. The freight elevator had been inspected that morning by several technicians and had been operating without problems throughout the day.

=== Resignation of the architects ===
In June 2013, the architectural firms in charge of managing the construction, Pérez-Guerras Ingenieros y Arquitectos Asociados SL and Olcina y Raduan Arquitectos SL, withdrew from the project when approximately 20% of it remained to be completed. According to municipal and developer sources (the architects declined to comment), their withdrawal stemmed from the loss of the necessary trust between client and architect after Sareb imposed financial control of the project on the developer, handing it over to an external project management company called Suasor. They criticized Suasor's decisions, arguing they were driven by economic considerations and believed that the building's structural safety, quality, and future maintenance could no longer be guaranteed, nor could the high standards of the original design be implemented. Suasor received a fixed monthly fee for its services, calculated as a percentage of the savings achieved. This company refused to pay Kono Estructuras, the company responsible for erecting the Intempo structure, over one million euros in outstanding payments for materials, labor, and certifications, and Kono was forced to cease operations. In protest, in 2015, the construction company Kono released a preview of a documentary detailing all the deficiencies the project experienced during construction. Kono reported frequent delays in payments to workers or complete suspension of payments if workers did not have their salaries deposited directly with the lending institution, and they also had to advance money to purchase the materials needed to complete the work.

The remaining 17% was handled by Pablo Moreno Arquitectos Asociados, as stated in the communication from the Alicante Territorial Association of Architects to the Benidorm City Council. In August 2013, in an official statement, the project architects acknowledged that the project was economically unfeasible from the outset. Furthermore, according to the project's technical director, Roberto Pérez-Guerras, the final settlement with Kono was signed on July 3, thus ending the relationship between the two companies, reiterating that there was no outstanding debt to said company. Finally, the architect clarified that the variation in the floor slabs of the elevator booths was due to a change in the elevator supplier. They stated that "it is obvious that by changing suppliers, replacing Orona elevators with the international and prestigious KONE, there would be a minimal change in the height of the floor slabs," and regretted that the Intempo "could not be completed under the initially approved conditions." In August 2013, according to the developers, 94% of the work had been completed.

In mid-2013, investment groups from Russia, the United Arab Emirates, and Sri Lanka expressed interest in acquiring shares in Olga Urbana. In 2014, it was claimed that Trinitario Casanova, owner of Grupo Hispania, had begun negotiations to acquire the building. In September 2015, a Saudi investor expressed interest in acquiring the building. Meanwhile, Roberto Pérez-Guerras, the designer of Intempo, claimed to have initiated talks with more than fifteen potential buyers, both Spanish and foreign. However, the reality is that the negotiations were left to Sareb (the Spanish asset management company) and were conducted in strict secrecy.

=== Olga Urbana's Contest ===
In 2012, José Ignacio de la Serna de la Garma, the majority shareholder of Olga Urbana, was sued for alleged fraud and misappropriation by a buyer who had made down payments totaling €80,000 with the developer's guarantee that these payments were backed by a financial institution. For similar reasons, the developer was also sued by three buyers who had made down payments as deposits. When the apartments were not delivered, they demanded the return of the guarantees, which were not refunded. In April 2014, a hearing was held, which De la Serna did not attend, but another of the three developers, Ignacio Boronat, did. He admitted to the judge that the bank guarantees did not exist and that the money paid by the buyers was used for the construction of the building. Because De la Serna failed to appear in court, a Benidorm court ordered his arrest so he could testify as a suspect. In February 2015, after a long battle with cancer, De la Serna died without seeing his biggest project completed. In addition to Intempo, he promoted several projects in the area, such as Neguri Gane, a 145-meter skyscraper also in Benidorm, completed in 2002. In October 2015, a court ruling declared the clauses established by Caixa Galicia limiting the amount of the guarantee null and void, holding Abanca responsible as its successor.

On November 6, 2014, Sareb requested that the Provincial Court of Alicante place Olga Urbana into compulsory insolvency proceedings. As early as 2008, the last year in which it filed annual accounts, the developer had accumulated losses of €4.06 million and a debt to banks of €62.75 million. Sareb made this decision due to the company's insolvency, which was evidenced by its widespread payment defaults and its inability to finance the construction of the Intempo building on its own. Finally, on November 26, 2014, the developer Olga Urbana SL officially filed for insolvency proceedings, as recorded in the Official State Gazette and the Official Gazette of the Mercantile Registry (BORME). This meant that their powers of administration and disposal were suspended, and the lawyer Antonia Magdaleno Carmona was appointed as insolvency administrator. She belonged to the law firm that handled the liquidations of Martinsa Fadesa, among others. In an official communication, she gave a one-month deadline for the debts to be reported to her in accordance with the Insolvency Law. From the accounting records, the insolvency administration indicated that the developer owed 136 million, 42 million more than the value of its assets, which, in addition to Intempo, included the Edimar IX development, valued at 3.3 million.

As of March 28, 2015, the bankruptcy administration noted that a total of 77 buyers who had paid advances for the purchase of Intempo homes had still not claimed their debts, that the company had eleven current accounts in four banks, all with zero balances, and that the company's cooperation had been nonexistent. Furthermore, it was suspected "whether the 130 million euros in financing received by Olga Urbana was used entirely for the construction of the building or whether part of it may have been diverted to other purposes." In Magdaleno's words, "the company hasn't even appeared in the bankruptcy proceedings, the registered offices don't exist, and the only documentation I've had access to is what I was able to get at a sales office and little else. If you add to that the fact that the company has been closed in the Commercial Registry for failing to file accounts for years, it already gives you an indication of how it has been managed."

Olga Urbana's largest creditor was Sareb, with €108 million, of which €82 million were classified as having special privilege due to a real estate mortgage and €7.6 million corresponded to interest. Sabadell, with €6.8 million, and Abanca (successor to NCG), with €4.1 million, were also listed as creditors. The remaining creditors were mostly companies that worked on the construction of the skyscraper and homebuyers who made advance payments, including both Spanish and foreign nationals. The building's architect, Roberto Pérez-Guerras, was also owed €120,000 in fees. Estructuras Kono sued Sareb, requesting the judge overseeing Olga Urbana's bankruptcy proceedings to convert Sareb's privileged claims into subordinated claims. They argued that Sareb had effectively acted as the de facto administrator of the bankrupt company, and that from the outset, both the financial institution and Sareb had imposed binding conditions. In this way, the remaining creditors could access a portion of the proceeds from the sale of Intempo. Otherwise, the entire amount obtained from the building in any eventual sale (or auction) would go to the semi-public company, leaving even the bankruptcy administrators unpaid.

=== Auction ===
The building's structure and walls are complete, as are the electrical and plumbing installations, but some details remain to be finished, such as the exterior landscaping (gardens and swimming pool), interior partitions, and tiling on some floors. As of May 2016, the project is stalled due to lack of funds, and its apartments are unoccupied.

In April 2014, Sareb decided not to foreclose on the mortgage against Intempo, even though it could contractually do so. The deadline for Olga Urbana to repay the loan expired on January 31 of that year. At that time, Sareb's initial intention was to complete the building, and it invested 11 million euros for this purpose. The developer presented a cost study in mid-2014 to complete the final phase of urbanization, estimated at three million euros. By April 2014, the only solution considered for canceling the mortgage was the sale of the entire building to an investment group, without the possibility of individual apartment purchases by private individuals. Regarding any buyer who paid capital at the beginning of the project, it is not expected that they will be able to keep their apartment.

Finally, on December 4, 2015, Sareb decided that the building would be put up for public auction without a starting price. The decision to sell it in its entirety, rather than by individual units or apartments, was justified by the fact that the construction was not fully completed. The court order approving the plan proposed by the bankruptcy administration included the possibility of transferring the building to the so-called "preferred" creditors in lieu of payment if there were no offers or if the offers were lower than the amount owed to that creditor. Interested parties had to pay 1% of the property's value in advance through a deposit or bank guarantee. One month after the plan's approval, on January 4, the three-month period for submitting proposals began, extendable for another three months. If offers are received for an amount lower than the privilege, creditors with special privilege—primarily Sareb—will be granted a period of ten business days to improve their offer; and if no offers are received, privileged creditors will also be granted a period of ten business days for the adjudication of the asset in payment of the debt.

Its market value amounts to approximately 92 million euros, and the apartments in the building have a price that, according to an appraisal carried out by UVE Valoraciones, would range between 190,990.8 euros and 1.6 million euros. An independent expert study by APUC Activos concluded that the Intempo will hardly be able to be sold for more than 60 million euros, also taking into account that the completion costs of the skyscraper are around five million euros.

In May 2016, two offers were received, one for €47 million and another for €58.5 million (it was revealed in August that Sareb itself was bidding, exercising its right to improve the offer). A US fund offered €50 million, but it did so after the deadline and its offer was rejected. The trial in the insolvency proceedings involving the developer of Intempo, which was scheduled for June 2016, was postponed until October 28 of the same year.

=== Bankruptcy incident and temporary suspension ===
In August 2016, Isidro Boronat, a partner in Olga Urbana, along with Kono Estructuras SL, the company that built the skyscraper's structure, and Pérez Guerras Ingenieros y Arquitectos, the firm of the architect who designed it, filed a bankruptcy incident to have Sareb's debt considered subordinated. The plaintiffs sought to ensure that the "bad bank" (Sareb) would be the last to be paid and could not exercise its right of first refusal in the bidding for the building, arguing that it had effectively managed Olga Urbana SL. On February 17, 2017, the ruling of the Commercial Court of Alicante was made public, dismissing the lawsuit filed by small creditors of the building's developer (Kono Estructuras, Pérez Guerras, among others), siding with Sareb and finding that it had never acted as the administrator of Olga Urbana. Therefore, their bankruptcy claim will retain its privileged status, unless the plaintiffs decide to appeal the judgment. Until the bankruptcy proceedings, which had suspended the property adjudication process, were completed, Sareb would not acquire the property.

On November 6, 2017, the acquisition by Strategic Value Partners (SVP Global) of the mortgage loan encumbering the property for 60 million euros was announced. Sareb thus obtained a capital gain of approximately 10 million euros. On November 7, the Provincial Court of Alicante (which was due to issue its ruling on November 30) announced that the creditors had filed a motion withdrawing their appeal and Sareb had filed a motion agreeing to the terms, thus concluding the proceedings and closing the case.

In April 2018, SVP Global officially acquired ownership of the property through a dation in payment, paying over €60 million. The exact amount has not been made public. An investment of approximately €5 million was reported to complete the construction within an expected timeframe of 12 months. Marketing in Spain and abroad was anticipated to begin around June 2018.

In June 2018, the property development company Olga Urbana was dissolved following the completion of its liquidation phase. The bankruptcy proceedings were declared fraudulent, and the heirs of José Ignacio de la Serna were ordered to pay €17.6 million to Olga Urbana's creditors. However, De la Serna's heir renounced the inheritance.

=== Second attempt: design changes ===
In December 2018, SVP contracted the services of the Catalan developer Uniq Residential, which will be responsible for its completion and marketing, as well as the architect Rafael Robleado, who will redesign the unfinished areas to make them more attractive and facilitate their sale.

In June 2019, the media reported on the "resurrection" of Intempo, and more details of the design changes emerged. Regarding the interiors of the apartments, partition walls were removed and sliding doors were replaced to gain space and light. The vast majority of one-bedroom apartments were replaced with two-bedroom units. The top two floors are dedicated to communal leisure areas accessible to all residents, such as a gym, swimming pool, and hot tub, with the rooftop serving as a chill- out zone. It also features a restaurant exclusively for residents and a 1200 m² terrace. As for the street-level communal areas, the Olympic-size swimming pool and tennis and paddle tennis courts were replaced by a beach-style pool (with varying slopes) and a children's area. The 600 m² entrance hall has a contemporary Art Deco design. The inverted cone is now called a diamond.

The building obtained its building permit in July 2019. Construction began in the fourth quarter of 2019 and was completed in July 2021, with an initial estimated completion date of late 2020. The delay was primarily attributable to the COVID-19 pandemic in Spain. Dragados was the company responsible for resuming construction. On June 22, 2021, the Spanish flag was raised for the second time, this time to commemorate the completion of the works. The apartments have been marketed for prices ranging from €250,000 for ground-floor units in the towers to €1.5 million for the largest apartments located in the cone or diamond.

=== Problems ===
The architects, Pérez-Guerras and Olcina & Radúan, resigned.

While reports that the building did not include elevator shafts were false, poor planning led to unsafe working conditions for the builders, construction outpacing design, and a construction elevator collapse which injured several of the thirteen workers aboard. Efforts to assist these people were hampered by design flaws which did not permit emergency vehicles onto the building site.

== Reception ==
The Intempo building is seen by many analysts as an example of the economic and financial crisis in Spain triggered by the bursting of a housing bubble in 2007. At the start of the project, the construction industry was still in a phase of expansion, marked by significant speculation. Between 2006 and 2008, according to the developers, one hundred apartments had already been sold off-plan, 40% of the total, but in subsequent years only about twenty more were sold. This figure appeared in numerous press releases, and the possibility of continuing construction despite the crisis was even justified by the fact that sufficient funds were available, given that 40% of the apartments had already been sold off-plan. In 2013, it was stated that almost two hundred apartments (75% of the building) remained unsold.

In 2013, Intempo was nominated as one of the best concrete buildings in the world at the FIB (Fédération Internationale du Béton) International Awards, in the building category. It had previously been selected by the Scientific-Technical Association of Structural Concrete (ACHE).

=== Media impact ===
As with the Gran Hotel Bali, the Intempo building has been the site of base jumps, a high-risk form of parachuting, due to its altitude and the absence of nearby obstacles. In 2012, Álvaro Bultó successfully completed several jumps after the structure was finished. However, some jumps have not been authorized, such as the one that took place in June 2014 in the early hours of the morning.

The building was featured in the Spanish Television (TVE) program "España a ras de cielo", presented by Francis Lorenzo, in the second episode of the first season entitled Tú a Mallorca, yo a Benidorm and first broadcast on September 24, 2013, which was watched by 1,869,000 viewers (10.2% audience share).

The building also appears in the opening credits of the eight-part television miniseries Crematorio, produced by Canal+ in 2011, based on the book of the same name by Rafael Chirbes. Accompanied by the song "Cruzando el paraíso" by the singer Loquillo, it appears in the first few seconds when it was in its initial phase of construction, as a paradigmatic example of urban speculation on the Mediterranean coast.

In August 2023, the music video for Myke Towers' song "Bajo El Sol," filmed in the skyscraper, was released.

== See also ==
- List of tallest buildings in Spain
- List of tallest buildings in Benidorm
