= Torre Moeve =

Skyscraper located in the Cuatro Torres Business Area in Madrid, Spain

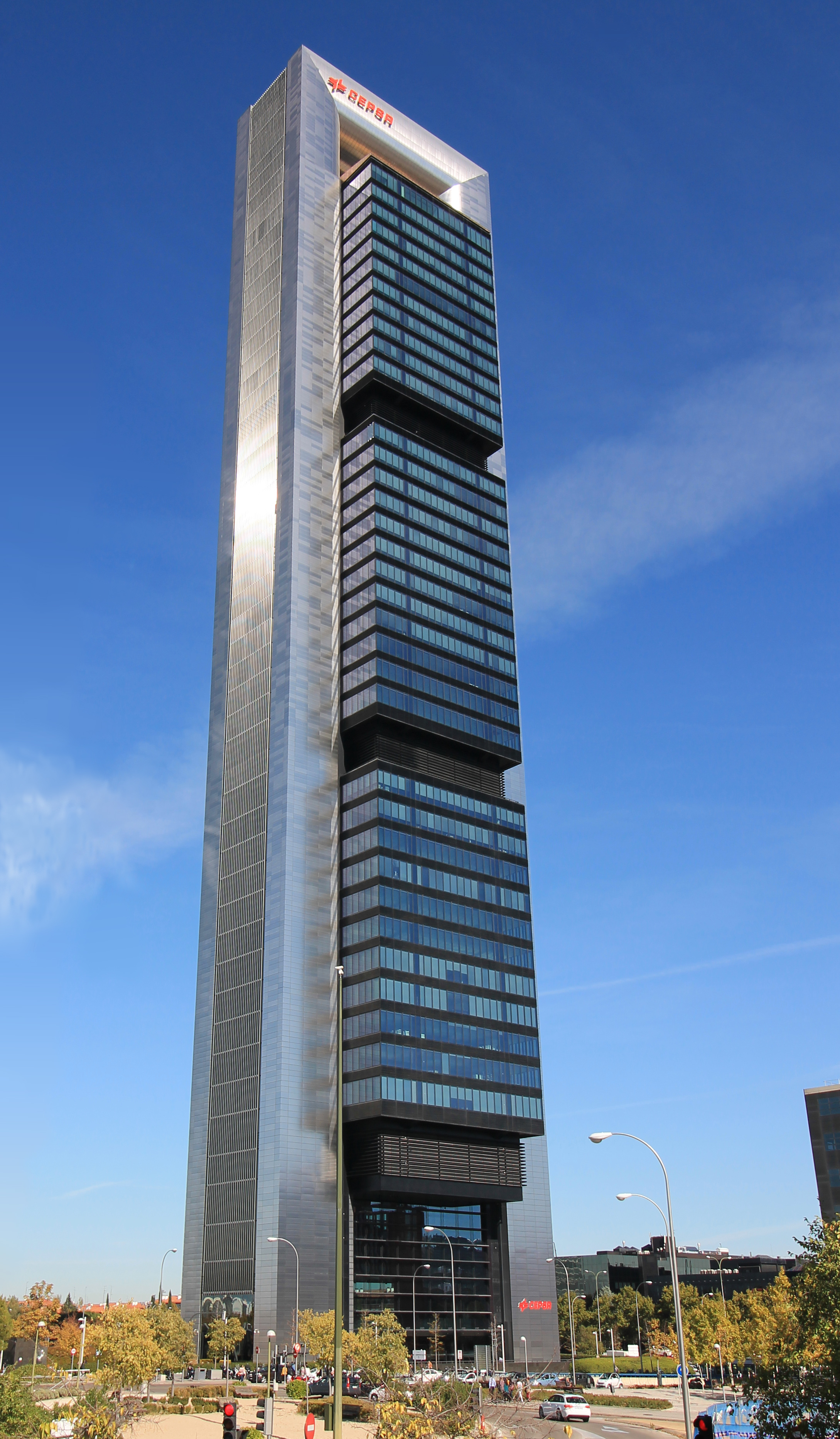
- Torre Cepsa (now Moeve) in October 2017.
- Former names: Torre Repsol, Torre Caja Madrid, Torre Bankia, Torre Cepsa

General information
- Type: Office
- Location: Pº de la Castellana 259, CTBA, Madrid, Spain
- Coordinates: 40°28′32″N 3°41′16″W
- Construction started: 8 October 2004
- Completed: 2008
- Owner: Amancio Ortega
- Operator: Gerens Hill

Height
- Roof: 248.3 m (815 ft)

Technical details
- Floor count: 45
- Floor area: 107,966 m^{2} (1,162,140 sq ft)

Design and construction
- Architect: Norman Foster
- Developer: Repsol YPF
- Structural engineer: Halvorson and Partners; Gilsanz Murray Steficek LLP Engineers and Architects
- Main contractor: FCC and Dragados

Website
- www.fosterandpartners.com/projects/torre-cepsa

The Torre Moeve (English: Moeve Tower) is a skyscraper located in the Cuatro Torres Business Area in Madrid, Spain. With a height of 248.3 m (815 ft) and 45 floors, it is the second tallest building in Madrid and the second tallest in the Cuatro Torres Business Area after Torre de Cristal, which is taller by less than a metre. It is the second tallest building in Spain and the 5th tallest building in the European Union.

It was successively named the Torre Repsol, the Torre Caja Madrid, the Torre Bankia, the Torre Cepsa between 2014 and 2024, and currently the Torre Moeve, depending on which major Spanish company had the lease.

== History ==
Designed by Lord Foster — and this also colloquially referred to as the Torre Foster, — it was built by a joint venture of Dragados and Fomento de Construcciones y Contratas.

The tower was initially known as Torre Repsol and would have served as headquarters for Repsol YPF oil and gas company. During the construction of the tower, Repsol decided to change the location of its future headquarters and the financial institution Caja Madrid purchased the building for €815 million in August 2007.

In 2016 it was bought by Amancio Ortega, Europe's richest man and founder of global fashion group and Zara owner Inditex (ITX.MC), for €490 million euros through his property investment arm, Pontegadea Inmobiliaria, one of the biggest property companies in Spain. He purchased the tower from Abu Dhabi tycoon Khadem al-Qubaisi, whose fund had exercised a last-minute purchase option from Spanish lender Bankia (BKIA.MC), its previous owner.

The current name of the tower refers to the energy company Moeve, previously known as Cepsa, headquartered in the building. It is likely to change its name once again if Moeve goes ahead with the plan to move its HQ to another part of Madrid.

== Ownership ==
The building, intended to be the headquarters of the Repsol oil company, was originally planned to be built on part of the land of the Fourth Reservoir of the Canal de Isabel II, in Plaza de Castilla. The money Repsol would pay for the land was to be used to build a courthouse on the rest of the plot, which would house, among other things, the offices of the High Court of Justice of Madrid. However, claims filed by the reversionaries (the heirs of those whose land had been expropriated to build the reservoir) made the project impossible (instead, the Canal Art Center and a public park were built).

The oil company therefore sought a new location, acquiring at auction one of the plots of land in the future CTBA financial and office complex, located on the grounds where Real Madrid's training complex had previously stood. The first cranes for its construction were erected on October 8, 2004. However, during construction, coinciding with a change in shareholders and chairman, Repsol decided to move its future headquarters to Calle Méndez Álvaro, and thus put this large office space on the market. Subsequently, the financial institution Caja Madrid acquired this building for 815 million euros with the aim of making it its main headquarters in 2009. Later, Caja Madrid merged with Bankia, which entailed another name change. By the end of 2013, office rents in the Madrid skyline had fallen by 40% since the boom years before the bursting of the housing bubble.

In October 2013, Abu Dhabi's sovereign wealth fund IPIC, owner of Cepsa, signed an agreement with Bankia for the oil company to occupy the skyscraper as its headquarters. Bankia would continue to occupy five floors of the building. The lease agreement was established for a period of eight years, renewable annually for another seven years, for a total of €324 million. Refurbishment work was carried out on the tower to adapt it to the needs of the new tenant. In June 2014, the relocation of Cepsa's 1,500 employees to the tower was announced, and was completed by August. At the end of 2014, a Cepsa logo was placed at the top of the building. The agreement included a purchase option for possible exercise in 2016. In February of that year, IPIC stated that it would not exercise it due to the fall in oil prices, but in September it changed its mind and informed Bankia that it would exercise the option for 400 million euros and subsequently transfer it. In September 2016, Amancio Ortega acquired the property for 490 million euros through his holding company Pontegadea. This is the largest transaction that the owner of Inditex has carried out in Spain, exceeding the 400 million euros he paid for the Torre Picasso.

== Technical specifications ==
In 2013, the CTBUH (Council of Tall Buildings and Urban Habitat) certified the exact height of the skyscraper at 248.3 meters after a thorough study of the site and the building plans. Until then, it was believed that the skyscraper reached 250 meters, as stated in the project data from the architectural firm Foster and Partners. This means that the tallest building in Spain is the Torre de Cristal, designed by architect César Pelli, at 249 meters tall.

The 248-meter skyscraper has a total of 49 floors. The entrance lobby is 13.85 meters high, the equivalent of four floors. The building's structure, which weighs 11,000 tons, is made of steel; the facade is primarily covered with glass in the office areas and stainless steel panels in the concrete cores. The floor plan is rectangular.

The lead architect is Norman Foster, in collaboration with other partners. The facilities were developed by Aguilera Ingenieros, SA. Structural engineering was carried out by Halvorson and Partners (Chicago) and GMS (New York), with on-site support from the local firm Arquing. Companies collaborating on the construction include Repsol YPF, Gerens Management, Dragados, FCC, Alatec, Inasus SL, and Folcrá.

=== Design ===
Norman Foster, the British architect and Pritzker Prize winner, designed this structure with two external reinforced concrete cores. Each core contains seven elevators, staircases, and service areas. Between the two distinctive external columns, the floors are arranged in a shelf-like fashion. Three intermediate platforms support between eleven and twelve floors in each case.

== Gallery ==
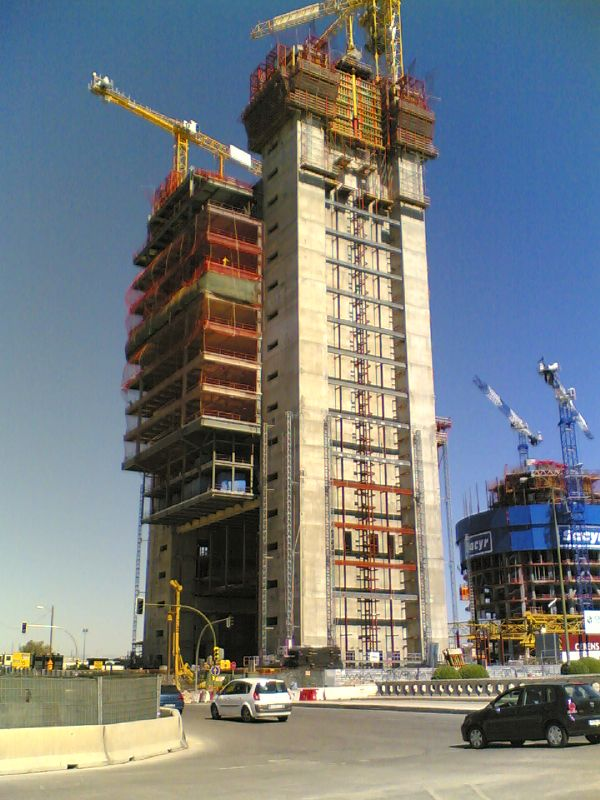
Torre Caja Madrid under construction

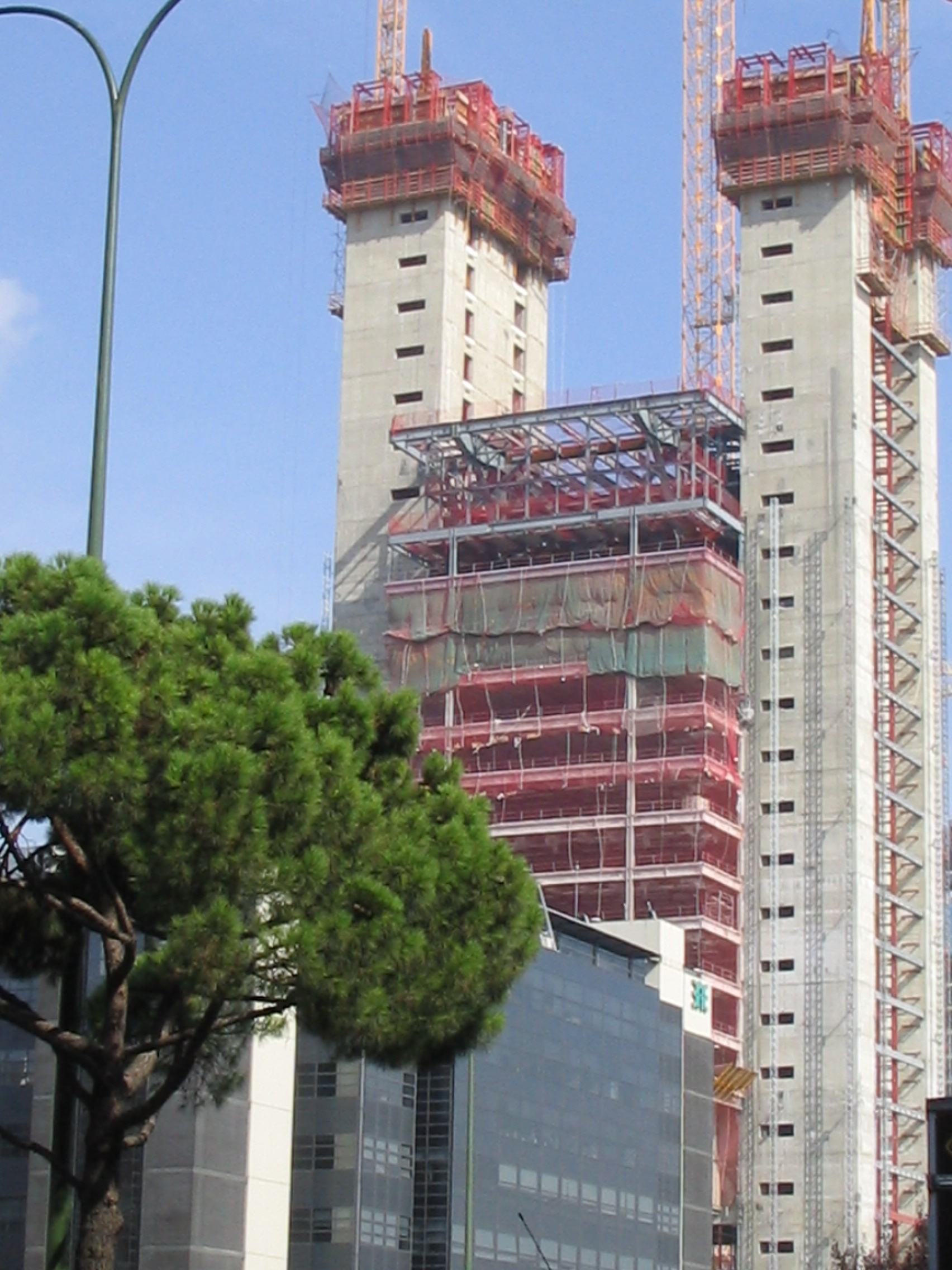
Under construction on May 26, 2006

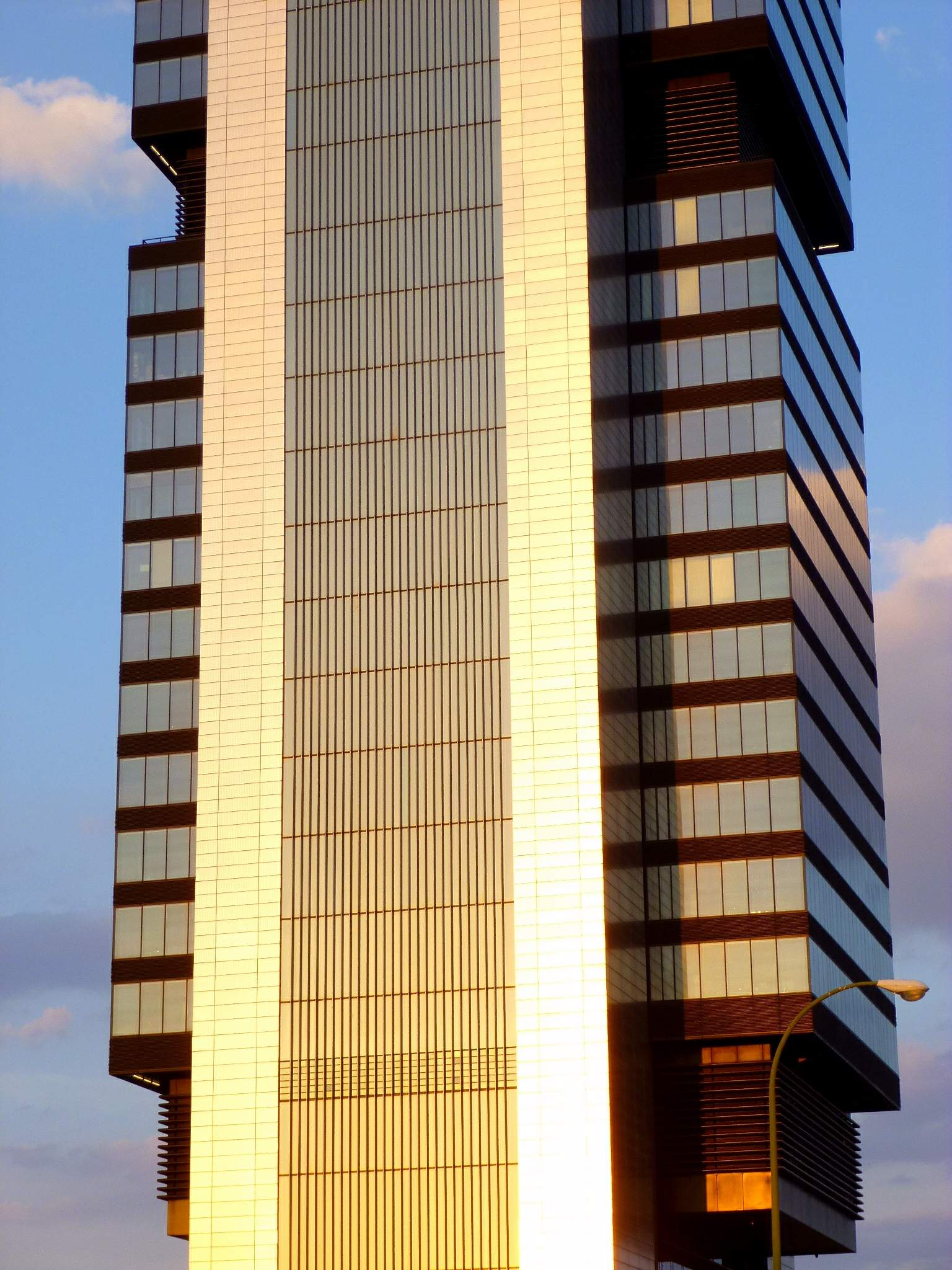
Side section of the tower

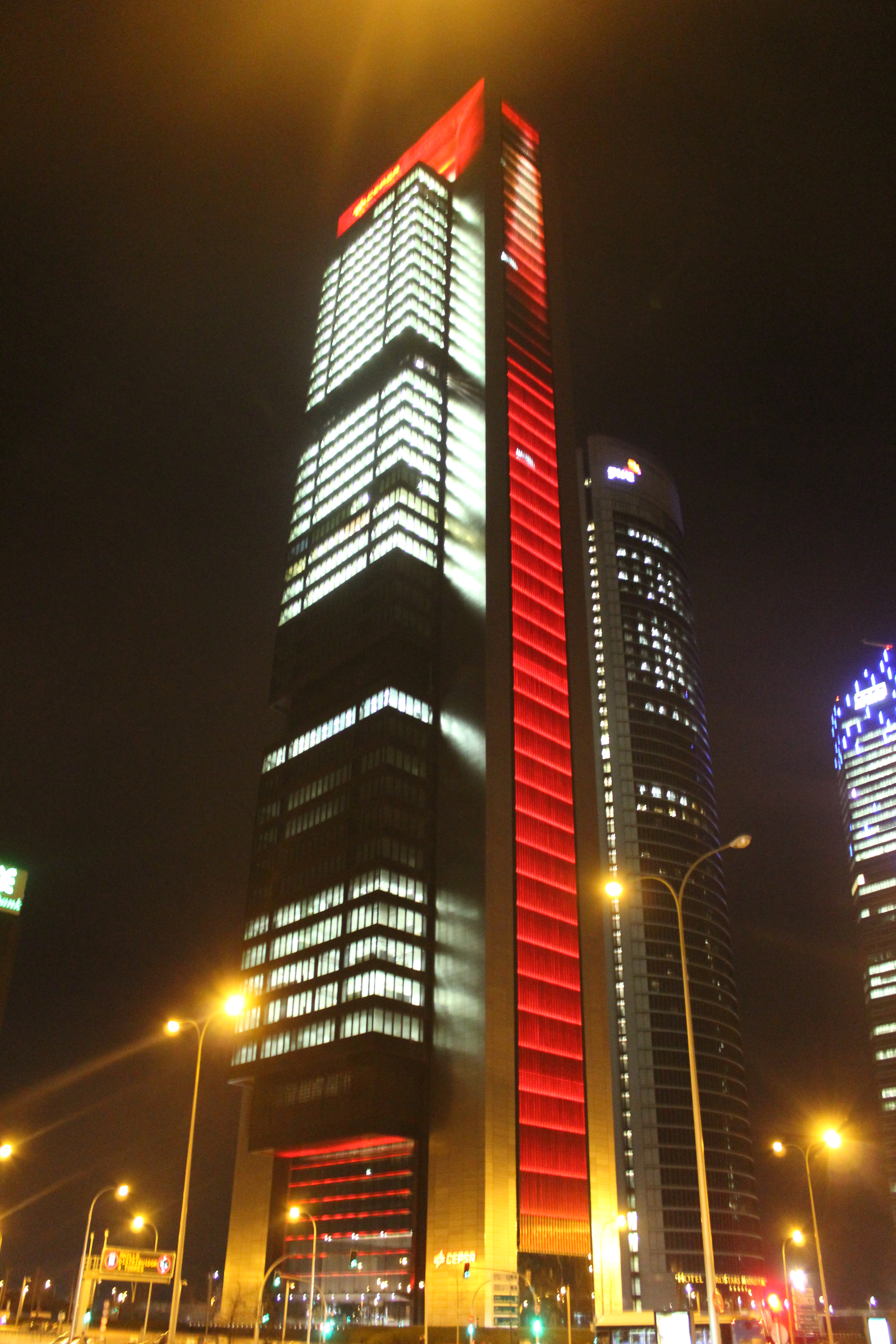
Night view of the tower

== See also ==
- List of tallest buildings in Spain
- List of tallest buildings in the world
- HSBC Building (Hong Kong), Fosters first skyscraper. It was also vertically segmented.
