= Edificio Kronos =

Residential skyscraper in Madrid

Coordinates: 38°32′47″N 0°07′17″W

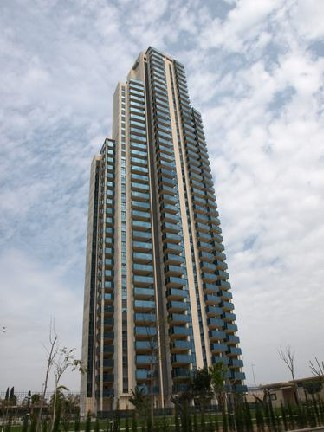
Edificio Kronos.

The Edificio Kronos (English: Kronos Building) is a residential building in Playa de Levante, Benidorm, Spain. It is 140 metres (476 feet) tall, has 41 floors, and overlooks the surrounding buildings and has views over Benidorm's bays and mountains.
