= Torre Lúgano =

Residential building in Benidorm, Spain

Coordinates: 38.5348°N 0.0993°W

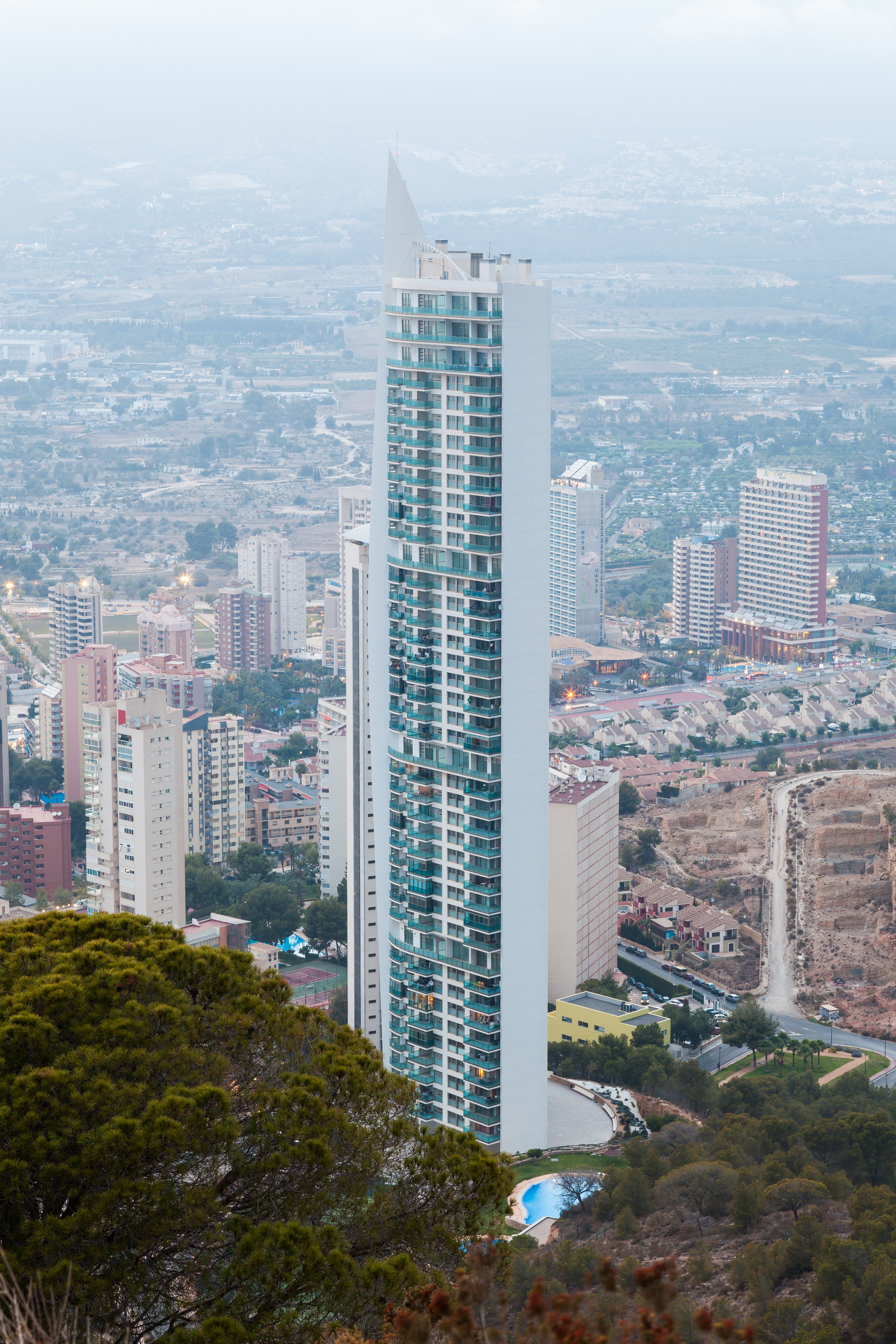

The Torre Lúgano is a residential building in Benidorm, Spain and measures 158 meters in height. It is the third tallest building in Benidorm, and the ninth tallest building in Spain.

== See also ==
- List of tallest buildings in Spain
