= Torre Picasso =

Skyscraper in Madrid, Spain

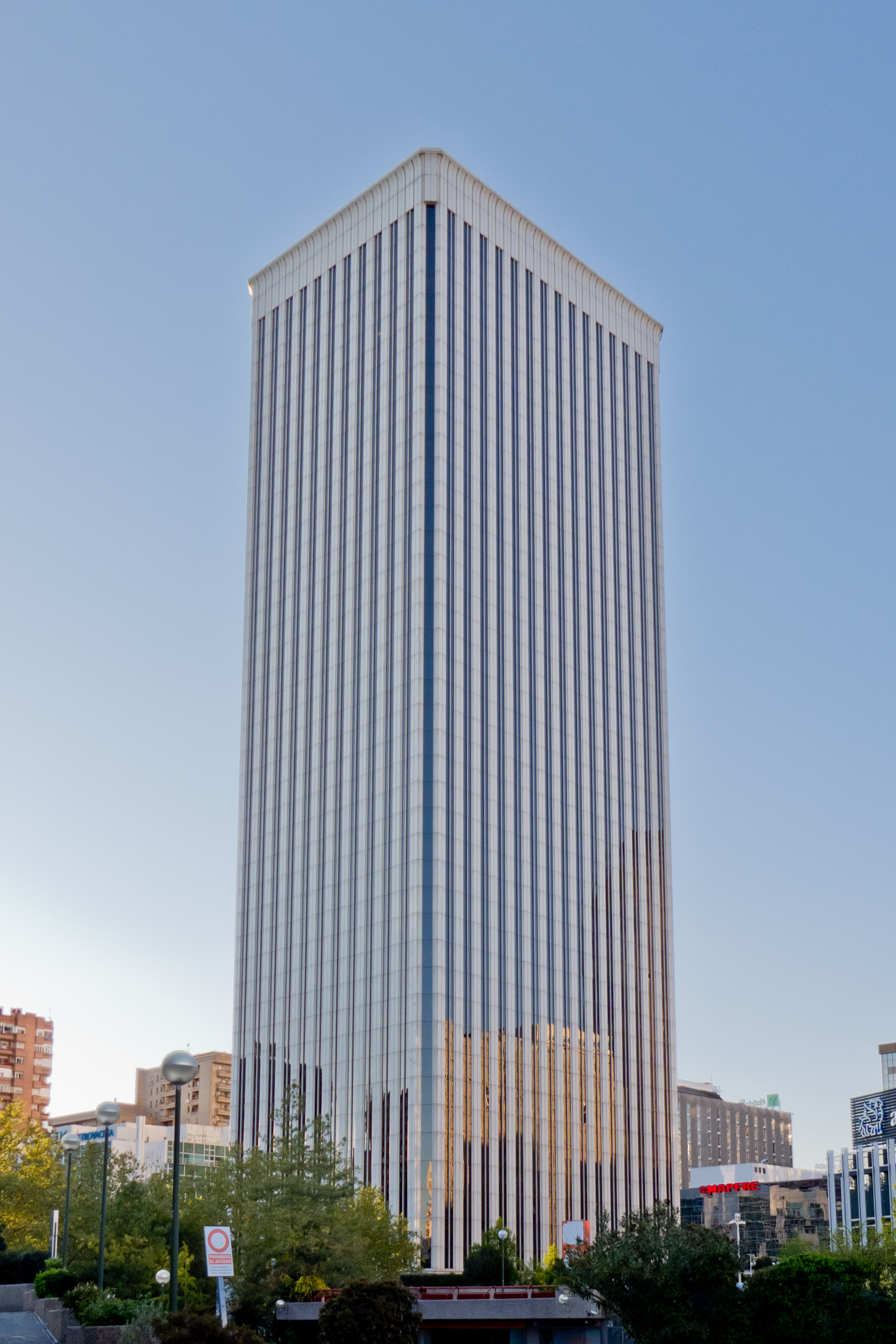

General information
- Location: Paseo de la Castellana, Madrid, Spain
- Coordinates: 40°27′01″N 3°41′33″W
- Construction started: 1982; 44 years ago
- Completed: 1988; 38 years ago
- Owner: Pontegadea Inmobiliaria
- Operator: PER Gestora Inmobiliaria

Height
- Roof: 157 m (515 ft)

Technical details
- Floor count: 46 above, 5 below
- Floor area: 121,000 m^{2} (1,302,000 sq ft)
- Lifts/elevators: 26

Design and construction
- Architects: Minoru Yamasaki; in collaboration with Jorge Mir Valls and Rafael Coll Pujol
- Main contractor: Construcciones y Contratas

Website
- www.esmadrid.com/en/tourist-information/torre-picasso

Torre Picasso (Picasso Tower) is a skyscraper in Madrid, Spain designed by Minoru Yamasaki. From 1988 until 2007 it was the tallest building in Madrid, measuring 515 ft (157 m) and with 43 floors. Torre Picasso is located next to the Pablo Picasso Square, within the commercial complex AZCA along the Paseo de la Castellana.

The building is currently the fifth-largest in Madrid and the tenth-tallest building in Spain.

== History ==
=== Planning and construction ===
The Torre Picasso was part of a plan to build a large block of modern buildings in the expansion area of northern Madrid. Construction of this area, better known as AZCA, began in 1970 and in 1975 the developer Unión de Explosivos Río Tinto, S.A. awarded the design of the tower to American architect Minoru Yamasaki, in collaboration with Jorge Mir Valls and Rafael Coll Pujol. In 1980, Yamasaki received a license to build the highest office complex of Madrid.

Construction began late 1982, and the building opened in December 1988. During this period, construction stalled for a period until new owners Portland Valderrivas S.A. and Inmobiliaria Asón S.A., purchased the incomplete structure and relaunched work in 1985 under the direction of architect Fernando Alas. In 2002, Fomento de Construcciones y Contratas (FCC) regained control of the building through a purchase of Portland Valderrivas. FCC owned the tower until December 2011 when Pontegadea Inmobiliaria, a division of Industria de Diseño Textil, S.A. purchased the structure for €400 million. PER Gestora Inmobiliaria, S.L.manages the building.

=== Skyline position ===
At its opening in 1988, Torre Picasso surpassed the elder office tower Torre de Madrid. Notable surrounding skyscrapers are Torre Europa, Banco de Bilbao Tower and Torre Titania. Torre Picasso was Spain's tallest building until 2001, when it was overtaken by the Gran Hotel Bali in Benidorm, Alicante, the Torre Espacio in 2007, and Torre Caja Madrid, Torre de Cristal and Torre Sacyr Vallehermoso since 2009.

== Figures and statistics ==
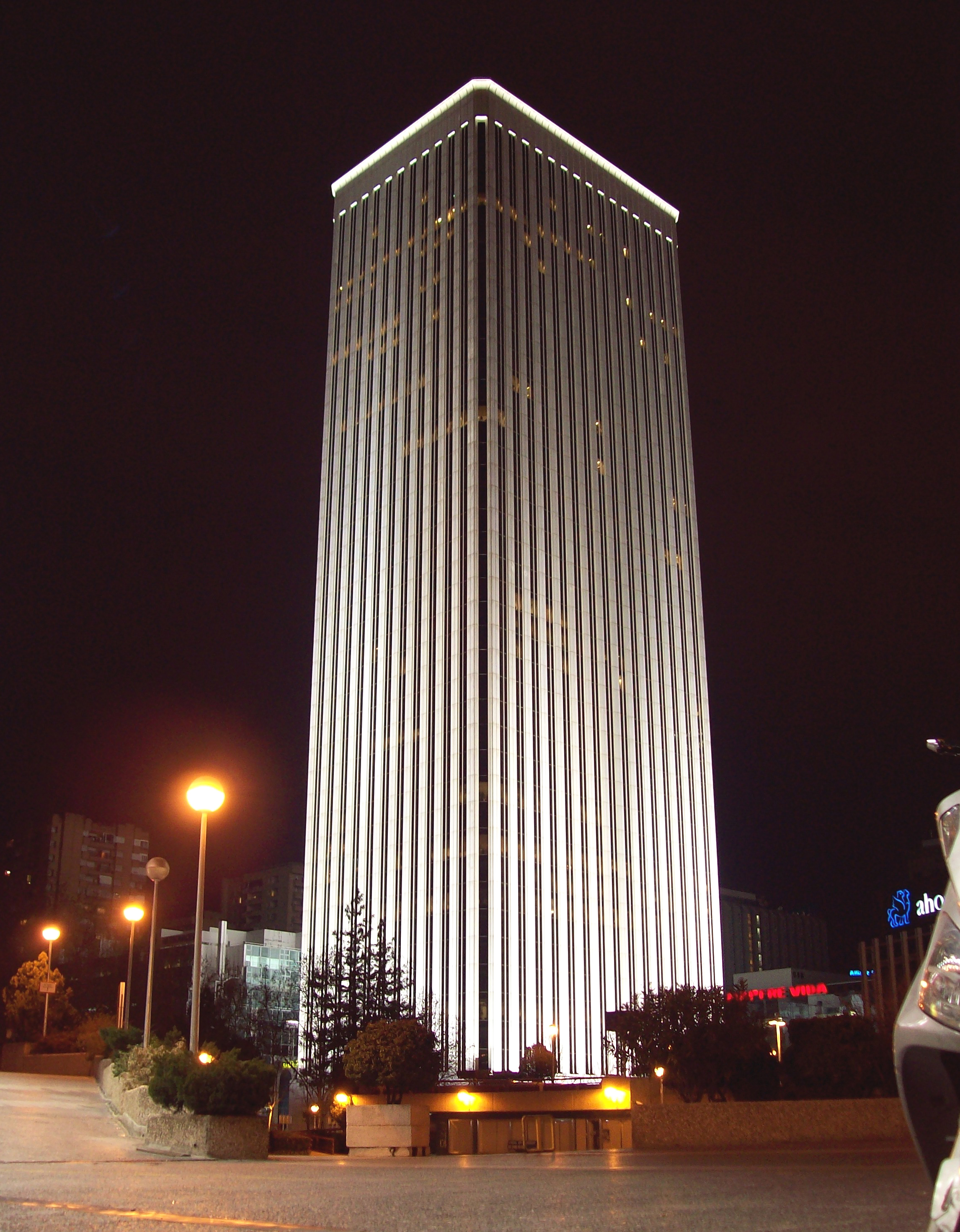
Night view. The building as seen from the junction of the Paseo de la Castellana and the Plaza de Pablo Ruiz Picasso.

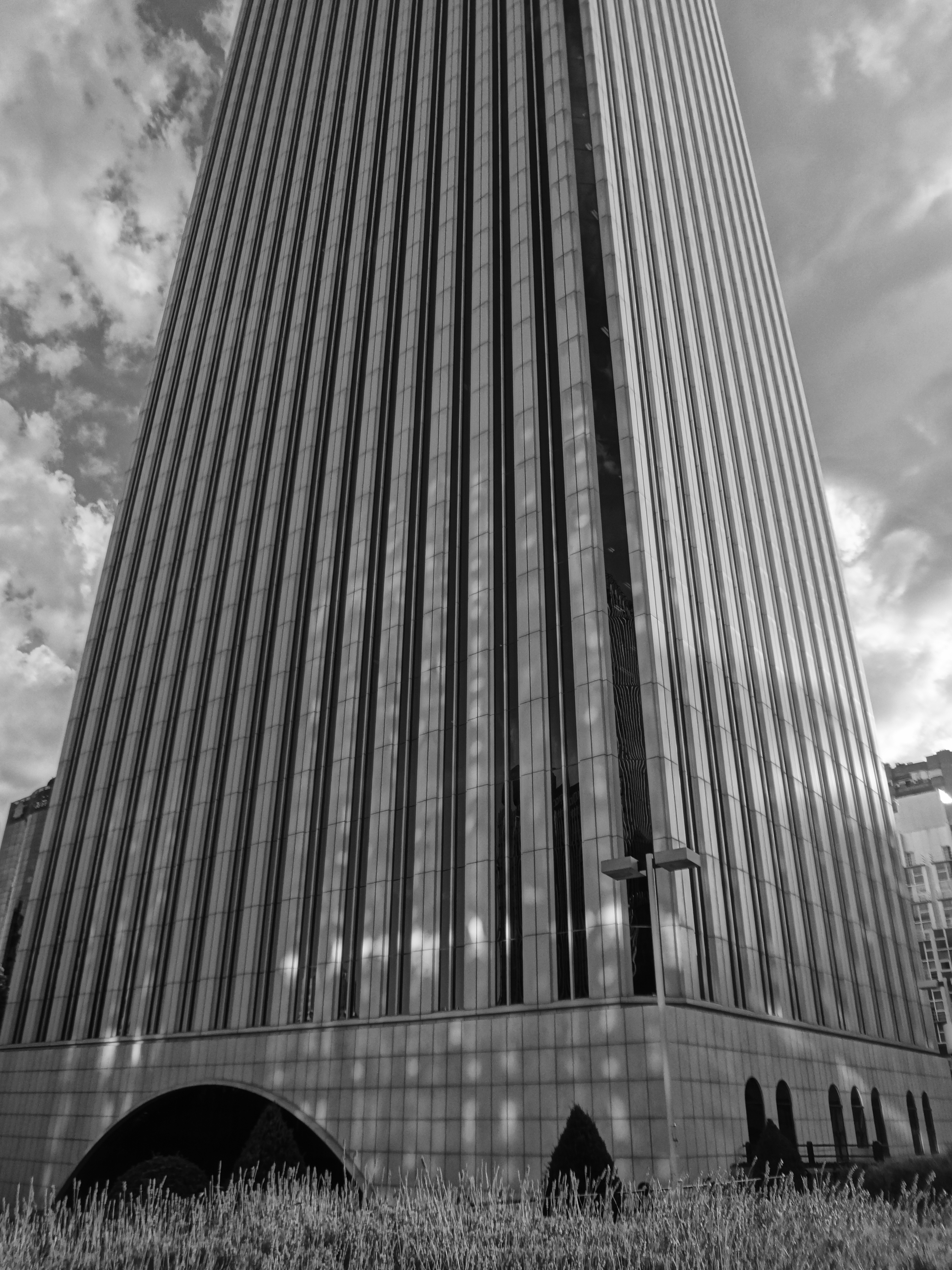
Black and white view looking southwest

The following information can be found on the official website of Torre Picasso:

- Height: 157 m (515.09 ft) above ground (171 m (561.02 ft) including basement)
- 43 floors
  - 5 basement floors (first level is a commercial area, others are parking)
  - ground floor houses the lobby
  - 42 floors house offices
  - 44th floor contains mechanical equipment
  - 45th floor contains the heliport
- Area: 71,700 m^{2} (771,772 sq ft) office space, 121,000 m^{2} (1,302,433 sq ft) in total
- Size per floor: 38 m × 50 m (124.67 ft × 164.04 ft)
- 26 elevators; 18 serve office floors divided into three zones:
  - 1st-18th floors at 2.5 m/s (8.20 ft/s)
  - 18th-32nd floors at 4 m/s (13.12 ft/s)
  - 32nd-43rd floors at 6 m/s (19.69 ft/s) (fastest in Spain)
- Glass façade surface: 9,000 m^{2} (96,875 sq ft)
- Parking space: 837
- Foreseen population: 6,000 persons
- Daily visitors: 1,500 persons

== Architecture ==
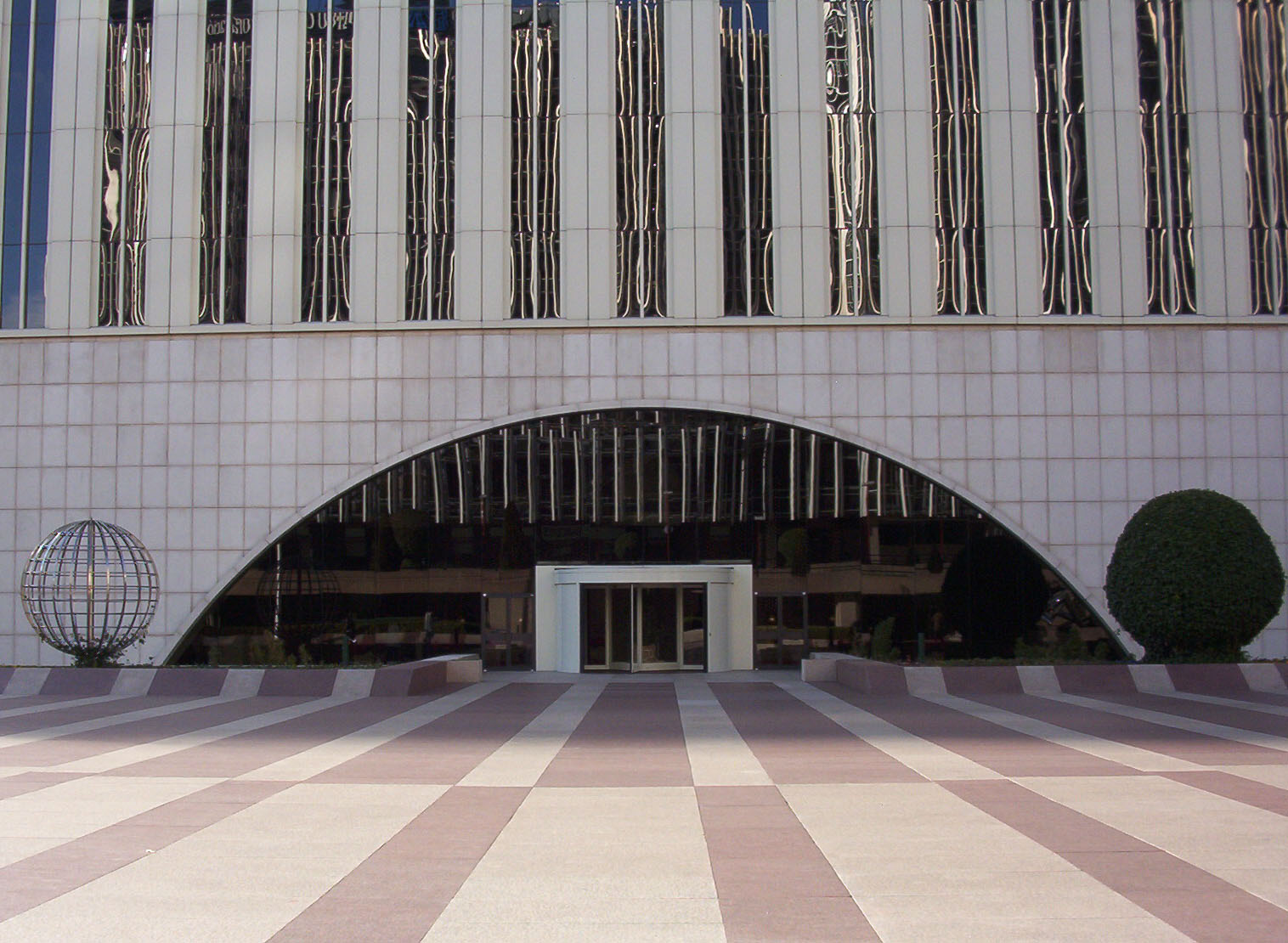
The entrance arch

The structure has a rectangular footprint with a windowless two-storey base. A wide round arch, resting on an underground steel structure for support, serves as the entrance and supports the façade above. The opening under this arch is covered by a special security glass named STADIP (the one used in Torre Agbar in Barcelona). Windows on floors 3 through 43 are grouped in twos divided by a slender pier. The groupings are divided by larger piers into 15 bays across the front of the building and 11 bays on the sides. The façade is covered in white aluminum and the corners of the structure are chamfered. The top two floors are also windowless and the parapet flares to form a cornice. Elevators, in three groupings, occupy a bay in the rear of the structure along with stairways.

== Cultural depictions ==
- The tower was previously home to the Canal+ TV studios.
- It was featured in the last scenes of Alejandro Amenábar's 1997 movie Open Your Eyes. Lead character César (portrayed by Eduardo Noriega) commits suicide by jumping from the Torre Picasso.
- It was featured in the Crisis (TV series) pilot as the Porter Pearce HQ though the action is supposed to happen in the DC area.
