= AZCA =

Office building in Madrid

AZCA Mixed Association for Compensation of the A Block of the Commercial Area of Paseo de la Castellana
- AZCA; Asociación Mixta de Compensación de la Manzana A de la Zona Comercial del Paseo de la Castellana
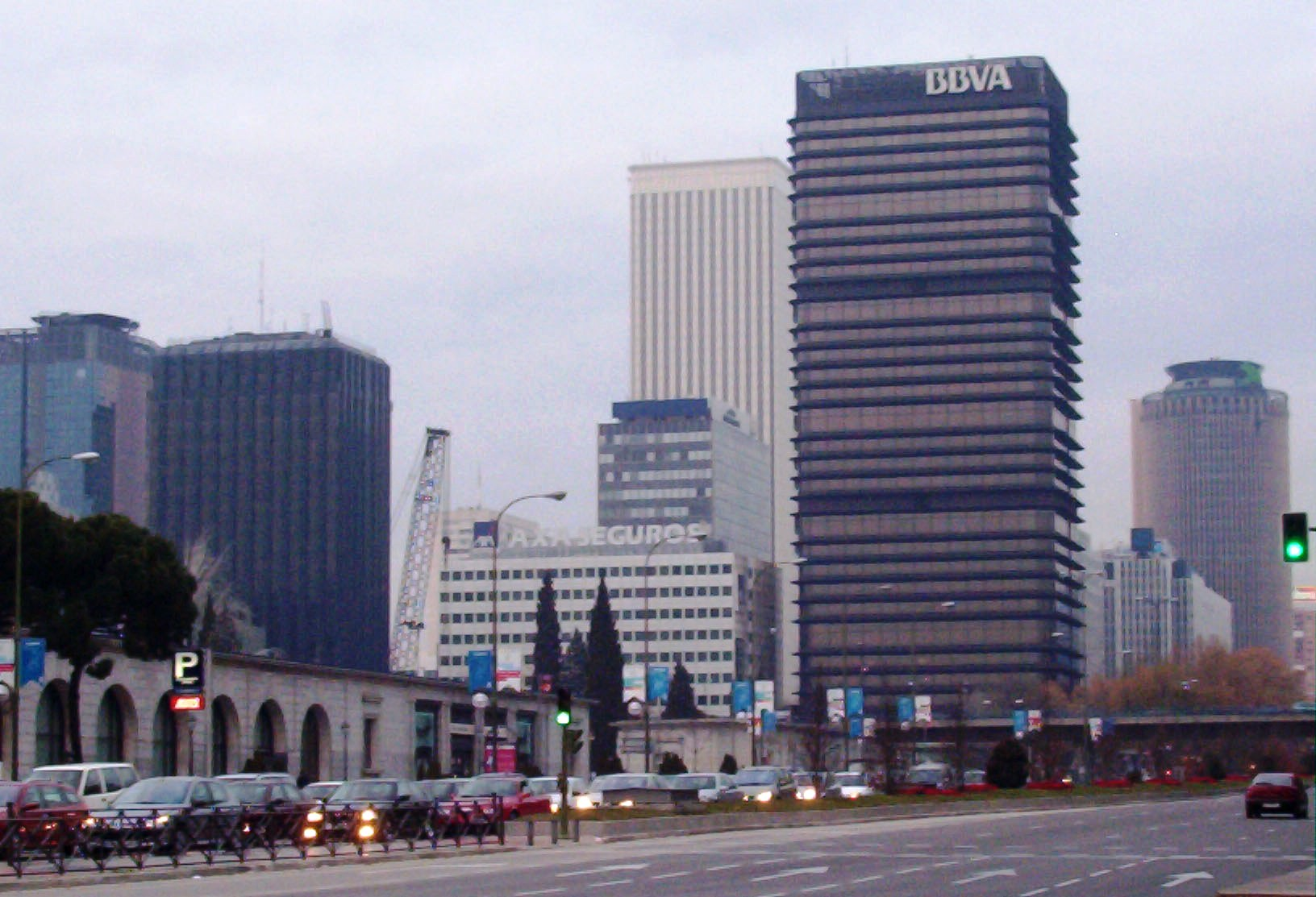
- AZCA from Paseo de la Castellana.
- Interactive map of the AZCA; Mixed Association for Compensation of the A Block of the Commercial Area of Paseo de la Castellana area

General information
- Status: Completed
- Type: Office
- Location: Madrid, Comunidad de Madrid, Spain
- Coordinates: 40°26′57″N 3°41′34″W
- Construction started: Torre Windsor: 1975 (†); Torre del Banco de Bilbao: 1978; Torre Picasso: 1982; Torre Europa: 1985; Torre Mahou: 1987; Torre Titania: 2007
- Completed: Torre Windsor: 1979 (†); Torre del Banco de Bilbao: 1981; Torre Picasso: 1988; Torre Europa: 1985; Torre Mahou: 1990; Torre Titania: 2013

Height
- Roof: Torre Picasso: 157 m (515 ft); Torre Europa:121 m (397 ft); Torre del Banco Bilbao: 107 m (351 ft); Torre Windsor:106 m (348 ft) (†); Torre Titania: 104 m (341 ft); Torre Mahou:85 m (279 ft)

Technical details
- Floor count: Torre Picasso: 47; Torre Windsor: 32 (†); Torre del Banco Bilbao: 30; Torre Europa: 30; Torre Mahou: 29; Torre Titania: 22

Design and construction
- Architects: Torre Windsor (†): Rafael Alemany Indarte, Luis Alemany Indarte, Pedro Casariego, Ignacio Ferrero, Genaro Alas Rodríguez y Manuel del Río Martínez; Torre del Banco de Bilbao: F.J. Sáenz de Oiza; Torre Picasso: Minoru Yamasaki; Torre Europa: Miguel de Oriol e Ybarra; Torre Mahou: Carlos Alberto Arce, Carlos Malibrán y Raúl Eduardo Salata; Torre Titania: Pablo Muñoz y Pedro Vilata

AZCA, an acronym for Asociación Mixta de Compensación de la Manzana A de la Zona Comercial de la Avenida del Generalísimo ("Mixed Association for Compensation of the A Block of the Commercial Area of the Avenue of the Generalisimo", now called the Avenue of Paseo de la Castellana), is a financial district in Madrid, Spain. The business district, which is located on the northern edge of the city centre, serves as one of the two main financial districts of the Madrid metropolitan area.

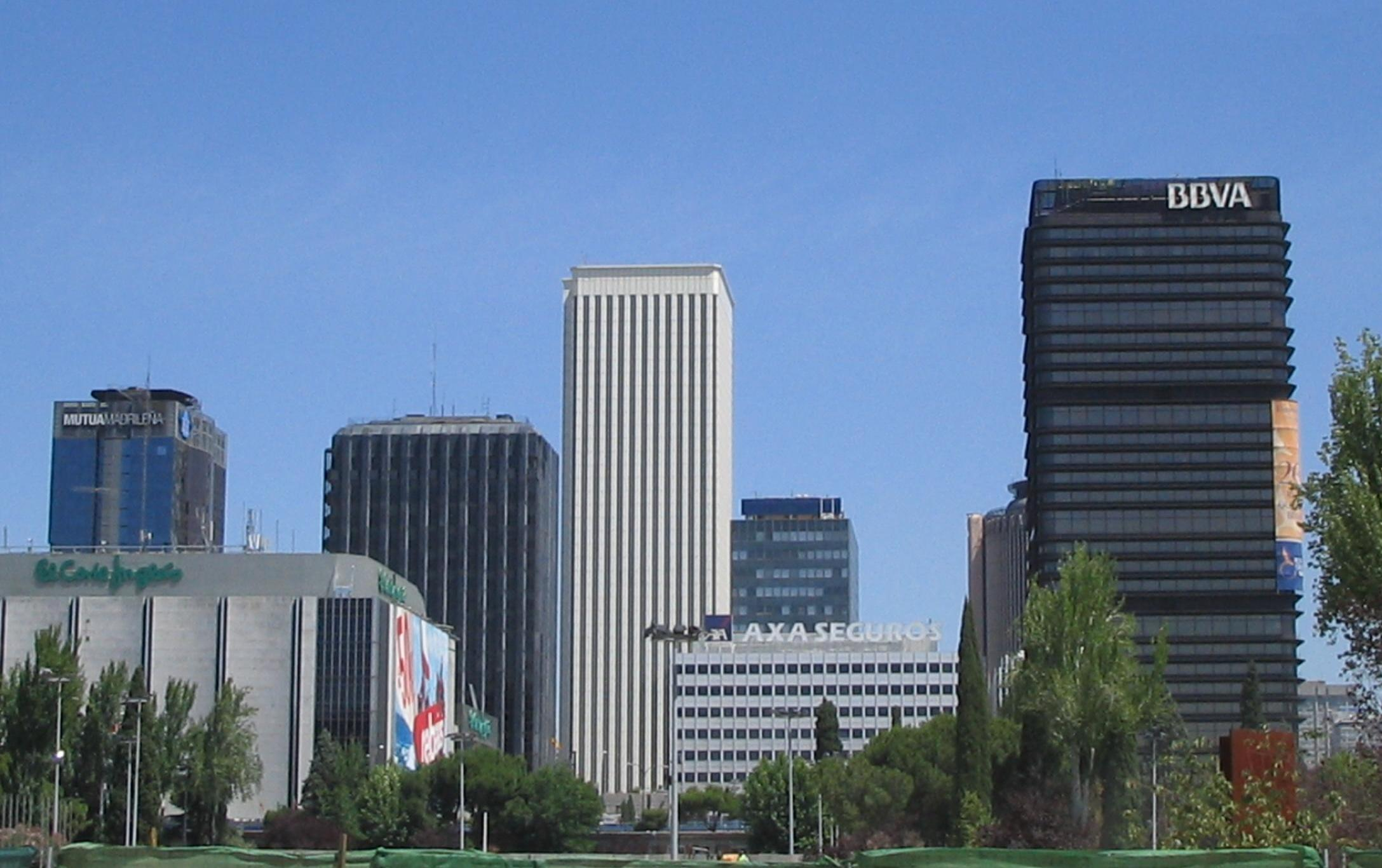
AZCA View from the Nuevos Ministerios station (to the right, the Torre del Banco Bilbao).

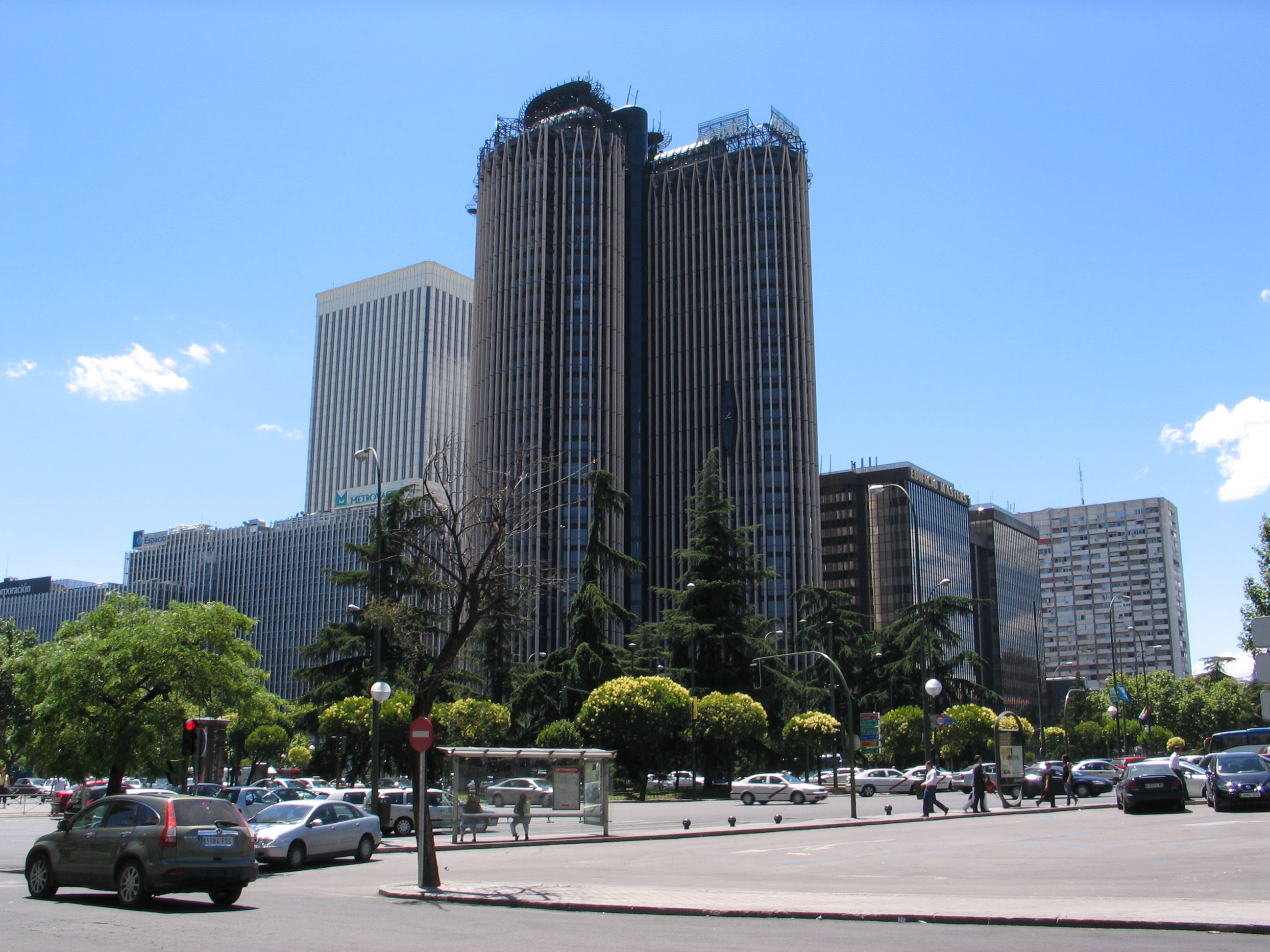
View of Torre Europa from the Square of Lima.

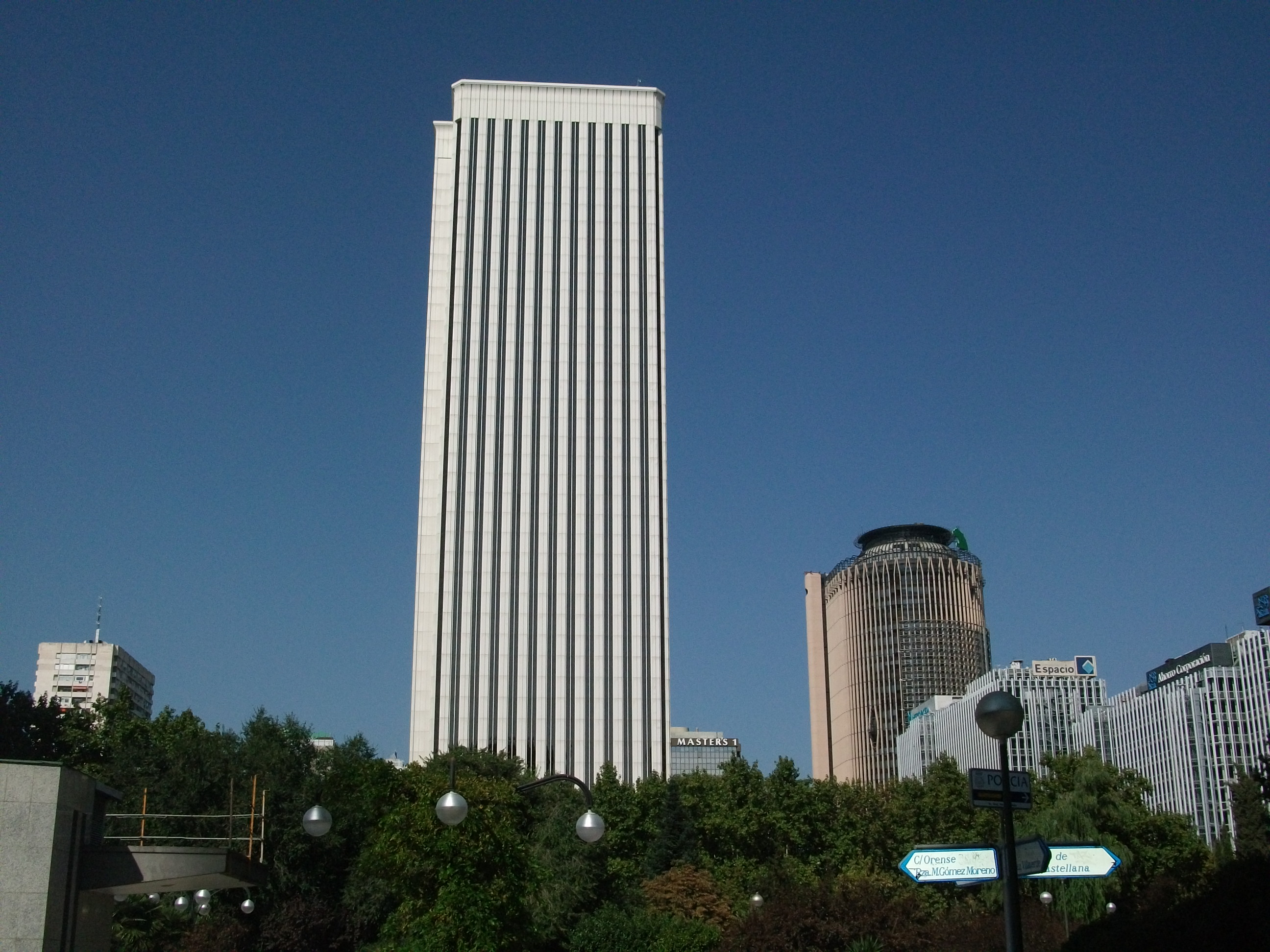
AZCA buildings (Torre Picasso).

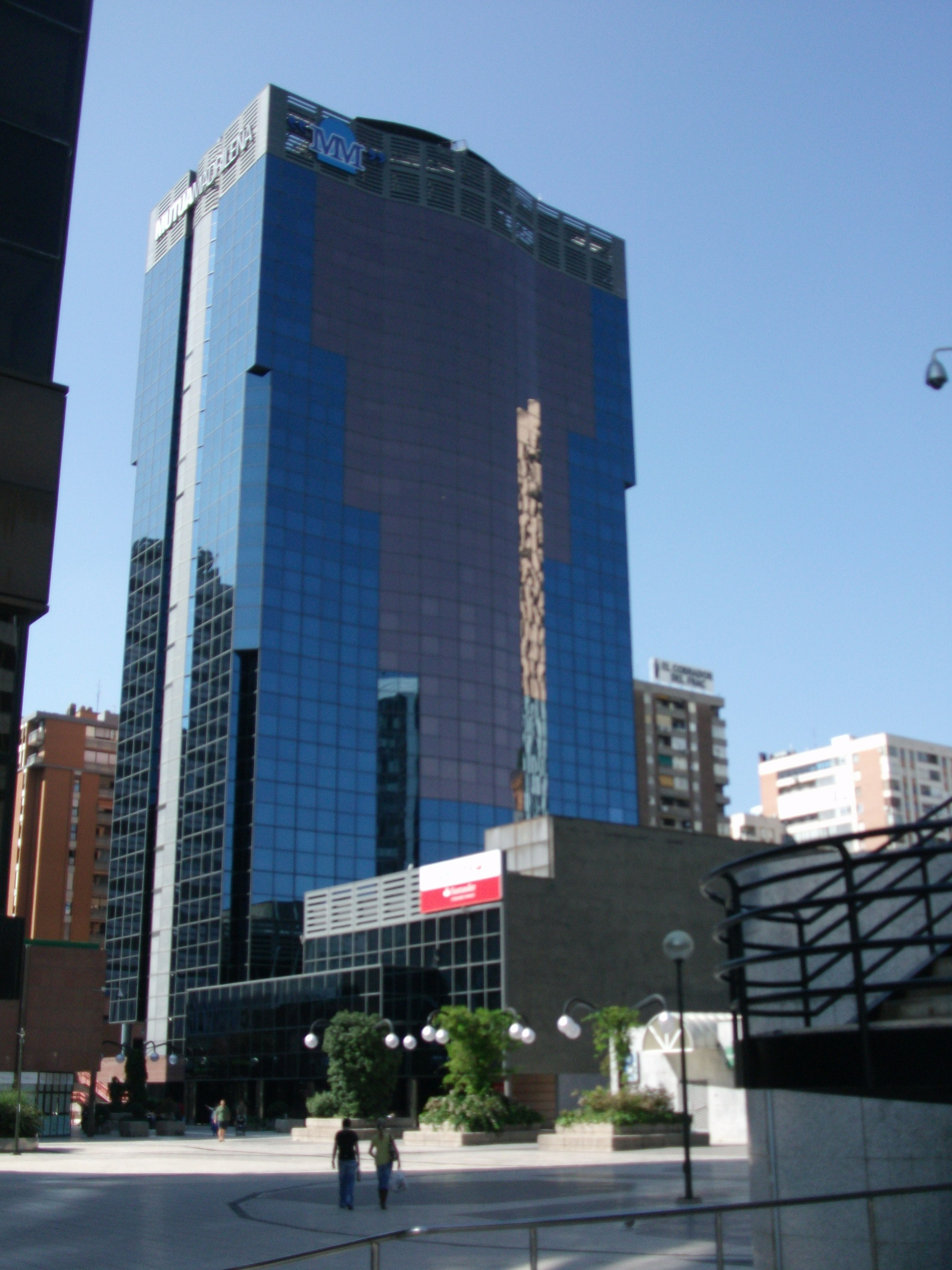
AZCA buildings (Torre Mahou).

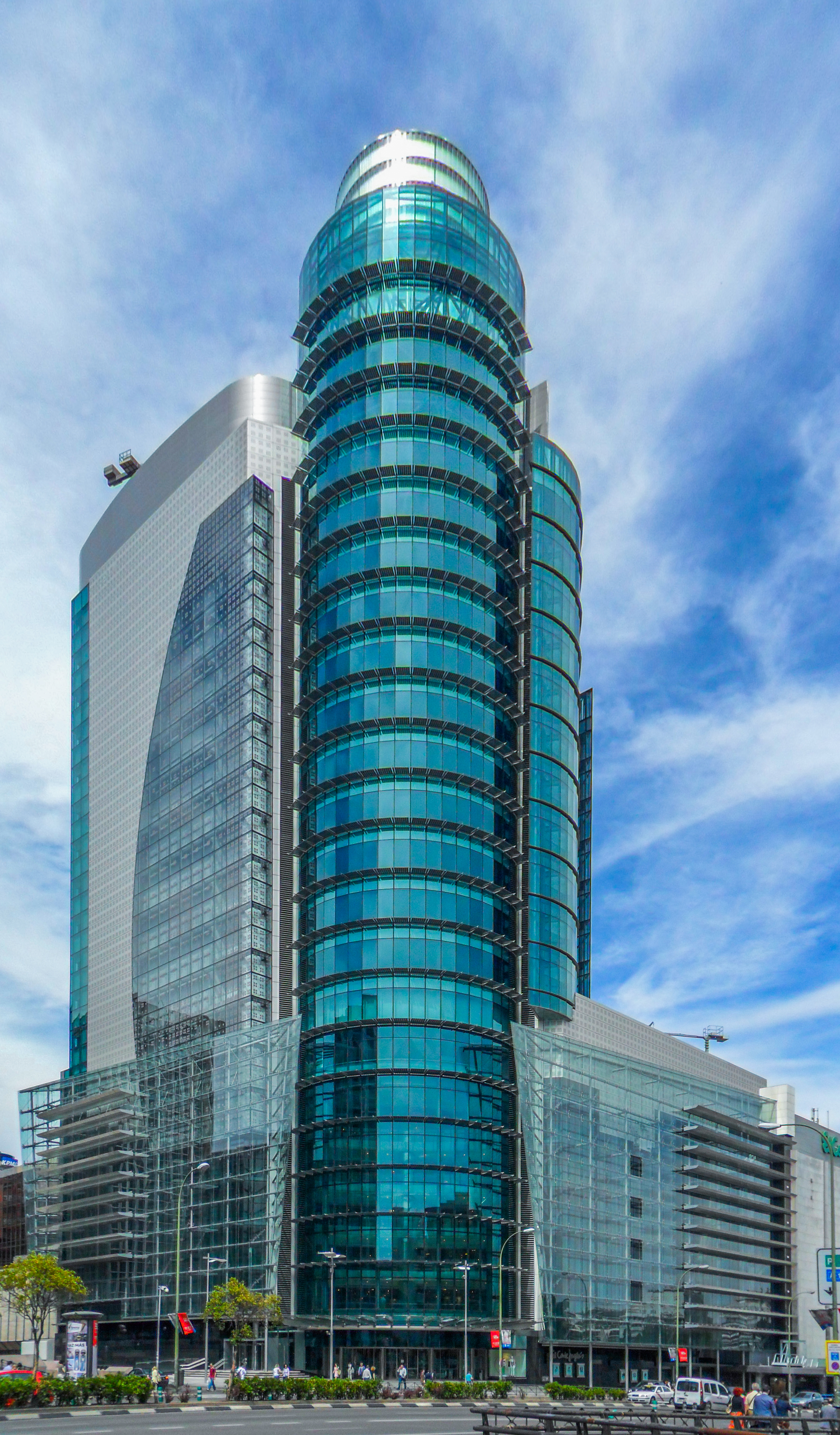
AZCA buildings (Torre Titania, The most modern building which replaced the Tower Windsor).

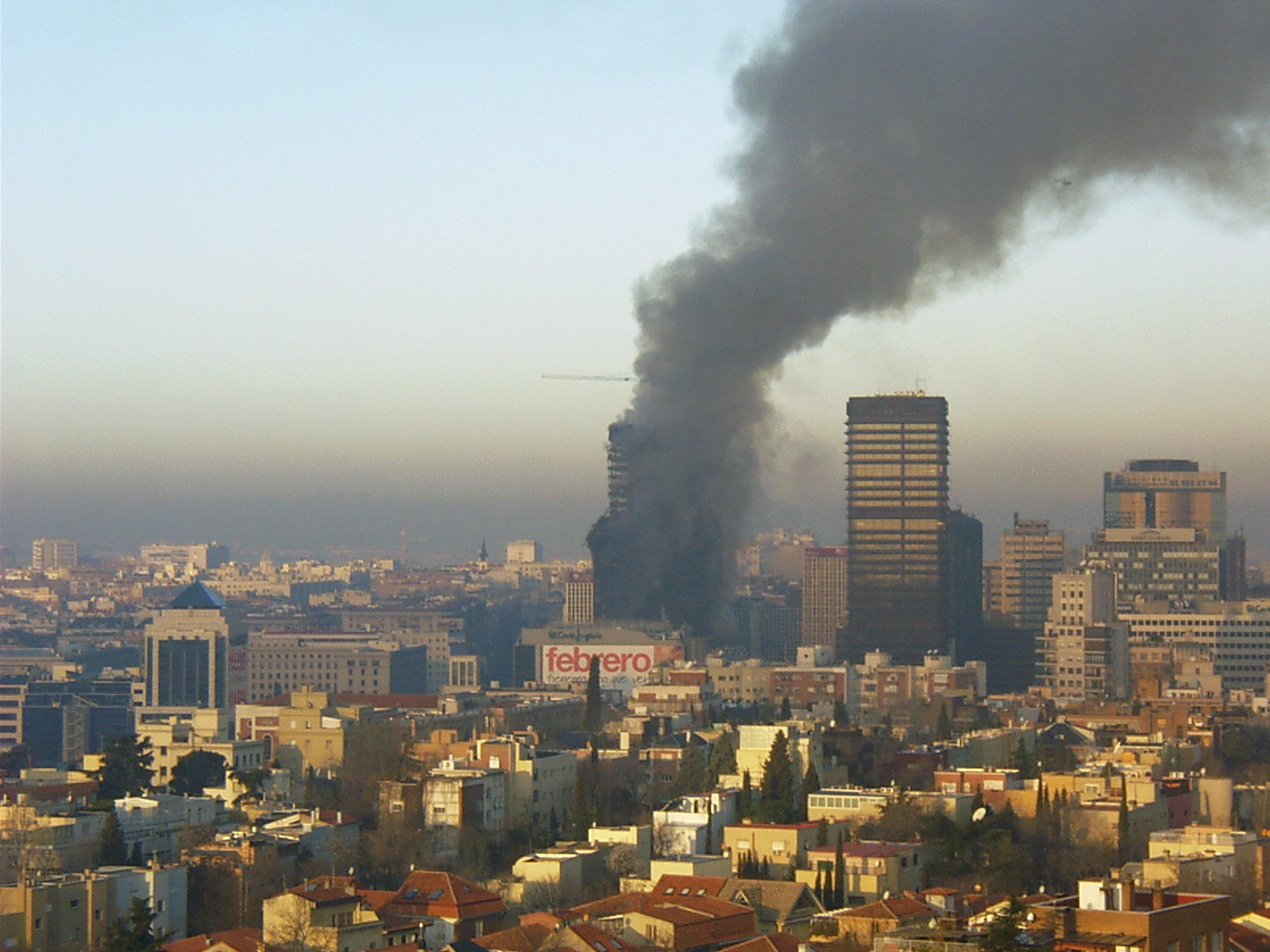
The Torre Windsor the morning of February 13, 2005. Its remains were demolished and in its place today edifies the Torre Titania.

== History ==
It is located between the streets Raimundo Fernández Villaverde, Orense, General Perón and Paseo de la Castellana. Its original conception (and its name) dates back to the Plan General de Ordenación Urbana de Madrid (PGOU), approved in 1964. The purpose of this plan was to create a huge block of modern office buildings with metro and railway connections in the expansion area of northern Madrid, just in front of Real Madrid stadium (currently named the Santiago Bernabéu Stadium) and beside the new government complex of Nuevos Ministerios. A botanical garden, a library and an opera house were also included in the plans, but these were never built.

The construction began in the 1970s after many delays. Nowadays some of the tallest and most beautiful modern Madrid skyscrapers are placed here. The most important are:

- Torre Picasso (157 m)
- Torre Europa (121 m)
- Banco de Bilbao Tower (107 m)
- Torre Titania (104 m)
- Torre Mahou (100 m)

In February 2005, Windsor Tower (106 m) was destroyed by a fire, and it was later replaced by Torre Titania.

During the weekend nights, the underground levels attract a Latino audience to the discos but they also have a reputation for gang violence.

In 2007, a new skyscraper area was built farther north along Paseo de la Castellana.

The carless surfaces inside the block have attracted young supporters of urban culture. Since the 1980s, break dancers, rappers, skateboarders, graffiti writers and parkour traceurs from other Madrid neighborhoods have been gathering there.

== See also ==
- Plaza de Pablo Ruiz Picasso
