= Torre Triana =

Tower in Sevilla, Spain

Tower Triana
- Torre Triana (Spanish)
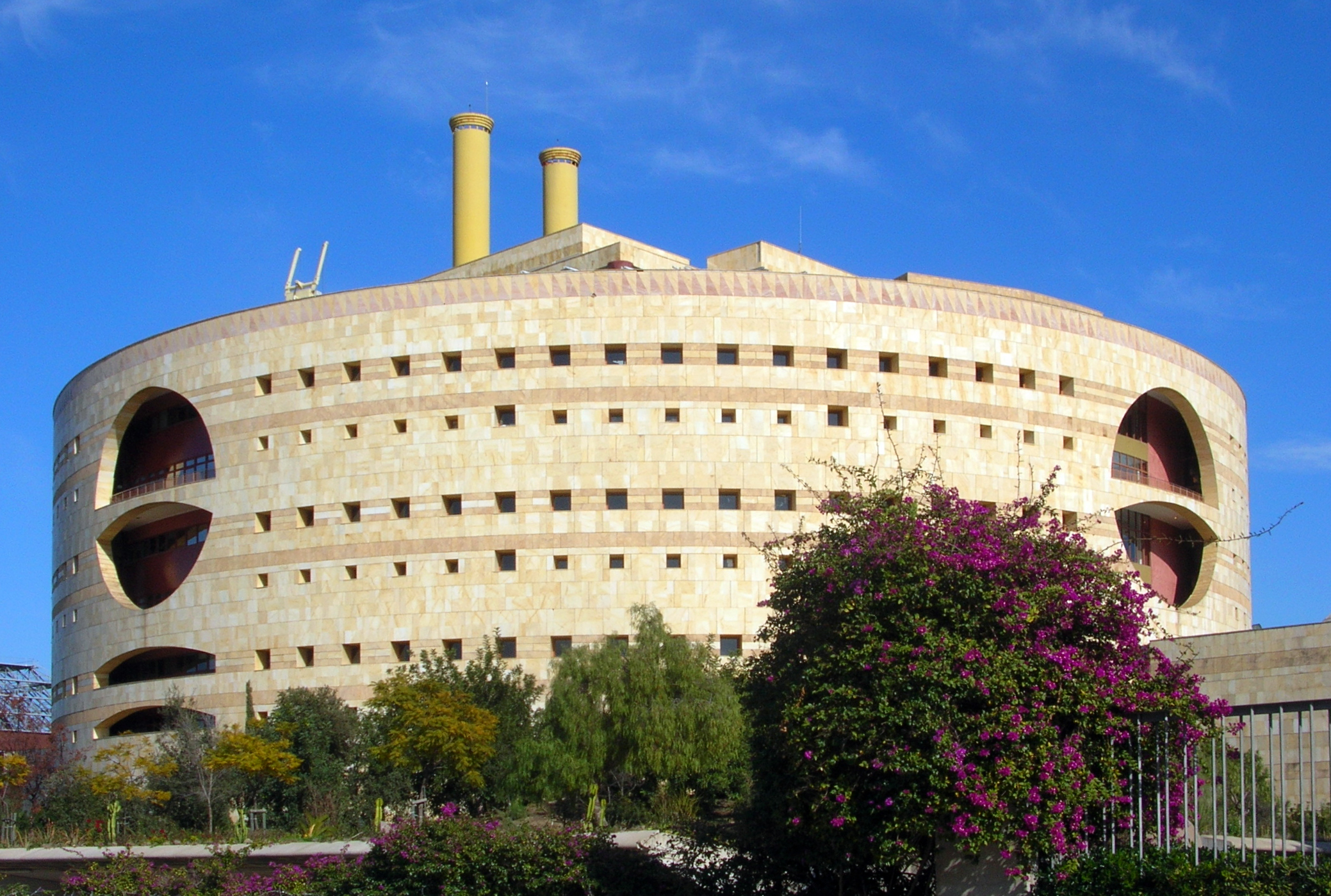
- Interactive map of the Tower Triana area

General information
- Type: Administrative building
- Architectural style: Postmodern
- Location: Carretera Cádiz-Huelva, Sevilla, Spain
- Coordinates: 37.39382°N 6.01165°W
- Completed: 1993

Height
- Architectural: 55 m (180 ft)

Technical details
- Floor count: 8

Design and construction
- Architect: Francisco Javier Sáenz de Oiza

Torre Triana is an administrative building belonging to the Junta de Andalucía in Sevilla, Spain. Built in 1993, it stands at 55 m (180 ft) tall with 8 floors and was designed by the Navarrese architect Francisco Javier Sáenz de Oiza.

== History ==
It is located on the Isla de la Cartuja in Seville, and is one of the largest administrative buildings of the Regional Government of Andalusia. It houses the central offices of the current Ministries of Economy, Finance and European Funds, and of Educational Development and Vocational Training, corresponding to the 12th Legislature, employing approximately two thousand civil servants.

Although it was standing during the 1992 Seville Universal Exposition, which was held nearby, it was not finished and put into use until 1993. Architect de Oiza was inspired by the Castel Sant'Angelo in Rome.

With a postmodern style and ochre yellow color, its circular shape makes it very unique. The facade of the building is cladded in Amarillo Triana, a local sortiment of marble, which was named after the complex while it was being built.

== See also ==
- Sevilla
- Junta de Andalucía
