= Torres Blancas =

Building in Madrid, Spain

Coordinates: 40.43987°N 3.67187°W

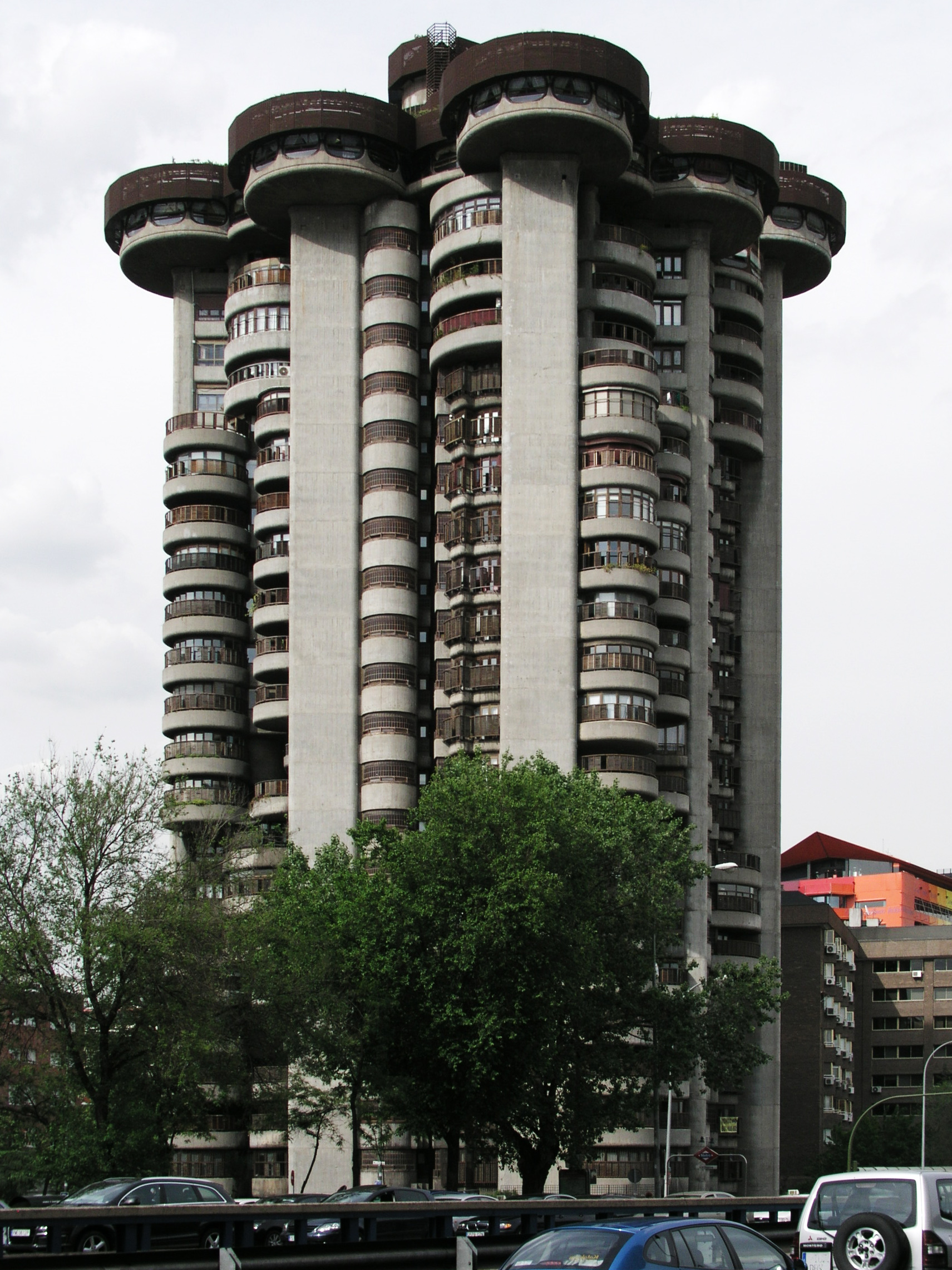
- Interactive map of the Torres Blancas area

General information
- Architectural style: Organic architecture Brutalism
- Location: Avenida de América, 37, 28002 Madrid, Spain
- Construction started: 1964
- Completed: 1969

Height
- Height: 71 m

Design and construction
- Architect: Francisco Javier Sáenz de Oiza

Torres Blancas is a mixed use concrete building in Madrid, Spain, designed in 1961 by Spanish architect Francisco Javier Sáenz de Oiza. The structure is a noted example of Spanish Organicism. Spanish industrialist Juan Huarte commissioned the project which initially included two residential towers. The video for the single Rainy Days by V (singer) of BTS was filmed here on the top floor.

== See also ==
- List of Brutalist structures
