= Torre Mahou =

Skyscraper in Madrid

Coordinates: 40°26′55″N 3°41′39″W

Edificio Alfredo Mahou
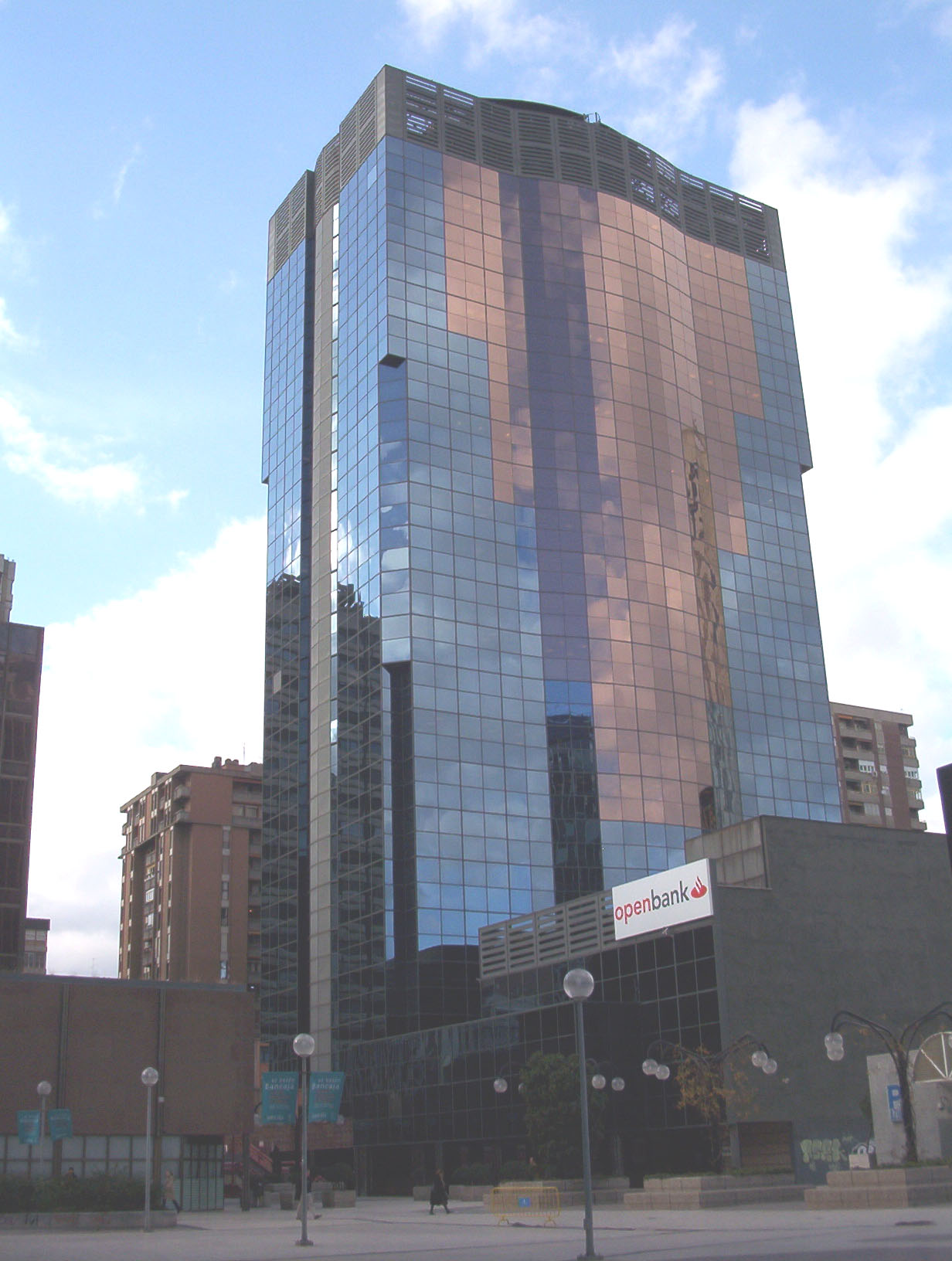

General information
- Status: Completed
- Type: Office
- Location: AZCA, Madrid, Spain
- Construction started: 1987; 39 years ago
- Completed: 1990; 36 years ago

Height
- Roof: 85 m (279 ft)

Technical details
- Floor count: 29

Design and construction
- Architects: Carlos Alberto Arce; Carlos Malibrán; Raúl Eduardo Salata

Edificio Alfredo Mahou (Alfredo Mahou Building), also known as Torre Mahou (Mahou Tower) is a skyscraper in the AZCA Complex, Madrid, Spain. It coexists with the Torre del Banco de Bilbao, the Torre Europa and the Picasso Tower. It is the 17th tallest building in Madrid, at 85 metres / 279 ft. It has 29 floors and its facade is crystal blue and purple.

Was completed in 1990, the building houses offices and various companies.
