= Francisco Javier Sáenz de Oiza =

Spanish architect (1918–2000)

- Born: 12 October 1918; Cáseda, Navarre, Spain
- Died: 18 July 2000; Madrid, Spain
- Occupation: Architect
- Awards: Medalla de Oro de la Arquitectura (1989); Prince of Asturias Award for the Arts (1993)
- Projects: Torres Blancas; Sanctuary of Arantzazu

Francisco Javier Sáenz de Oiza (12 October 1918 – 18 July 2000) was a Spanish architect and influential practitioner of the modernist movement in Spain.

== Biography ==
Born in Cáseda, Navarre, Francisco Javier Sáenz de Oiza went to school in Seville and studied architecture in Madrid. After a study trip to the United States, in 1949, he returned to Madrid where he started teaching at the School of Architecture, later becoming its director.

Among the numerous awards he received in Spain were the National Architecture Award (1946 and 1954), Gold Medal for Architecture (1989), and the Prince of Asturias Award (1993).

Sáenz was considered to be one of the most influential Spanish architects during the second half of the 20th century.

He died of cancer in Madrid in 2000.

== Projects ==
One of his most notable projects was the Torres Blancas high-rise apartment and office building in Madrid. With a height of 71 metres, it was built between 1964 and 1969. The façade consists of cylindrical volumes crowned by round overhanging balconies. Other notable projects include the Arantzazu Basilica in Oñati, the Torre Triana administrative building in Seville, the Spanish Embassy in Brussels, the Public University of Navarra in Pamplona, the remodelling of an old palace in Las Palmas, Gran Canaria, into the Atlantic Center of Modern Art, and the Banco de Bilbao Tower in Madrid.

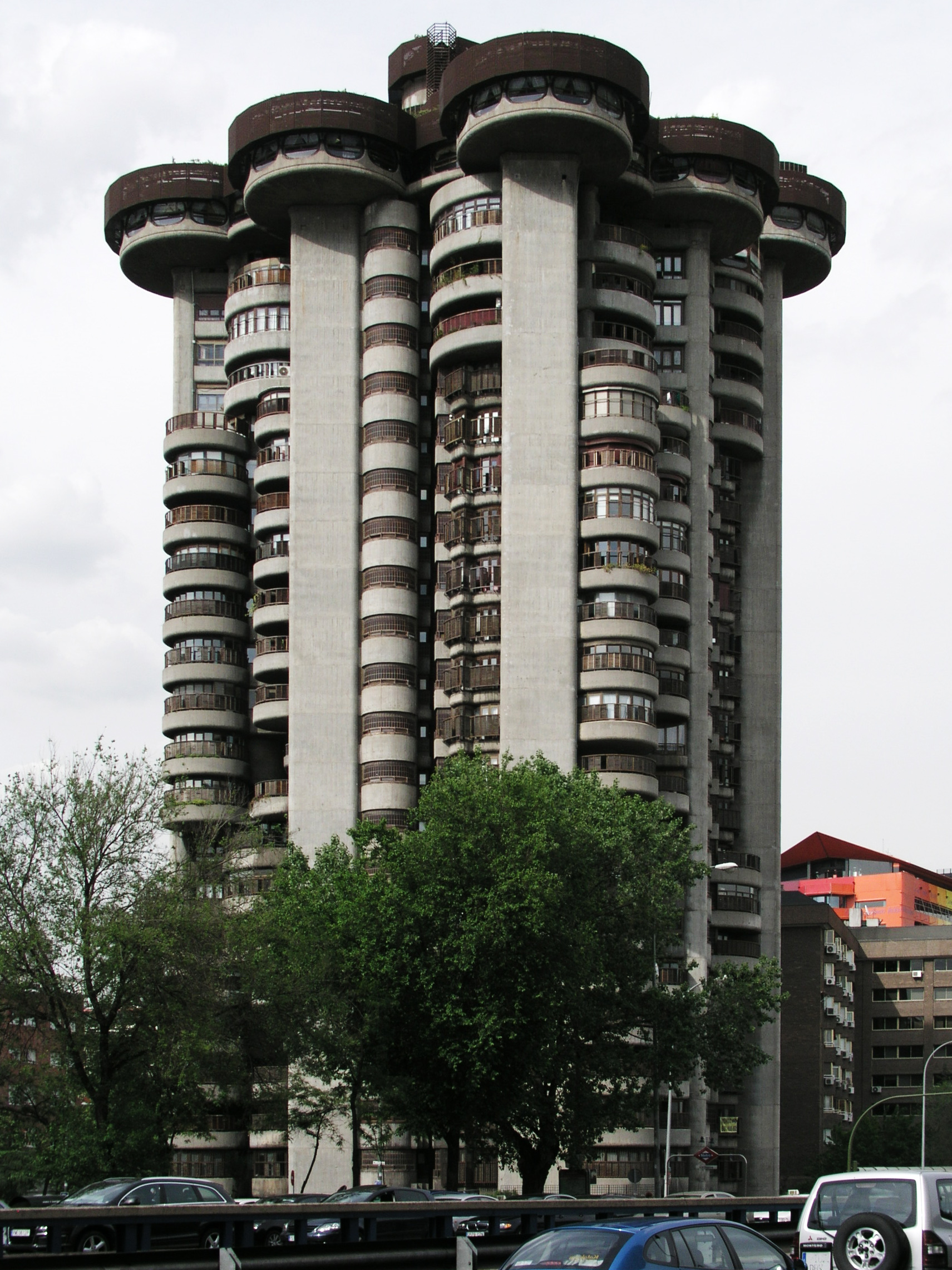
Torres Blancas, Madrid

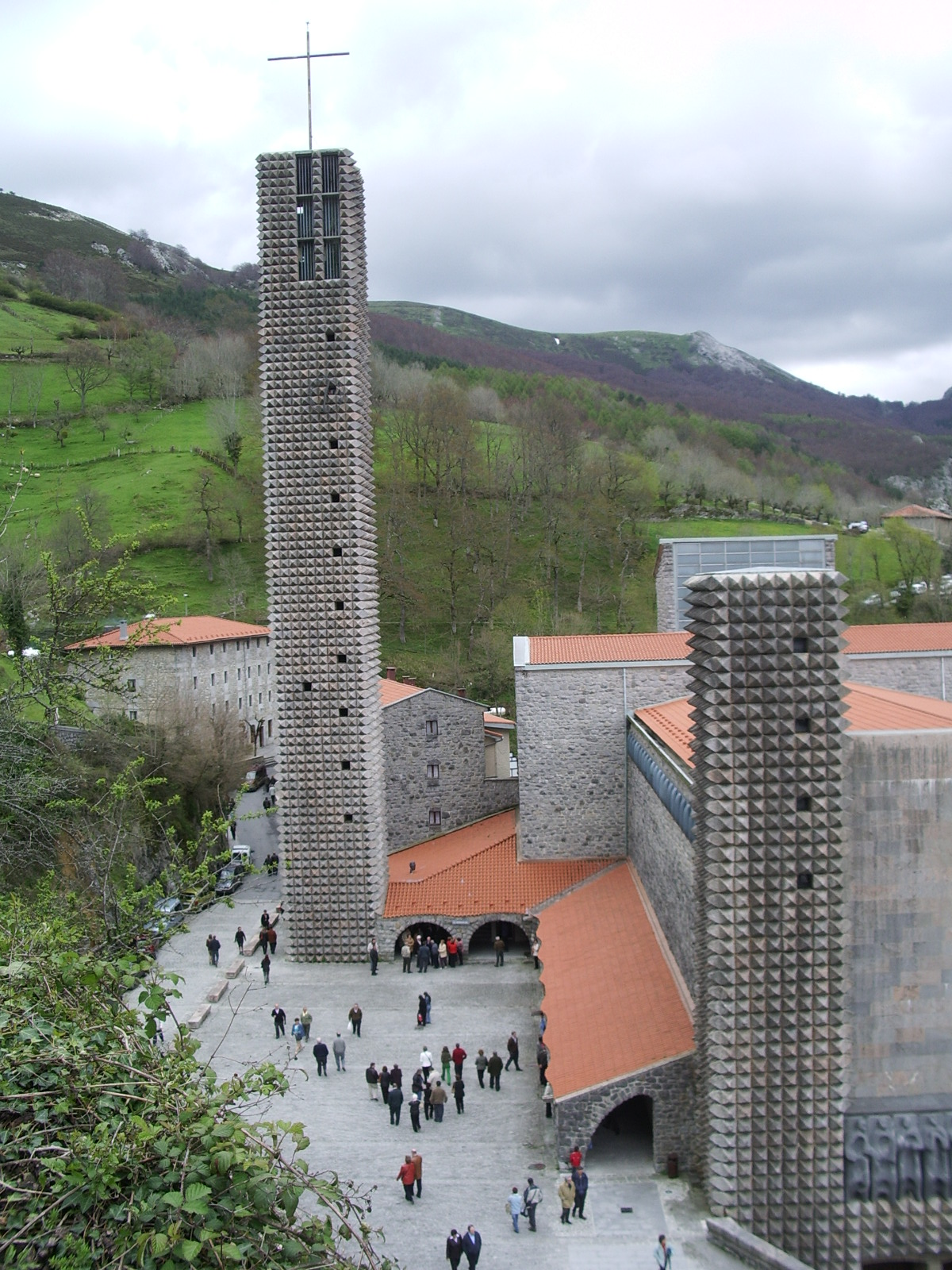
Sanctuary of Arantzazu

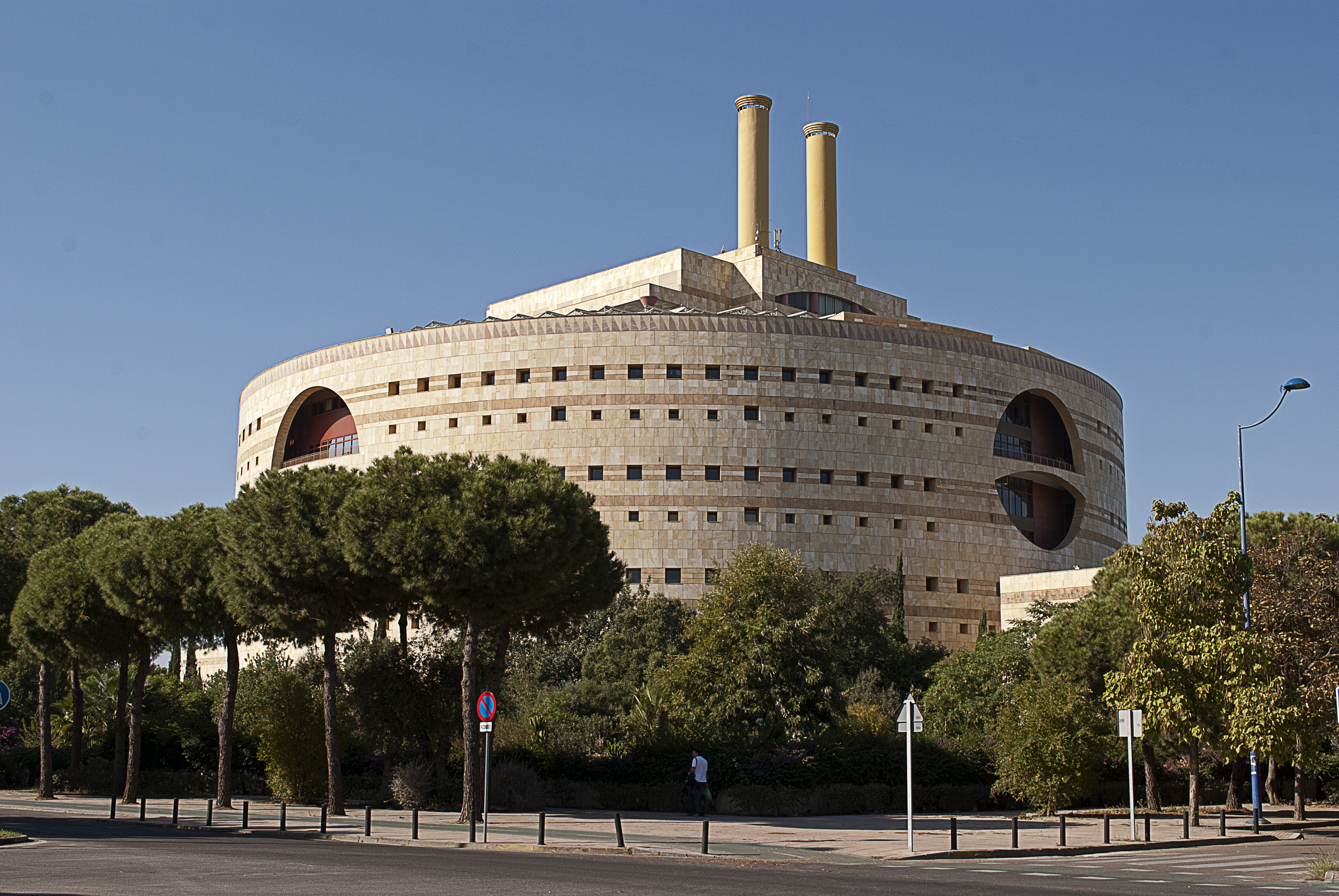
Torre Triana, Seville

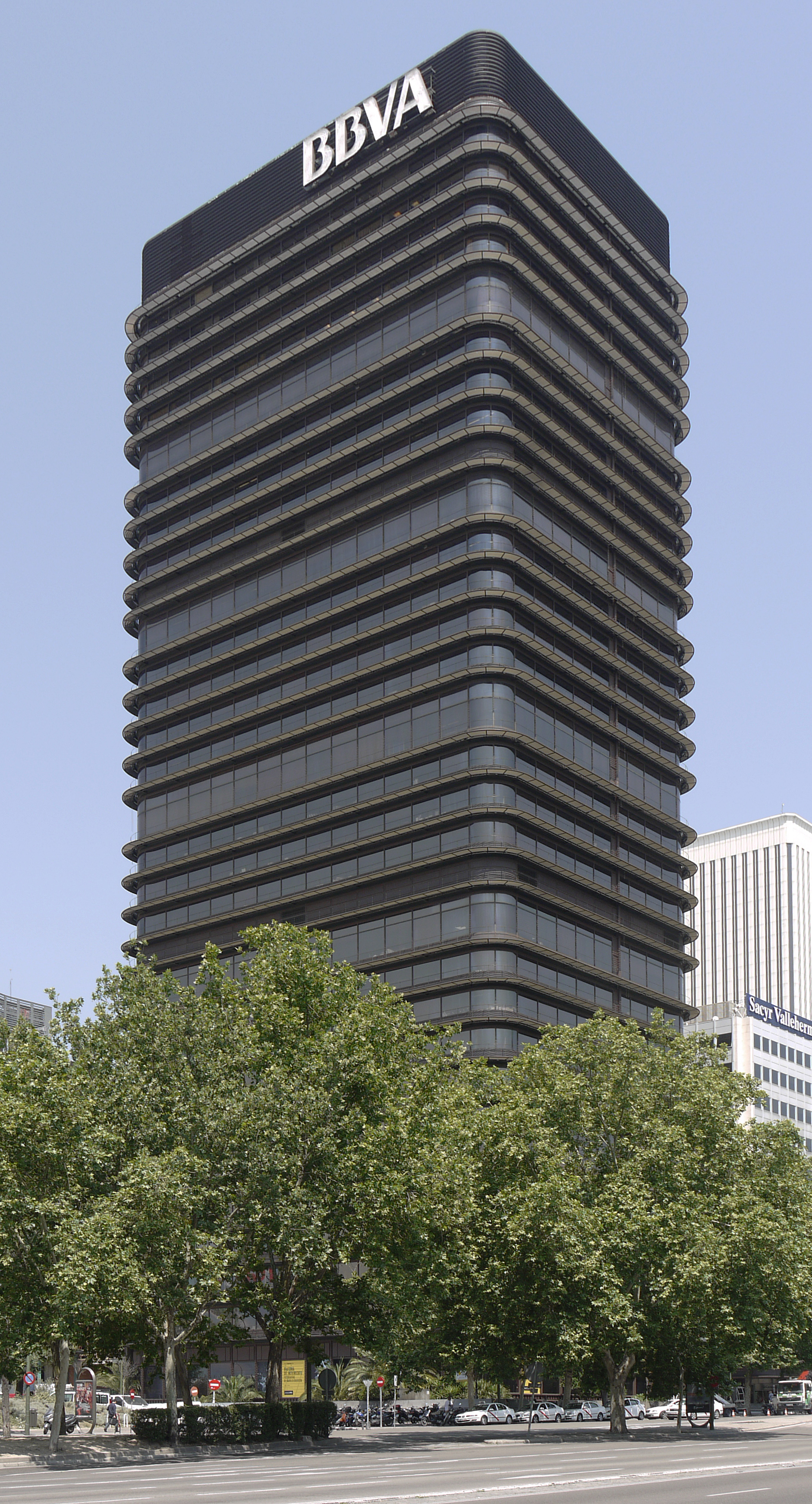
Banco de Bilbao Tower, Madrid

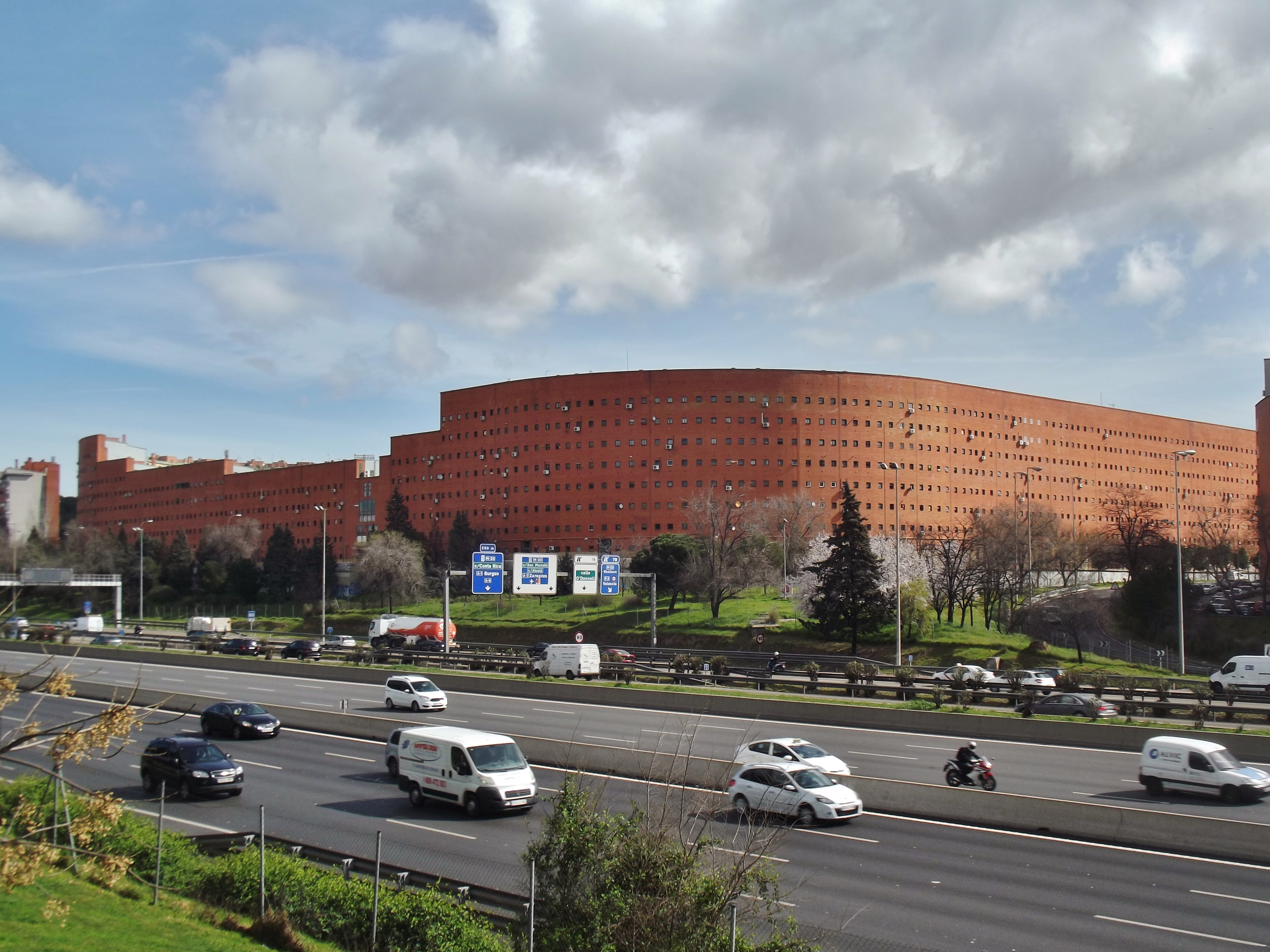
El Ruedo housing estate, Madrid
