= Torre Europa (Madrid) =

Skyscraper in Madrid

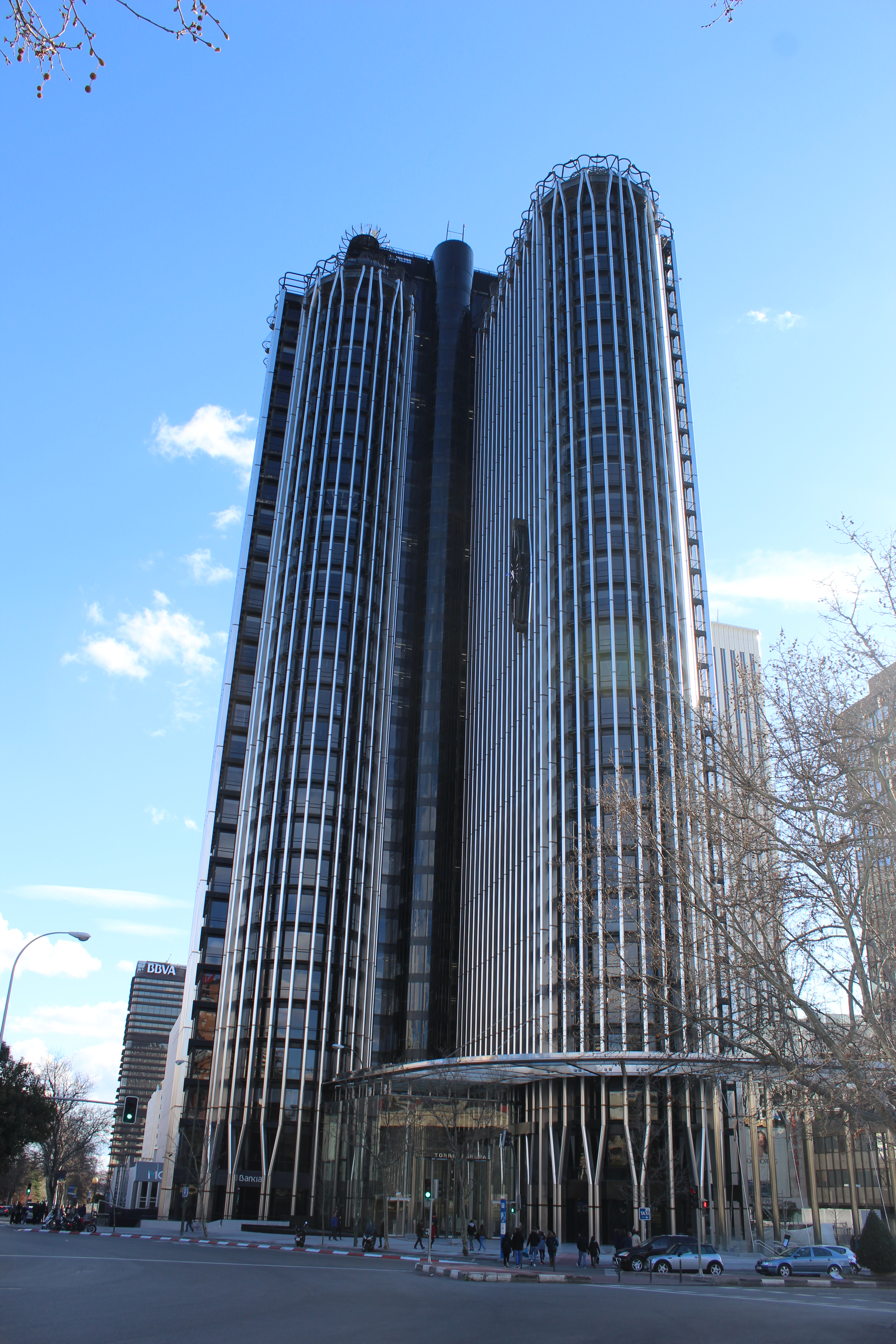
- The tower in March 2018

General information
- Status: Completed
- Type: Office
- Location: Pº de la Castellana 95 Madrid, Spain
- Coordinates: 40°27′6″N 3°41′30″W
- Construction started: 1975; 51 years ago
- Completed: 1985; 41 years ago
- Renovated: 2016–2018; 8 years ago
- Cost: ₧5.3 billion
- Owner: Infinorsa
- Operator: Bovis Lend Lease

Height
- Roof: 116.1 m (381 ft)

Technical details
- Floor count: 30
- Floor area: 37,100 m^{2} (399,000 sq ft)
- Lifts/elevators: Otis Worldwide

Design and construction
- Architect: Miguel Oriol e Ybarra
- Developer: Infinorsa
- Structural engineer: LKS Group & CHC Ingenieros
- Main contractor: Necso

Torre Europa formerly known as Torre de Empsa is a high-rise office building in the AZCA business district of Madrid, Spain. Built between 1975 and 1985 by Necso, the tower stands at 121 metres (397 ft) tall with 30 floors and is the 8th tallest building in Madrid.

== History ==
Completed in 1985, it was designed by Spanish architect Miguel Oriol e Ybarra and built by the Spanish energy company Necso. The terrorist organization ETA threatened to destroy the building on 1 May 2002 with 20 kilograms (44 lb) of high explosive. In 2020, Torre Europa underwent a change of ownership when AGIB Real Estate acquired the tower from Infinorsa. Following the transition, the building has since faced neglect and entered a state of decay.

Construction of the Torre Europa, originally named Torre de Empsa, began in 1974 and was completed in 1985. It is the most important work of Miguel de Oriol e Ybarra. The façade is very similar to the buildings of the former World Trade Center, but the building's floor plan is different. It has a large oval clock in the middle of the building, with a light that is very visible at night. The building was intended to become the headquarters of Banco Hispano Americano, but in 1985 the bank sold the tower to an investment group of Spanish and foreign capital, headed by the Swiss reinsurance firm Swiss Re.

On October 5, 1990, a fire broke out on its 29th floor, fortunately without serious consequences. The terrorist group ETA attacked the building on May 1, 2002, with 20 kg of powerful explosive, but only managed to destroy some windows.

=== Reform ===
Following the departure of its main tenant, KPMG, to the Torre de Cristal, the building's owner decided to completely renovate it with an investment of 40 million euros. The works were carried out between 2016 and 2018. The building is now more energy efficient, as evidenced by its LEED Platinum certification. The façade received a new metallic cladding, a fact that architect Miguel de Oriol has denounced to the Official College of Architects of Madrid.

=== Usage ===
Following the renovation, the tenants are the law firm Freshfields, the International Air Transport Association (IATA), the pharmaceutical company Shire, and the German fund manager Aquila Capital (formerly located in the Columbus Towers). Axpo Holding, Atlantic Copper, Swiss Re, and AOL also occupy the facilities.

== In pop culture ==
The tower has made several appearances in movies. The first cameo appearance of the building was both externally and internally in the Spanish comedy series Séptimo cielo (1989), written by Joaquín Oristrell and produced by RTVE, in each of the thirteen episodes. The Torre Europa appears both inside and out in the Spanish film The Weakness of the Bolshevik (2003) by Manuel Martín Cuenca. The outdoor scenes of the 2005 film El método were shot next to Torre Europa.

== Gallery ==
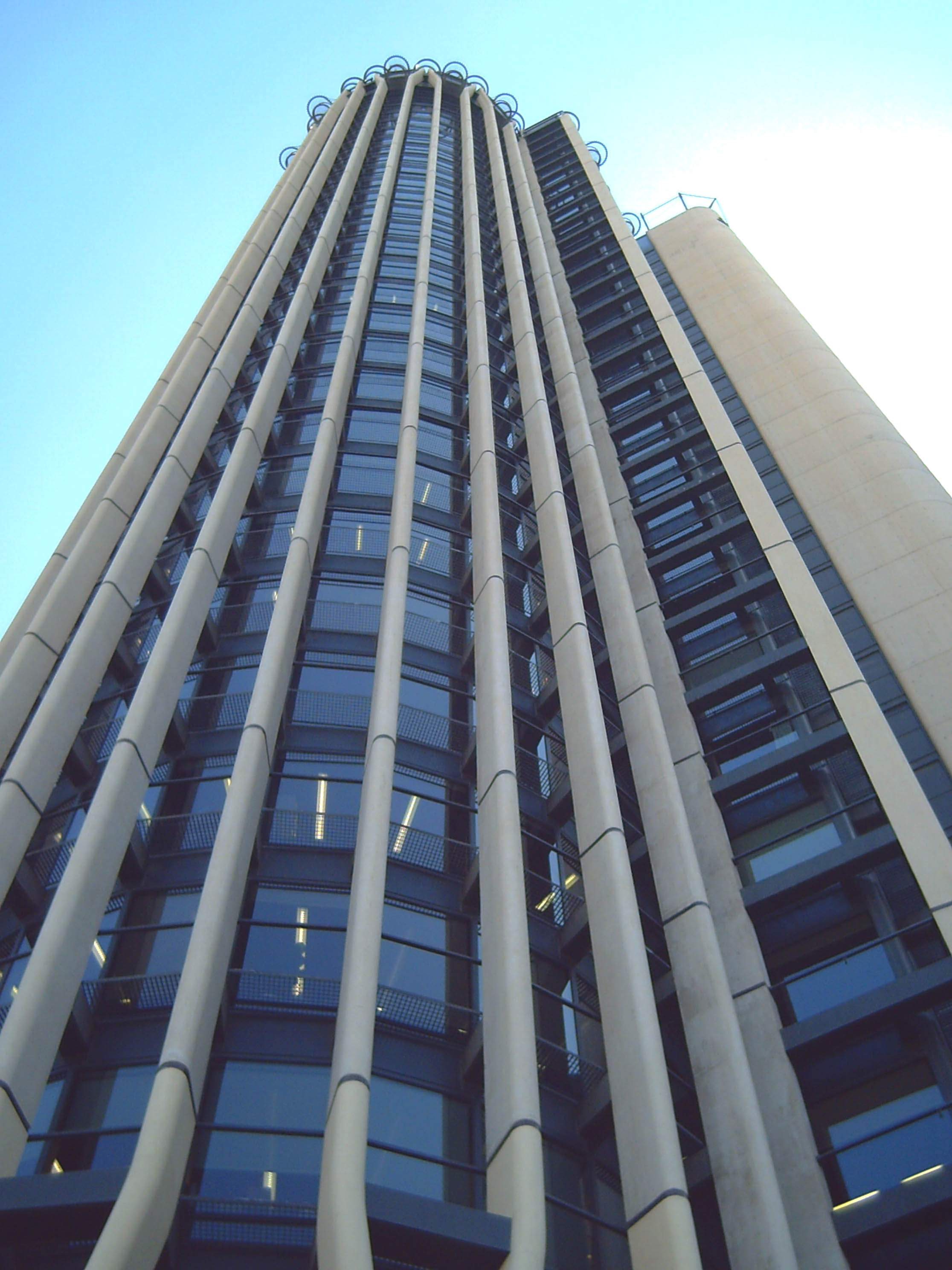
Facade details

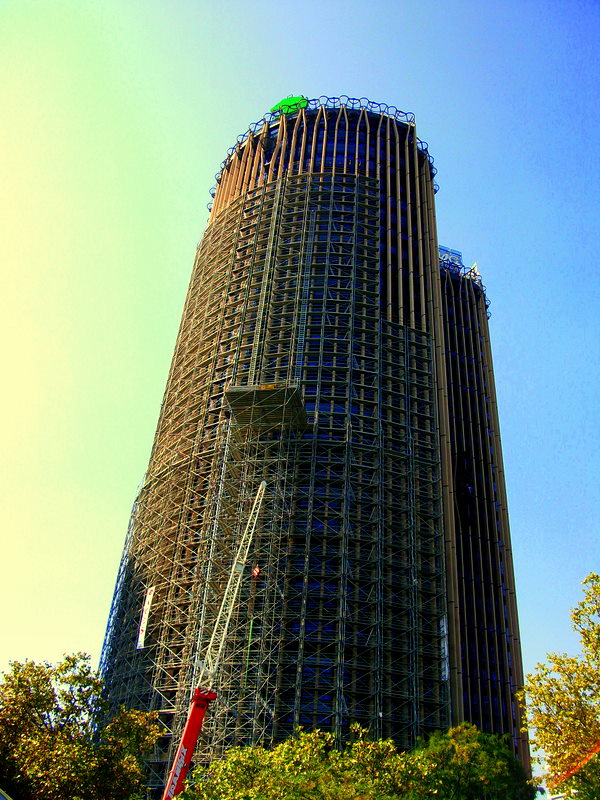
Facade renovation works in 2011

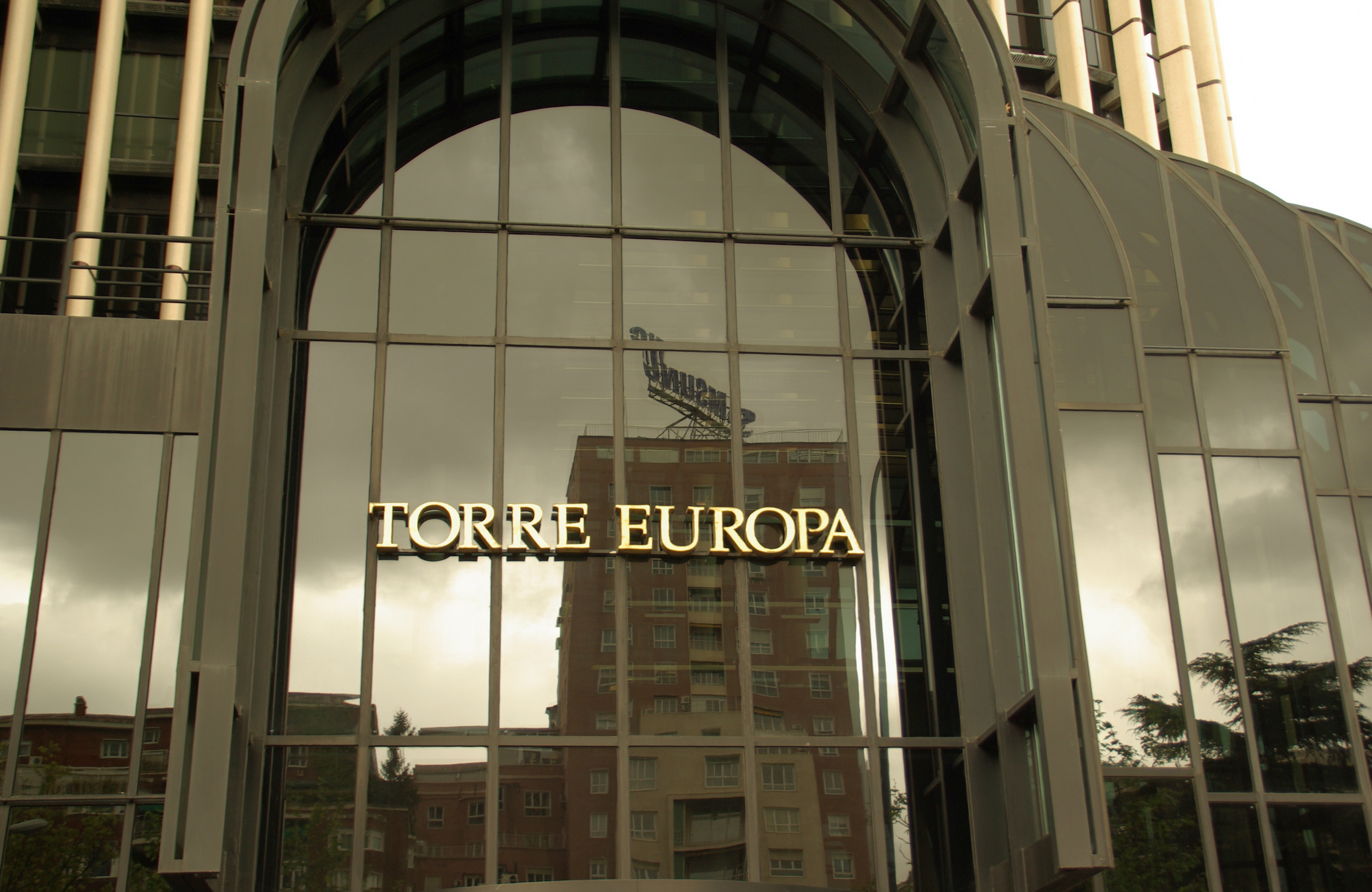
Entrance detail

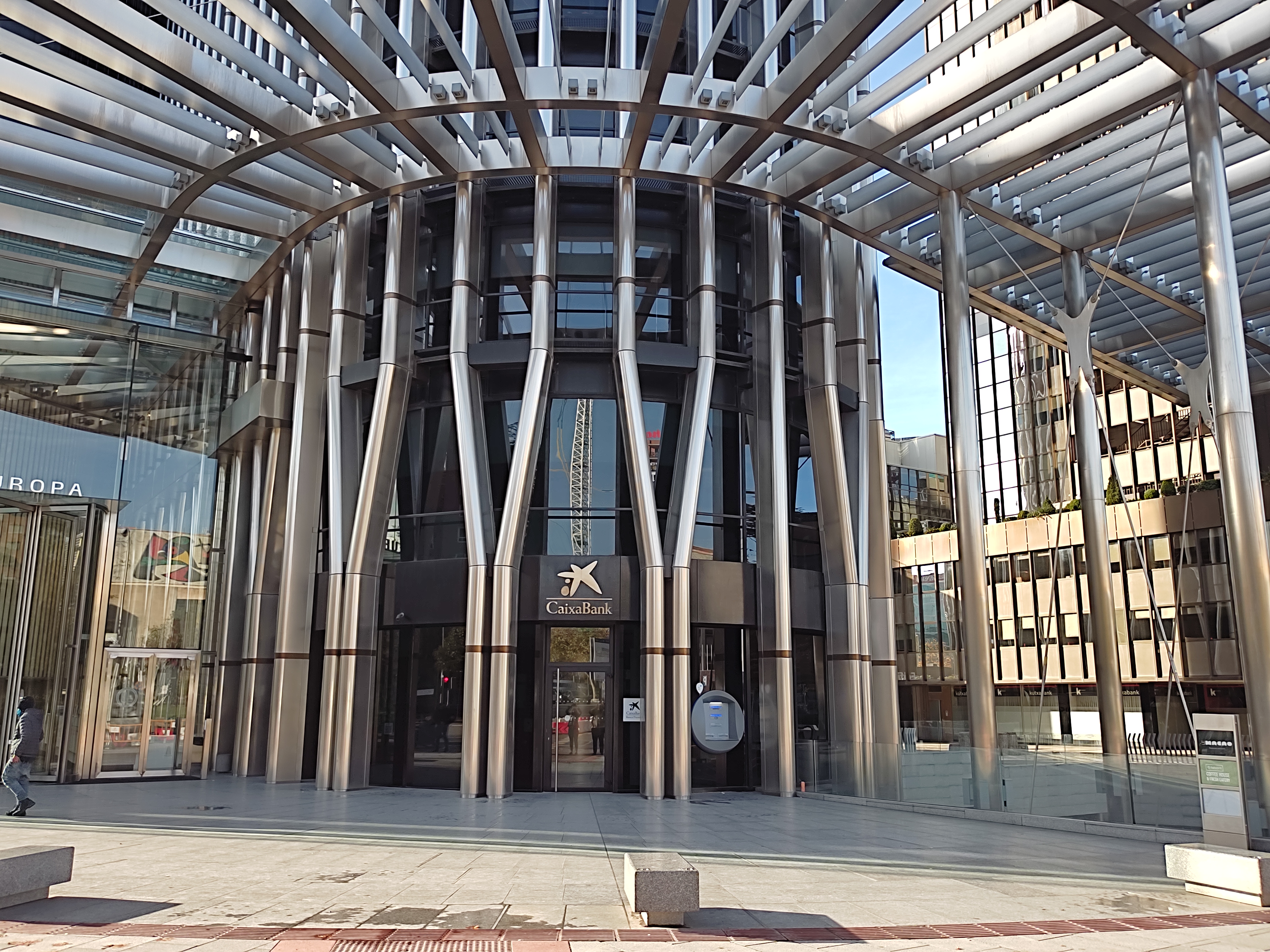
The main entrance after renovation

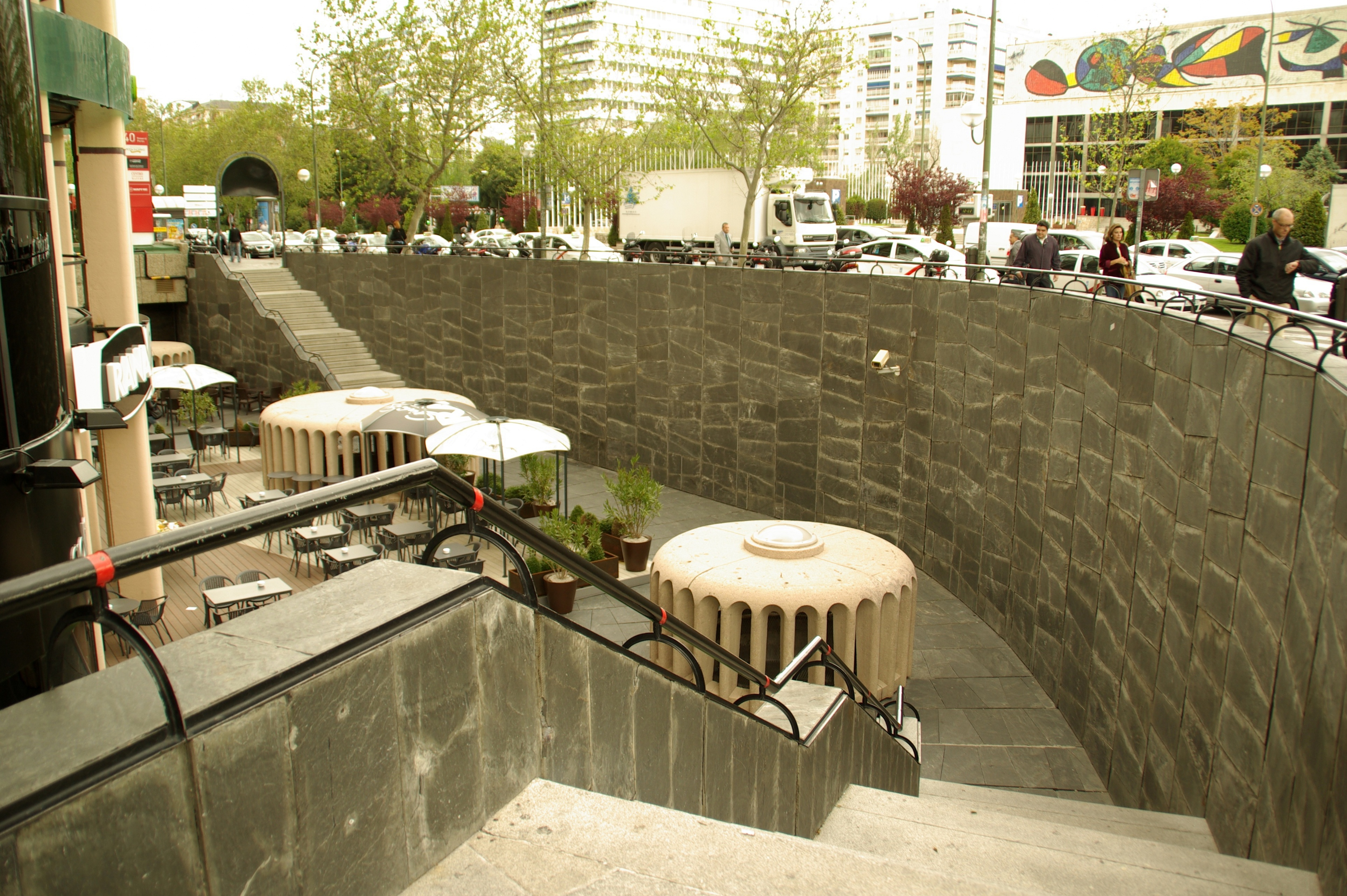
Terraces from the base of the tower

== See also ==
- List of tallest buildings in Spain
- List of tallest buildings in Madrid
