= Castellana 81 =

High-rise building in Madrid

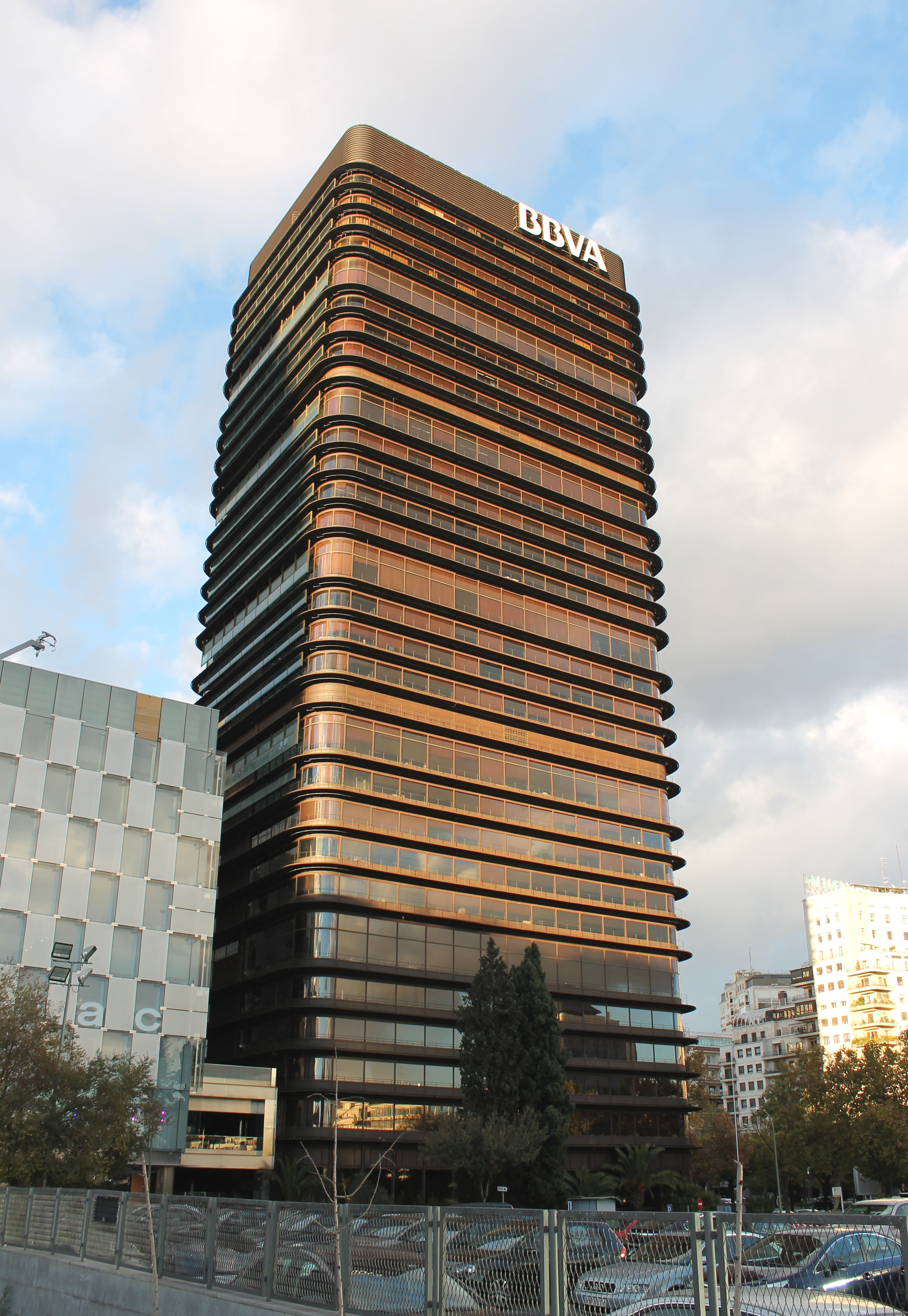
- Facade
- Former names: Banco de Bilbao

General information
- Status: Completed
- Type: Office
- Location: Paseo de la Castellana 81, Madrid, Spain
- Construction started: 1979; 47 years ago
- Completed: 1981; 45 years ago
- Renovated: End2015
- Cost: 2,200 million Pta.
- Renovation cost: €30 million
- Owner: Gmp

Height
- Roof: 107 m (351 ft)

Technical details
- Floor count: 4 below, 32 above
- Floor area: 44,716 m^{2} (481,320 sq ft)
- Lifts/elevators: 14

Design and construction
- Architect: F. J. Sáenz de Oiza
- Developer: Banco de Bilbao
- Structural engineer: Carlos Fdez. Casado
- Main contractor: Entrecanales y Távora, OHL

Renovating team
- Architect: Ruiz Barbarin Arquitectos-Arquimanía
- Main contractor: OHL

Website
- castellana81.com

The Castellana 81 (previously known as Torre BBVA, or, in English, BBVA Tower) is a 107m skyscraper in Madrid, Spain, within the AZCA financial district, and is currently the company's Madrid HQ. It was designed by the Spanish architect Francisco Javier Sáenz de Oiza, who won the private tender in 1971, convoked by the Banco de Bilbao, nowadays BBVA. It was built between 1979 and 1981.

It is one of the most important architectural landmarks of Madrid, with its striking ocher color, more intense as the time passes due to the oxidation of its facade steel. It has a rectangular floor (1,200 m2 per floor) with round corners, and the facade is made of continuous glass and steel, allowing exterior views from every point. The South, East and West facades also have steel sunshades in every floor, contributing to its characteristic look.

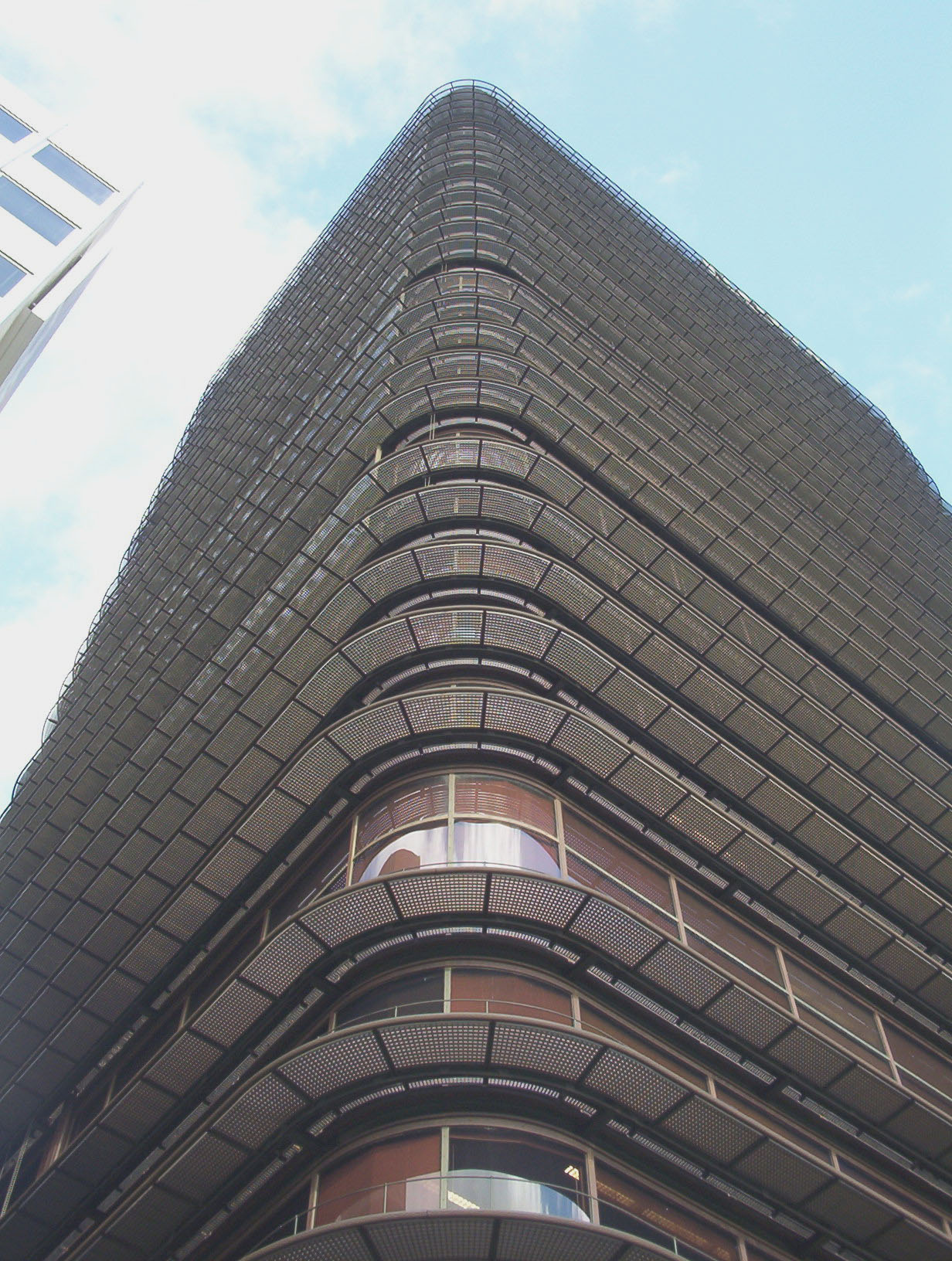
View from the ground.

The building is supported on two concrete cores which also hold the utilities and lift shafts. Around them, the office area is a clear working space without divisions. The building has three staircases connecting every floor plus 14 elevators (divided by vertical zones as well as by uses: public, service, board-of-directors exclusive). The foundation had to be designed having in mind that the underground commuter rail passes right through the lowest basement, having the building "ride" the tunnel. The inner core supports, at regular intervals, six prestressed concrete floor platforms, which in turn support the five steel structure floors above each of them.

The building has 28 working floors, with the five top ones dedicated to the company Board of Directors, containing the cabinet meeting room, many other conference and meeting areas, a private restaurant and relax zones. The first basement also holds the BBVA Auditorium and a public exposition space. There are four main utility floors: Basement 4 and Technical Floors 1 through 3 (located over floors 11, 20 and 28 respectively); The underground parking is located on basements 1, 2 and 3.

In 2007 the bank sold it to the real estate company Gmp, although it still occupies the building.

== See also ==
- List of tallest buildings in Madrid
