= Plaza de Pablo Ruiz Picasso =

Public square in Madrid

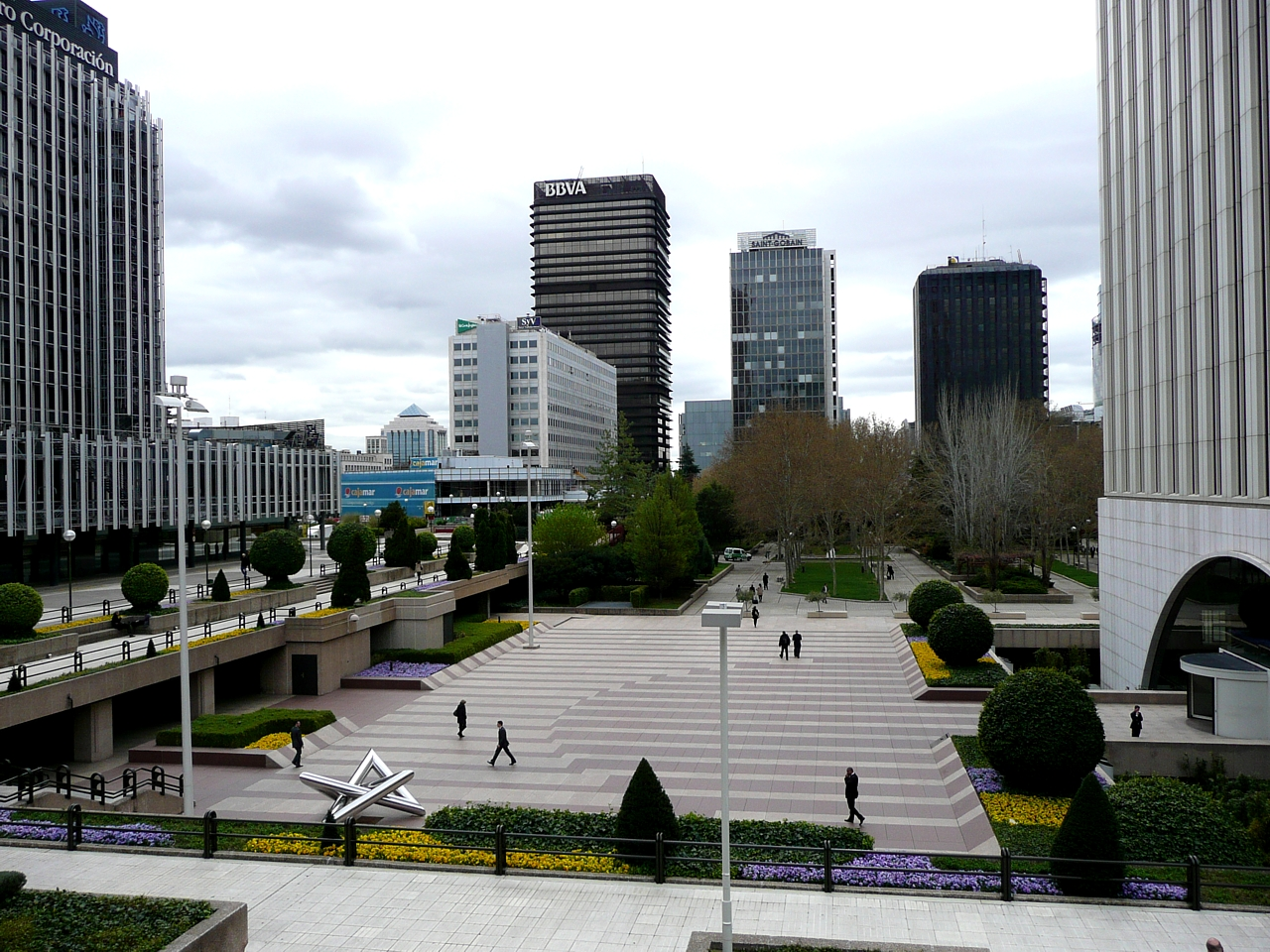
- Namesake: Pablo Ruiz Picasso
- Type: plaza
- Location: Centro, Madrid, Spain
- Coordinates: 40.449291°N 3.693372°W

The plaza de Pablo Ruiz Picasso (also known as Plaza Central de AZCA) is a public square located in Madrid, Spain. It lies at the centre of the AZCA financial district.

== History and description ==
Originally known simply as "plaza de Azca", the square was renamed to "Plaza de Pablo Ruiz Picasso" in April 1980. The decision was approved in the plenary of the ayuntamiento with a near unanimous yes vote. (Note: There were a no vote (from Eduardo Mangada, who deemed the square had nothing to do with Pablo Picasso's work) and one abstention (Javier Tusell, outraged at the Ramón Tamames's proposal to bring the famous Guernica to the square).) Soon after, the municipal architect Joaquín Roldán rushed to build a commemorative monolith (featuring the signature of Picasso), and the square was inaugurated on 31 May 1980.

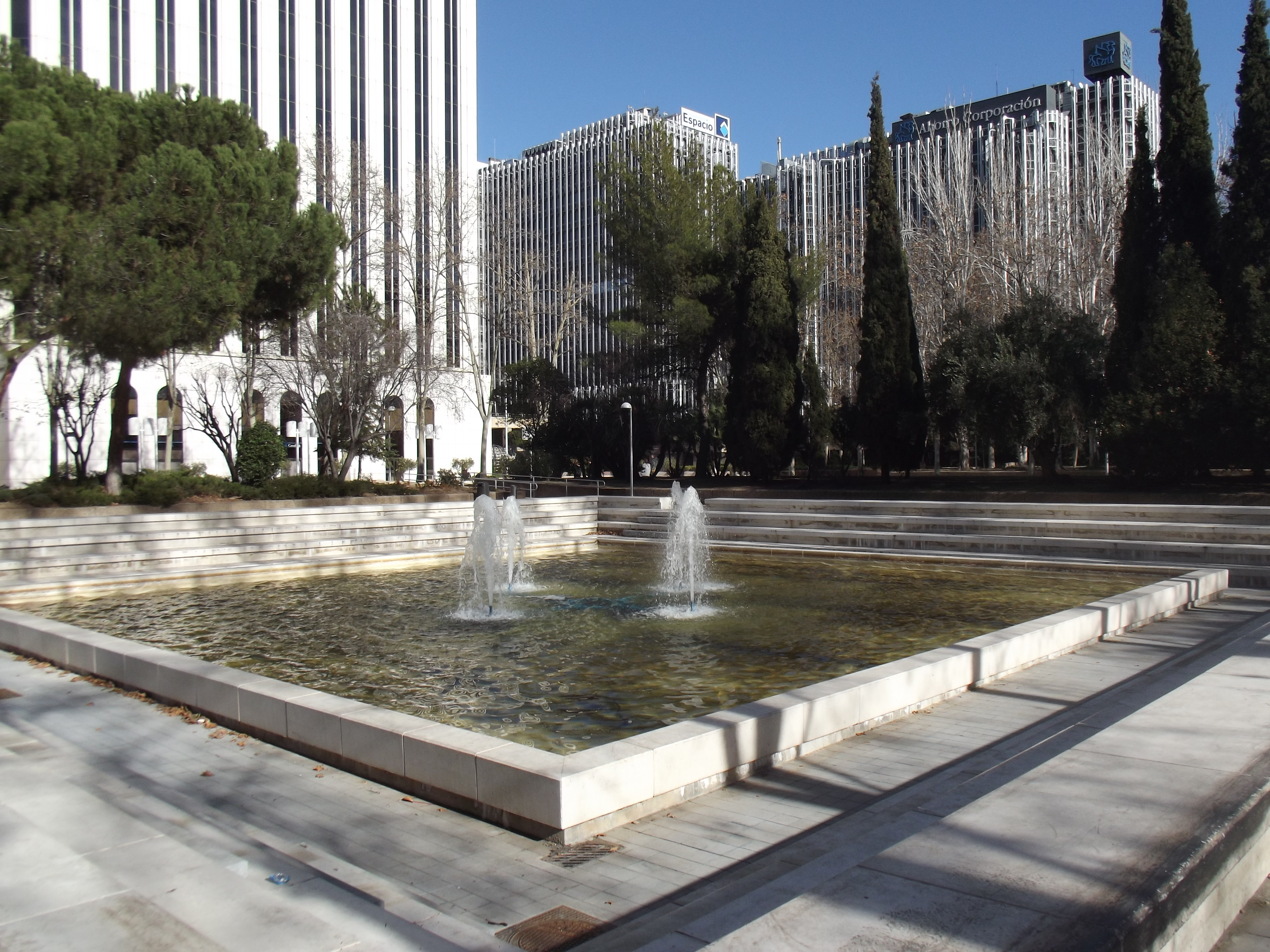
Pond

In July 2019, the new municipal government signed an agreement with Merlin Properties seeking to improve the square and its surroundings.

It is part of the AZCA financial district (itself located in the Cuatro Caminos neighborhood and the Tetuán administrative district). It has a direct access to the Paseo de la Castellana, the rest of links to the neighbouring streets involve stairs, ramps and gloomy underground passages.^{p. 4} A maze of underground roads runs below the square.

The tree population comprises specimens of Cedrus atlantica, Cedrus deodara and Taxus baccata,^{pp. 4–5} while regarding the arbutus flora, the area also features Pittosporum tobira, Nerium oleander and juniperus.^{p. 4}

Besides the vegetation, the plaza includes two "false" mini-plazas within, one with a square pond in the middle and the other formed by bleachers around a sand pit.^{p. 4}
