= Cáseda =

Municipality in Spain

Coordinates: 42°31′N 1°22′W

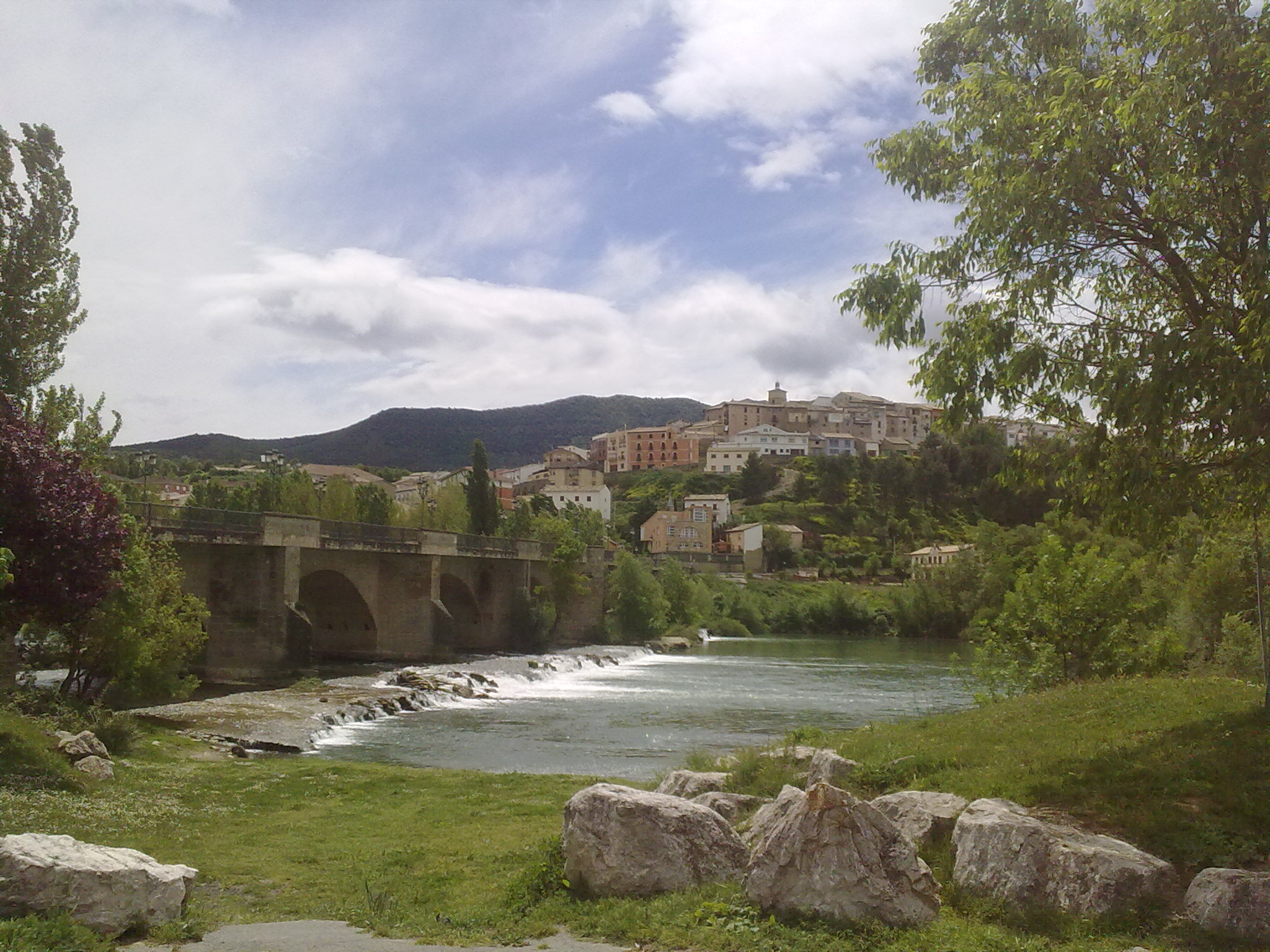
Town of Caseda and the Aragon river

Cáseda's flag

Cáseda's coat of arms

Cáseda is a town and municipality located in the province and autonomous community of Navarre, northern Spain.
