= Windsor Tower =

Former office building in Madrid, Spain

Torre Windsor
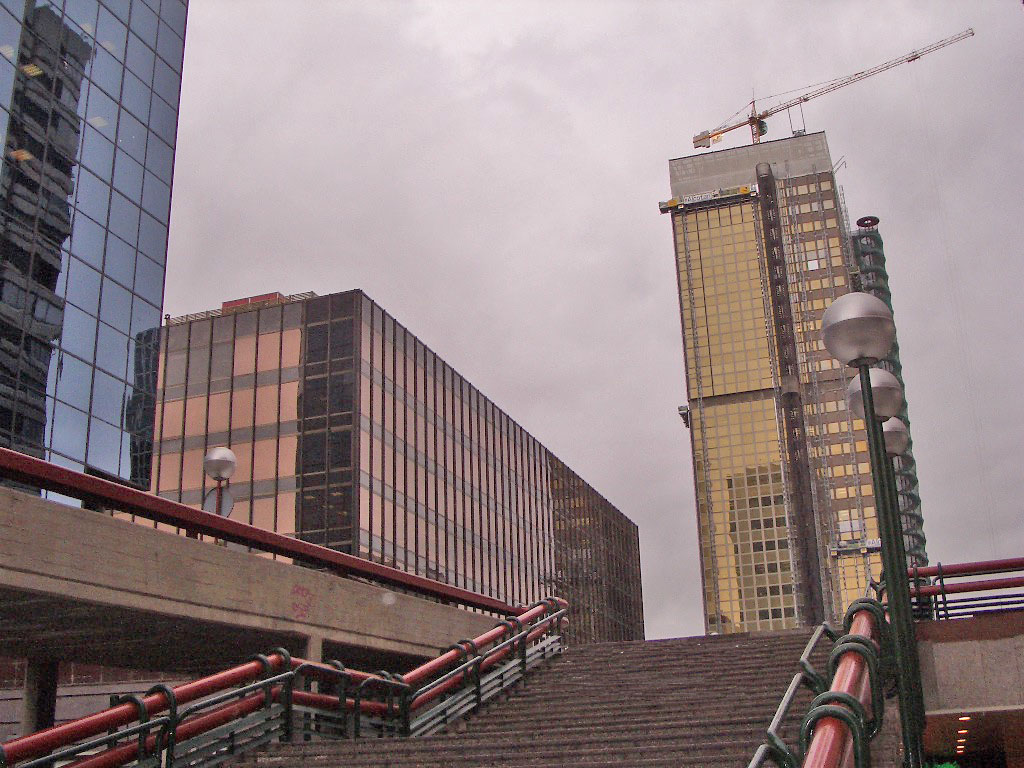
- Windsor Tower (right) in 2004

General information
- Status: Destroyed
- Type: Office
- Location: C/Raimundo Fdez. Villaverde 65, Madrid, Spain
- Coordinates: 40°26′49″N 3°41′40″W
- Construction started: 1975; 51 years ago
- Completed: 1979; 47 years ago
- Destroyed: 12 February 2005; 21 years ago
- Owner: Ason Inmobiliaria

Height
- Roof: 106 m (348 ft)

Technical details
- Floor count: 3 below, 29 above

Design and construction
- Architect: Gabinete Alas-Casariego

The Windsor Tower (Spanish: Torre Windsor) was an office building in the financial center of Madrid, Spain. Built in 1979, it was 106 m (348 ft) high and had 32 floors of which 29 were above ground level and 3 below. The building was gutted by a huge fire on 12 February 2005 and partially collapsed. At the time of the fire, it was the eighth tallest building in Madrid. It has since been demolished.

== Characteristics of the building ==
The building, located at Calle Raimundo Fernández Villaverde 65, had a total area of approximately 21,000 square metres (230,000 sq ft). It was one of the first modern towers in Madrid. The tower was designed in 1974 by a team of six Spanish architects: Genaro Alas Rodríguez, Pedro Casariego Hernández Vaquero, Luis Alemany Indarte, Rafael Alemany Indarte, Ignacio Ferrero Ruiz de la Prada, and Manuel del Río Martínez. It was constructed between 1975 and 1979.

Its distinctive appearance was due to its elemental geometry, lacking composite elements. Its façade was completely covered by reflective glass-like panels that mirrored the sky of Madrid, diminishing its visual impact. The structure was divided into two halves by a mechanical floor without windows. It was a very solid building, with a central core of reinforced concrete that resisted the high temperatures of the fire without collapsing. The building did not have a fire sprinkler system. Sprinklers were being retrofitted, but they were not yet operable when the building was destroyed by fire.

== Fire ==
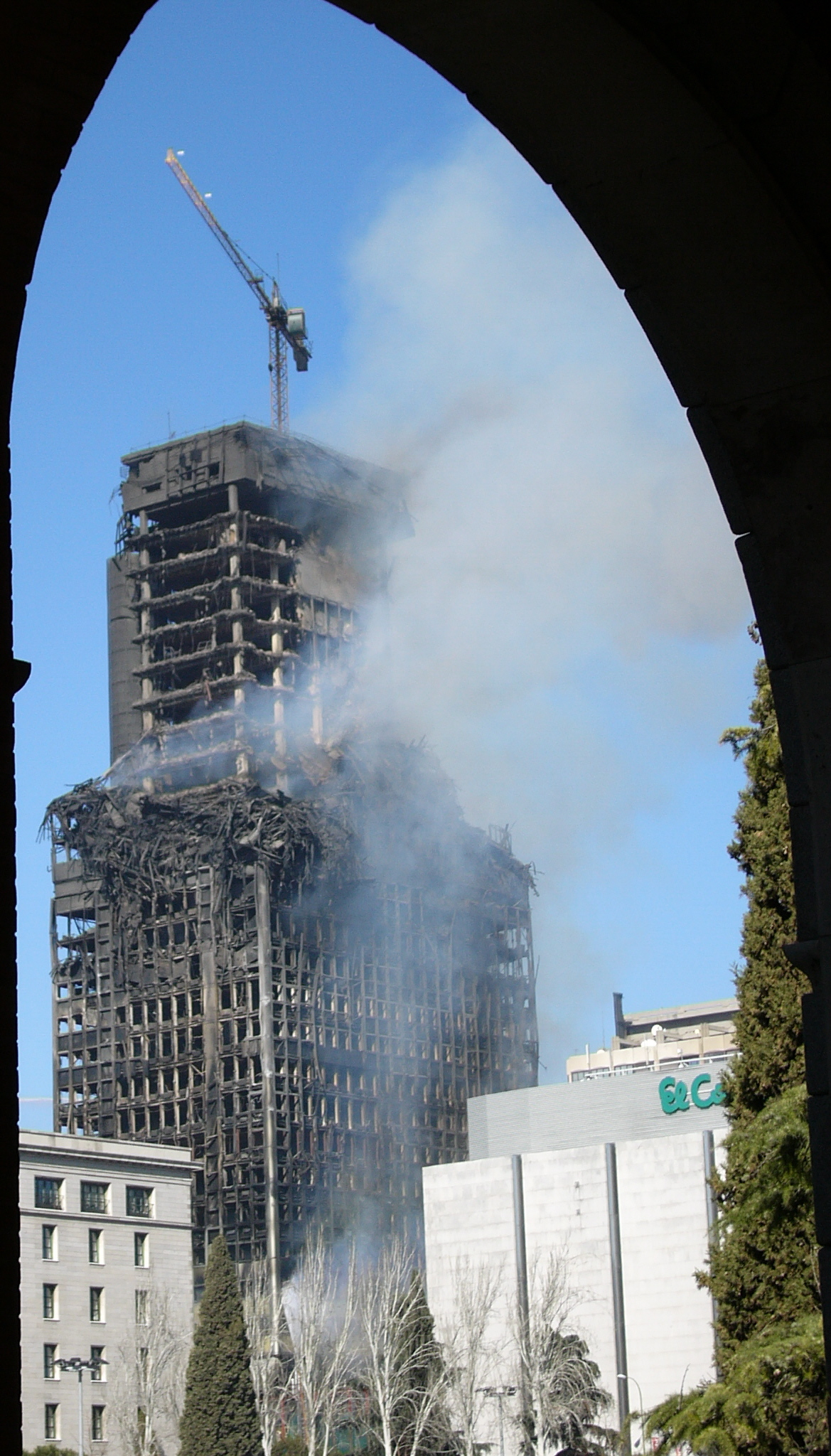
Windsor Tower on 13 February 2005

Around midnight, on 12 February 2005, a fire was detected on the 21st floor of the building. The fire spread quickly throughout the entire building, leading to the collapse of the outermost, steel parts of the upper floors. As the fire continued into the following day, the tower surroundings were closed off, causing disruption for the city commuters in the area. It took firefighters about 24 hours to extinguish the fire. In the aftermath, seven firefighters were injured, but nobody was killed during the disaster. However, the building was a total loss and the disaster was regarded by multiple news outlets as one of the "great fires" in Madrid's history. The fire was blamed on an electrical fault.

The city council of Madrid covered the cost of demolishing the remains of the building, which was 17 million euros (about US$21 million) in 2005. Demolition work began in March 2005 and was completed in August that year. A 23-story replacement called Torre Titania was built from 2007 to 2011.

== See also ==
- Skyscraper fire
