= Torre Titania =

Skyscraper in Madrid, Spain

Coordinates: 40.4468°N 3.6945°W

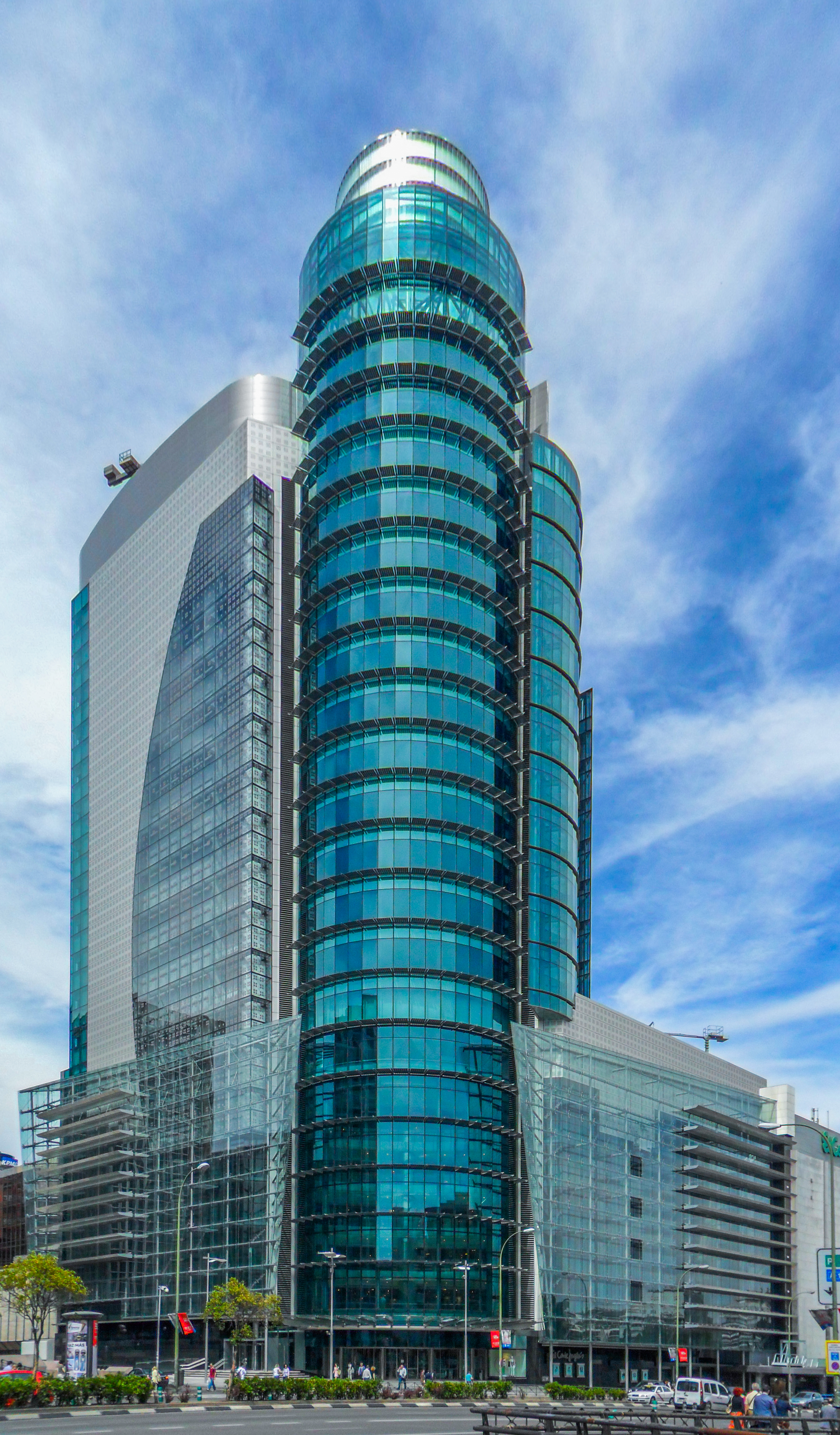

General information
- Status: Completed
- Type: Commercial
- Location: C/Raimundo Fdez. Villaverde 65, Madrid, Spain
- Construction started: 2007; 19 years ago
- Completed: 2013; 13 years ago

Height
- Roof: 104 m (341 ft)

Technical details
- Floor count: 23

Design and construction
- Architects: Pablo Muñoz; Pedro Vilata

Torre Titania is the twelfth-tallest skyscraper in Madrid, Spain and has become the country's largest mall.

Construction began in mid-2007, on the site previously occupied by the Windsor Tower, which was destroyed in a fire in 2005. The building is on Calle Raimundo Fernández Villaverde, opposite to the Nuevos Ministerios Station and very close to the Paseo de la Castellana, in the AZCA district.

The interior, which houses stores El Corte Inglés, was completed in October 2011, and the facade in late 2013. It has 23 floors and a height of 104 metres (341 ft).
