= Simcoe =

Simcoe may refer to:

== Geography ==
=== Canada ===
- Simcoe, Ontario, a town in southwestern Ontario, near Lake Erie
- Simcoe County, a county in central Ontario
- Simcoe Island, an island in Lake Ontario
- Lake Simcoe, a lake in central Ontario
- Simcoe North (federal electoral district), a federal and provincial electoral district in Ontario
- Former federal electoral districts in the province of Ontario:
  - Simcoe South
  - Simcoe East
  - Simcoe Centre

=== Elsewhere ===
- Fort Simcoe, a former United States Army fort preserved as a state park near White Swan, Washington
- Simcoe, Missouri, a community in the United States
- Simcoe Mountains, an extinct volcanic region near Goldendale, Washington

== People ==
- Simcoe (surname)

== Others ==
- Simcoe (ship), a list of ships named "Simcoe"
- Governor Simcoe Secondary School, a high school in St. Catharines, Ontario, Canada
- Simcoe brand YCR 14 cv, a hop variety (Humulus lupulus)
- Simcoe Hall, an administrative building of the University of Toronto

== See also ==
- Governor Simcoe (disambiguation)
- Simco (disambiguation)
- SIMCOS, a computer language and a development environment for computer simulation
