= Simco =

Simco or SIMCO may refer to:

- Ladislav Šimčo (born 1967), Slovak footballer and manager
- Riff Raff (rapper) (born Horst Simco; 1982), American rapper
- Sea ice microbial communities (SIMCO)
- Simco, a European real estate company acquired by Gecina
- Simco Ltd., British entertainment company owned by Simon Cowell and doing business as SYCO Music
- Simco Ltd., Auburn Hills, MI 48326 USA, Specialty Innovative Manufacturing Company

== See also ==
- SIMCOS, a computer language
- SIMS Co., Ltd., a video game company
- Simcoe (disambiguation)
- Samco (disambiguation)
