= Metrovacesa =

Real estate company

- Native name: Metrovacesa, S.A.
- Company type: Public (BMAD: MVC)
- Industry: Real Estate
- Founded: 1989
- Headquarters: Puerto de Somport Street, 23, 28050, Madrid, Spain
- Products: Hotel Commercial area Office building
- Number of employees: 100
- Website: metrovacesa.com/en

Metrovacesa is one of the largest real estate developers in Spain. Its main activity focuses on the development and sale of residential properties, complemented by the execution of commercial projects and active land management. Metrovacesa offers a wide variety of new residential developments and commercial premises throughout the country, covering major cities, tourist destinations, and high-potential urban areas.

The company has been listed on the Continuous Market since 2018. Between 2019 and 2023, following its return to the stock market, the company distributed a total of €522 million in dividends to its shareholders.

Its headquarters are located in Madrid. The company's activity is focused on provinces such as Madrid, Barcelona, Valencia, and Málaga, where it holds a significant land bank for residential project development.

The company's chairman is Ignacio Moreno Martínez, and its CEO is Jorge Pérez de Leza Eguiguren.

== History ==
=== Origin ===
Metrovacesa traces its origins to the Compañía Urbanizadora Metropolitana, founded in 1918, which was responsible for developing the Cuatro Caminos neighborhood in Madrid following the inauguration of the Madrid Metropolitan Railway, or Metro de Madrid. The company carried out a broad and complex plan with three distinct projects: urbanizing the area, designing streets and creating infrastructure; constructing rental housing buildings; and developing a garden city aimed at upper-class residents.

From this period, notable buildings include the so-called Titanic buildings on Avenida Reina Victoria, designed as a boulevard and inspired by New York-style architecture. In 1934, with the introduction of the Salmón Law to revive the real estate market, the Compañía Urbanizadora Metropolitana adapted to the times by transitioning into a real estate company. A sister company, Compañía Inmobiliaria Metropolitana, was created, and new housing projects were designed for Avenida Reina Victoria in Madrid and its surroundings.

=== 1940s ===
Among the projects completed in the 1940s, the most significant was the Lope de Vega building, a full block on Madrid's Gran Vía, comprising several structures with uniform façades and designs. It included two hotels, a theater, apartments, offices, and even a rooftop swimming pool. On the lower levels, a luxury shopping center known as "Los Sótanos" operated until the 1980s. In 1946, Inmobiliaria Vasco-Central (Vacesa) was established to acquire land and develop properties for lease. Additionally, Bami, S.A. Inmobiliaria de Construcciones y Terrenos, linked to Banco Mercantil Industrial, was founded to promote housing for sale.

=== 1950s and 1960s ===
With Spain's admission to the United Nations in the mid-1950s, the country embarked on a modernization effort. With this goal in mind, the Compañía Inmobiliaria Metropolitana planned a massive skyscraper-like building at the far end of Madrid's Gran Vía. Emulating the American style of self-sufficient mini-cities, the structure incorporated shopping passages, hotels, apartments, offices, restaurants, and a rooftop swimming pool. This vision materialized in 1953 with the construction of the Edificio España. Between November 1954 and January 1960, a second skyscraper, the Torre de Madrid, was built. In 1968, the Compañía Inmobiliaria Metropolitana planned a significant new project in the area, the so-called Triángulo de Princesa.

=== 1970s ===
In 1973, following an agreement with El Corte Inglés, the Compañía Inmobiliaria Metropolitana began constructing a complex between Madrid's Princesa and Alberto Aguilera streets, which included a hotel, offices, and parking facilities, inaugurated in 1976. In 1977, the company built its first office building north of Paseo de la Castellana in Madrid, in what would soon become known as the AZCA area, adjacent to Vacesa's construction. By the mid-1970s, discussions about a merger between Vacesa and the Compañía Inmobiliaria Metropolitana began, culminating in their merger in 1989.

=== 1980s: The Birth of Metrovacesa ===
In 1982, Vacesa constructed the Sollube building in Plaza Carlos Trías Bertrán in Madrid. Adjacent to it, the Compañía Inmobiliaria Metropolitana built another building, later sold to the Holiday Inn hotel group. In 1989, Metrovacesa was born from the merger of Compañía Urbanizadora Metropolitana, Compañía Inmobiliaria Metropolitana, and Inmobiliaria Vasco-Central. The new company primarily focused on asset management and leasing, while also adding residential development projects for sale. Metrovacesa maintained its interest in acquiring and urbanizing land while expanding its investment into new areas such as shopping centers, business and industrial parks, parking facilities, and the renovation of central urban buildings. The expansion of public transportation and improvements to traditional communication routes supported its focus on peripheral and suburban areas.

=== 1990s ===
The 1990s brought new consumer habits, residential developments, and widespread urban expansion. Metrovacesa responded by designing new shopping centers, some of which remain part of its portfolio today. Notable examples include Thader in Murcia, El Saler in Valencia, Artea in Vizcaya, and Tres Aguas in Alcorcón. These projects have received awards from the Spanish Association of Shopping Centers (AECC) and the International Council of Shopping Centers (ICSC).

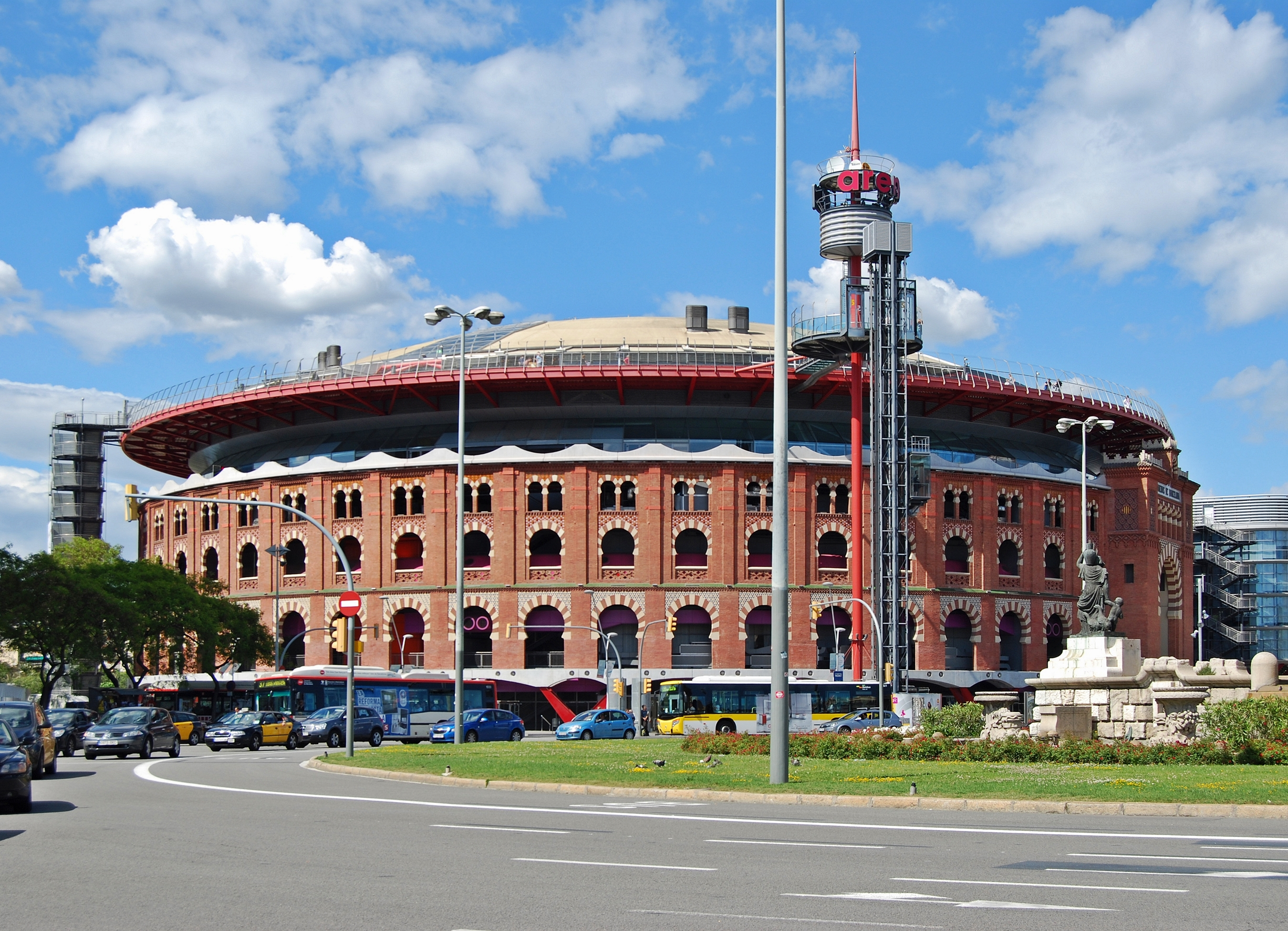
Las Arenas, a mall in Barcelona developed by Metrovacesa (2013).

=== 2000-present ===
In 2003, following the absorption of Bami, Metrovacesa became the largest real estate group in Spain, consolidating its international position with the acquisition of 30% of the leading French real estate company Gecina in 2005, a stake that later exceeded 60%.

During the 2008 financial crisis, major banks became the company's majority shareholders. Metrovacesa then refocused its strategy on asset management in offices, shopping centers, and hotels, as well as on exploiting new assets and inaugurating the Arenas de Barcelona shopping center.

At the end of 2012, Metrovacesa's main shareholders—Grupo Santander, BBVA, Banco Sabadell, and Banco Popular, supported by Bankia—launched a takeover bid to delist the company's shares from the stock market. After fifty years of trading, Metrovacesa left the Madrid Stock Exchange on May 13, 2013.

In mid-2014, Metrovacesa sold its stake in the French real estate company Gecina, marking the beginning of a new strategic phase. By the end of 2014, Grupo Santander acquired Bankia's 19% stake in Metrovacesa, becoming the majority shareholder.

On February 6, 2018, Metrovacesa returned to the stock market, debuting at a price of €16.5 per share after reducing its initial starting price. The share price reached a maximum of €15.24 and a minimum of €14.97, closing at €14.97 per share at 2:29 PM. At that time, its focus shifted toward the residential development sector.

Between 2016 and 2017, a spin-off of assets was transferred to MERLIN Properties, representing a completely renewed focus on the residential development sector. During this period, Banco Santander, BBVA, and Banco Popular contributed assets valued at €1.097 billion

Following its stock market return, Metrovacesa distributed a total of €522 million in dividends to its shareholders between 2019 and 2023.

== Shareholders ==
Capital Stock	Shareholders Participation
Grupo Santander	49,36 %
FCyC	21,21 %
BBVA	20,85 %
Quasar Investments	3,95 %
Management team	0,28 %
Treasury stock	0,11 %
Others	4,23 %
