= Torre de Madrid =

Skyscraper in Madrid

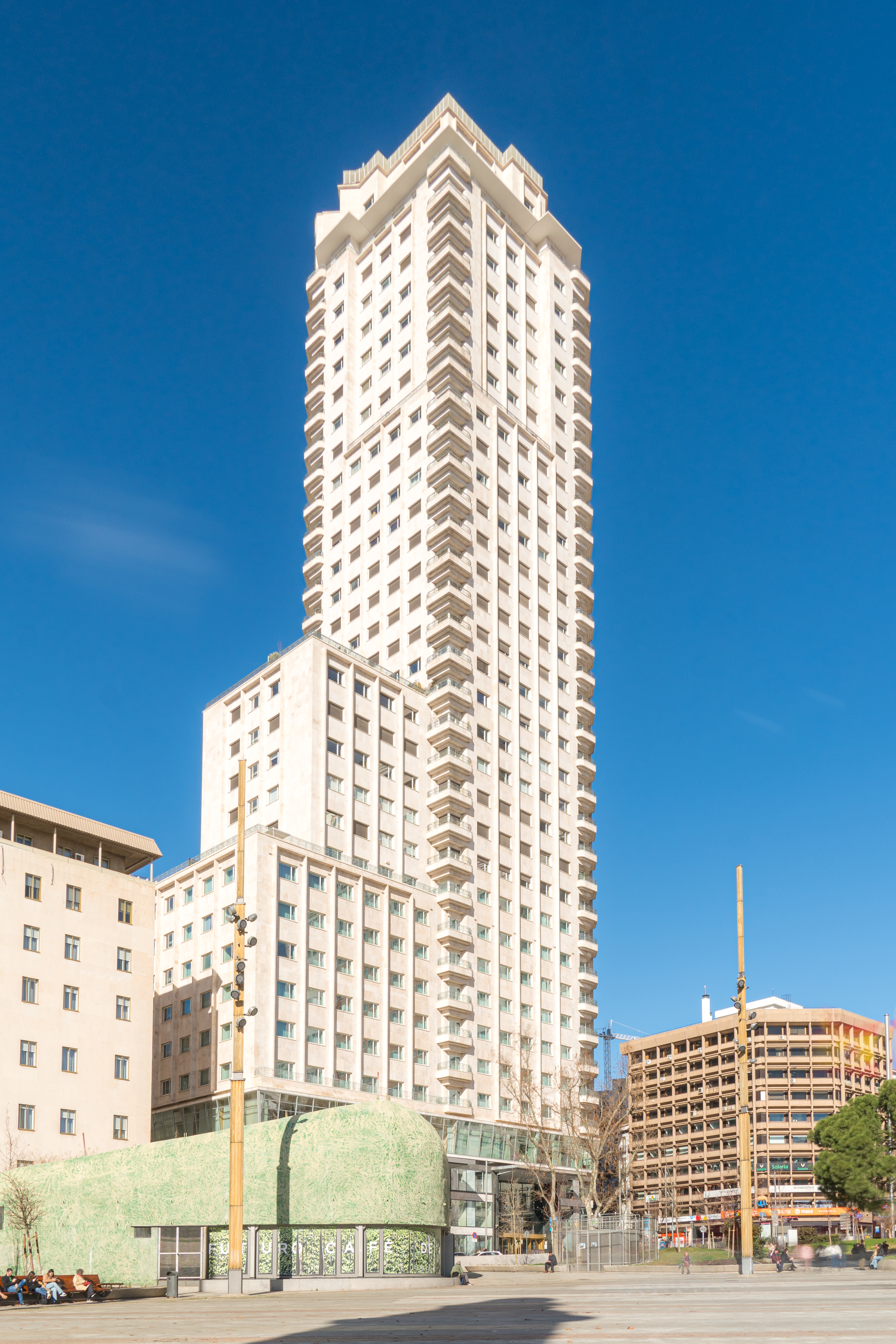

General information
- Status: Completed
- Type: Residential, Office
- Location: Plaza de España Madrid, Spain
- Coordinates: 40°25′28″N 3°42′44″W
- Construction started: 1954
- Completed: 1957
- Opening: October 15, 1957
- Owner: Metrovacesa

Height
- Antenna spire: 162 m (531 ft)
- Roof: 142 m (466 ft)

Technical details
- Floor count: 37
- Lifts/elevators: 12

Design and construction
- Architect: Julio Otamendi
- Developer: Compañía Inmobiliaria Metropolitana
- Structural engineer: Joaquín Otamendi

The Torre de Madrid (English: Tower of Madrid) is a mixed-use skyscraper in Madrid. It measures 142 metres in height, has 36 floors and was constructed between 1954 and 1957. It was designed by the architects Julián and José María Otamendi Machimbarrena as an assignment of the Metropolitan Real Estate Agency, for whom they had already built the Edificio España.

It is situated on the Plaza de España, being a symbolic building for the plaza and the city. It holds offices and apartments. It was the highest office building in Western Europe until 1967, when it was surpassed by the 150-metre high South Tower in Brussels. The Tower appeared in numerous Spanish movies released in the 1960s.

The tower was conceived to be the tallest concrete building in the world at the time of its completion and until the construction of Torrespaña was the highest building in Madrid. The lead architects also envisioned that the building would harbour 500 stores, spacious galleries, a hotel, and even a cinema. Furthermore, the tower was equipped with twelve elevators of the fastest model of the time, permitting users to travel 3.5 metres per second. The works were finished on October 15, 1957.

The Tower of Madrid is found in the Plaza de España, at the end of the street of Gran Via, in the heart of the Spanish capital. Along with the 117-metre-tall Edificio de España, situated in the same plaza, they form an interesting architectural assembly. Both enjoy protection on the part of the City Hall of the capital. It was the tallest building in Spain until 1982, when it was surpassed by the Torrespaña telecommunications tower.

On April 28, 2005, the tower was put up for sale by the real estate agency Metrovacesa along with the Edificio España to vote part of the acquisition of the French company Gecina. The price was about 400.000.000 €.

The building was redeveloped in 2012 with apartments on floors 10-32, while the Hotel Barceló Torre de Madrid opened on floors 1-9 in 2017.

== In popular culture ==
The building is depicted in 1984 movie The Hit. A part of it is shot in an apartment in one of the upmost floors and its balcony.

== See also ==
- List of tallest buildings in Madrid
- Hotel Barceló Torre de Madrid official website
- Hotel Barceló Torre de Madrid on Yelp
