= Edificio España =

Skyscraper and hotel in Madrid, Spain

Hotel Riu Plaza España
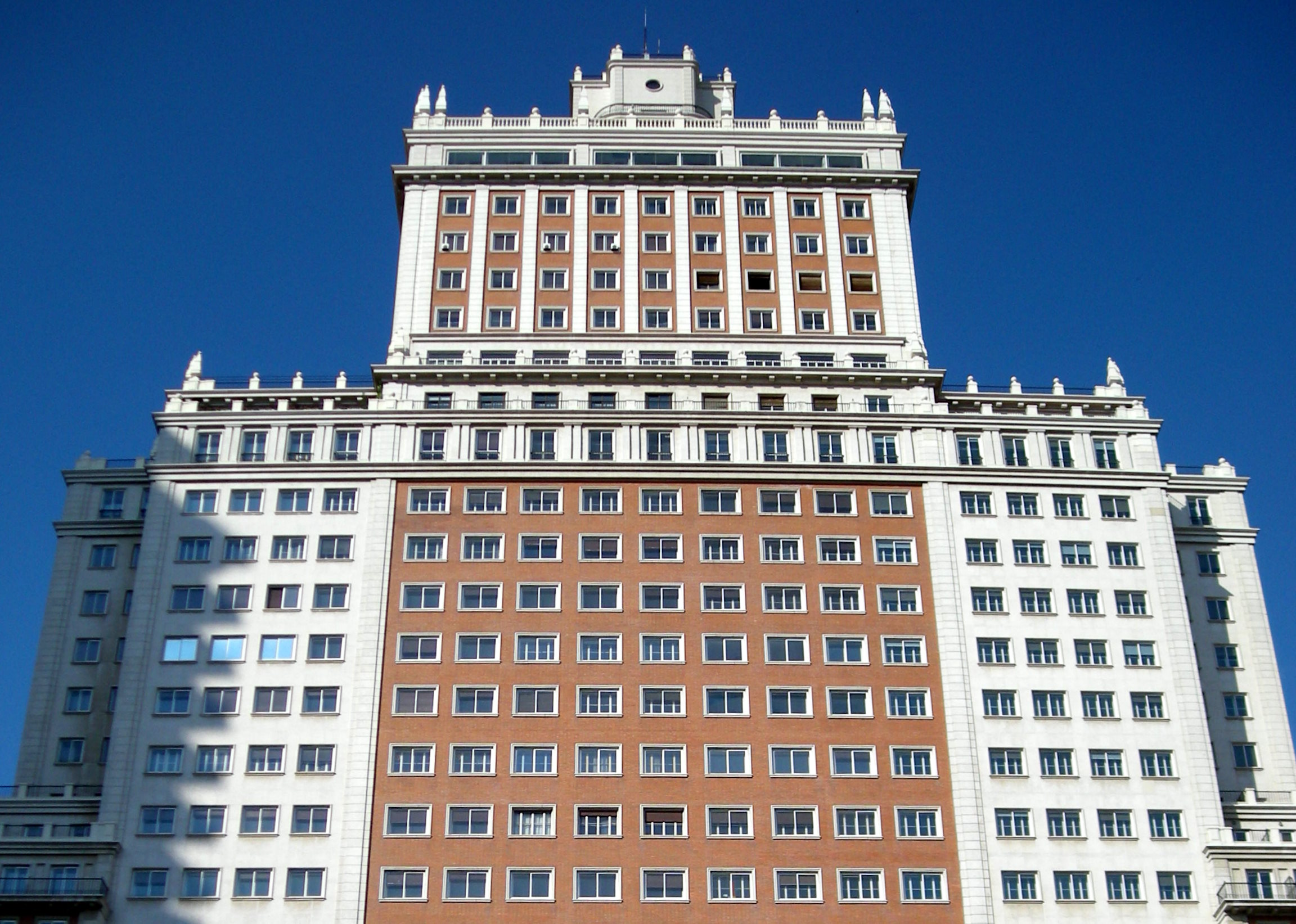
- Edificio España from Plaza de España
- Interactive map of the Hotel Riu Plaza España area
- Alternative names: Edificio España; Hotel Plaza; Crowne Plaza Madrid City Centre

General information
- Status: Completed
- Type: Hotel; originally mixed-use
- Architectural style: Neo-Herrerian, Neo-Baroque and Art Deco
- Location: Plaza de España, Madrid, Spain, Calle de la Princesa, 19
- Coordinates: 40°25′27″N 3°42′43″W
- Completed: 1953
- Opened: October 1953
- Renovated: 2005–2010; 2017–2019
- Cost: ₧200 million
- Owner: Riu Hotels & Resorts

Height
- Architectural: 107 m (351 ft)
- Roof: 117 m (384 ft)

Technical details
- Floor count: 26
- Floor area: 77,000 m^{2} (830,000 sq ft)
- Lifts/elevators: 32

Design and construction
- Architect: Julián Otamendi
- Developer: Compañía Inmobiliaria Metropolitana
- Structural engineer: José María Otamendi

Hotel Riu Plaza España, commonly known by its historic name Edificio España (English: Spain Building), is a skyscraper and hotel in Madrid, Spain. It stands in Plaza de España, at the western end of Gran Vía. The building opened in 1953 as the Edificio España, a mixed-use complex containing a hotel, offices, apartments and shops.

The building is commonly listed as 117 m (384 ft) tall and has 26 above-ground floors, although The Skyscraper Center records its architectural height as 107 m (351 ft). It was the tallest building in Spain until it was surpassed by the nearby Torre de Madrid, also designed by the Otamendi brothers. Its architecture combines Neo-Herrerian and Neo-Baroque exterior features with Art Deco interior decoration.

The Spanish hotel chain RIU Hotels & Resorts acquired the property in 2017 and refurbished it as a hotel. It reopened in August 2019 as the four-star Hotel Riu Plaza España, the first Riu Plaza urban hotel in Spain.

== History ==
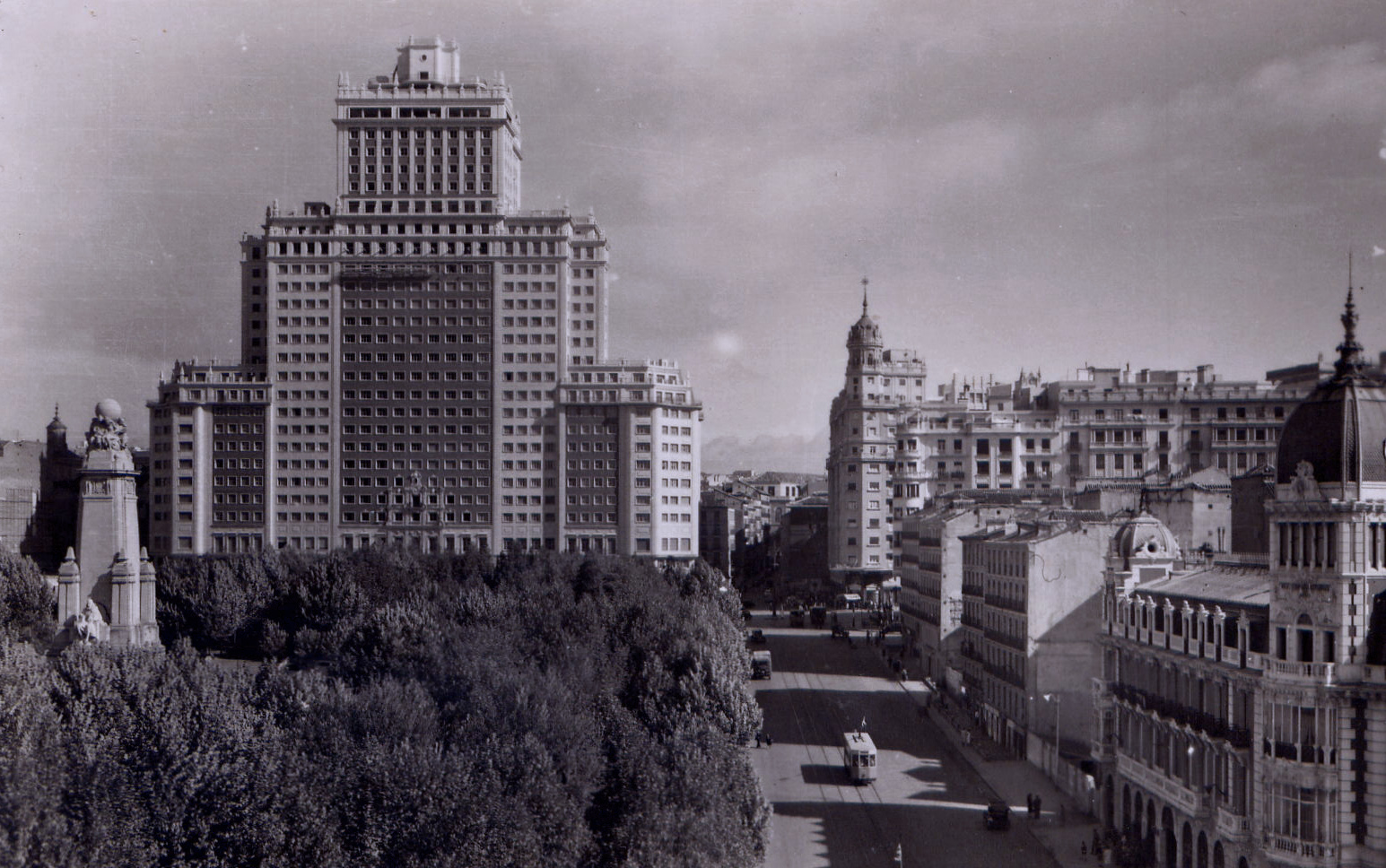
The Edificio España in the 1950s

=== Construction and early use ===
Construction began in 1948 on a site forming the corner of Plaza de España and Calle de la Princesa. The work was promoted by Compañía Inmobiliaria Metropolitana, later associated with Metrovacesa, and employed an average of about 500 workers per day. The Hotel Plaza, the original hotel within the building, was inaugurated in October 1953. The garden terrace on the 26th floor opened on 9 July 1954. By 1955, the building was reported to accommodate more than 4,500 people on an ordinary day.

The reinforced-concrete structure was calculated by José María Otamendi, while Julián Otamendi designed the architectural plans and the Baroque-inspired main entrance. The building has a stepped silhouette divided into four main levels. Its style has been described as Neo-Herrerian with Neo-Baroque features and Art Deco decoration inside.

=== Sale, vacancy and preservation disputes ===
Until the early 21st century, the building housed the Crowne Plaza Madrid City Centre hotel, a shopping centre, apartments and offices. On 28 April 2005, Metrovacesa put the Edificio España and Torre de Madrid up for sale to help finance its acquisition of the French property company Gecina. Santander Real Estate acquired an initial 50% stake in the Edificio España for €138.6 million, with an agreement to acquire the remaining hotel-owned share.

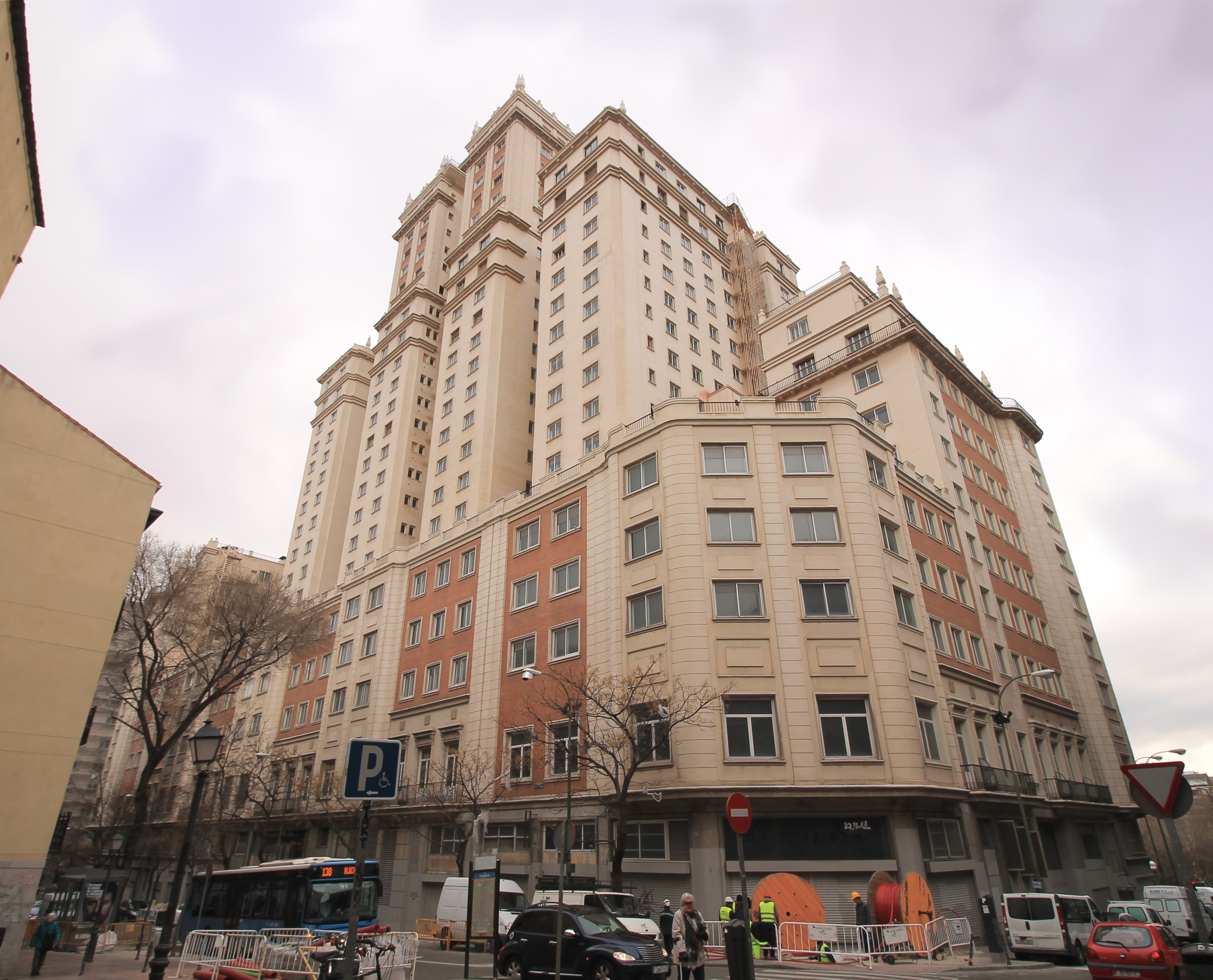
View from the north angle

After the sale to Banco Santander, the façade was refurbished between 2005 and 2010 under the direction of Rubio & Álvarez-Sala. By 2012 the building was closed and had no confirmed use.

In 2014, Santander announced the sale of the building to Wang Jianlin, chairman of the Chinese conglomerate Dalian Wanda Group, for €265 million. The local level of protection was reduced from "level 2, structural grade" to "level 3, partial grade", but Madrid authorities still required the front and side façades to be preserved. Wanda sought to dismantle and rebuild the property while maintaining its façades, whereas the city insisted that works respect the building's protected elements. In 2015, Ecologists in Action filed a legal challenge against the change to Madrid's General Urban Development Plan that had reduced the building's protection.

In July 2016, Wanda reached an agreement to sell the building to the Baraka Group for €272 million. Spanish business press reported in 2017 that Baraka planned to finance the acquisition with its own funds rather than bank debt.

=== Conversion into Hotel Riu Plaza España ===
On 1 June 2017, Baraka, led by Trinitario Casanova, closed its purchase from Wanda and sold the property the same day to Riu Hotels & Resorts. The planned investment for purchase and refurbishment was reported at between €380 million and €400 million. The project made the building the first Spanish property in RIU's Riu Plaza urban-hotel line.

The then mayor of Madrid, Manuela Carmena, publicly welcomed the transaction and said that the existing consolidation permit allowed work to start immediately. Earlier that year, Madrid City Council had taken part in an informational visit to the building with Baraka and heritage and environmental groups to explain the proposed works.

After the necessary permits were obtained, refurbishment works began on 23 October 2017. The project initially envisaged a four-star hotel with 589 rooms and 15 meeting rooms. Its upper floors were planned to include terraces, a swimming pool and panoramic sky-bar spaces.

Riu and Baraka later negotiated the commercial area of the property. In September 2018, Riu reached an agreement with Corpfin Capital Real Estate over the 15,000 m^{2} (160,000 sq ft) retail area, spread over three floors, in a transaction reported at €160 million.

The hotel opened in August 2019 with 585 rooms, restaurants, meeting spaces and an upper-floor terrace. Its formal inauguration took place on 11 September 2019 and was attended by Community of Madrid president Isabel Díaz Ayuso.

=== Conservation campaign ===
In January 2014, amid the sale process, the lowering of the building's protection level and public concern over possible demolition, Madrid resident José María Villalobos Matilla created a Change.org petition asking for the building to be conserved and its previous protection level restored. The petition gathered more than 72,000 signatures and was delivered to Madrid City Council in November 2015.

The campaign led to the creation of Plataforma Salvemos el Edificio España, a coalition that included local heritage and neighbourhood organisations. In 2017, after an agreement among Baraka, Madrid City Council and Ecologists in Action, campaigners said that the goal of saving the building had been achieved.

== Description ==
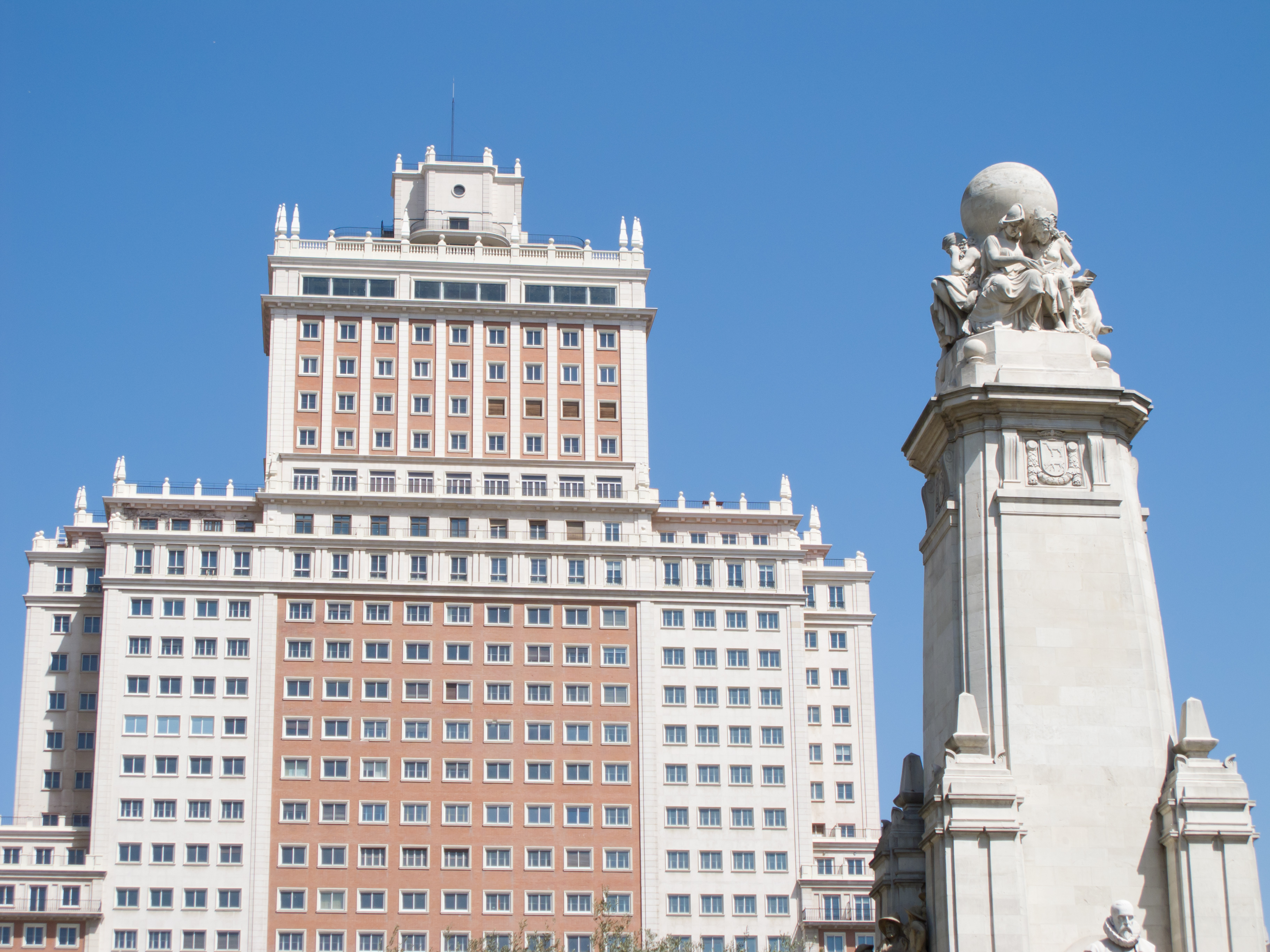
The Edificio España behind the Monument to Miguel de Cervantes in Plaza de España

=== Exterior ===
The building is prominent in Plaza de España because of its large symmetrical façade, about 150 m (490 ft) wide. It has 77,000 m^{2} (830,000 sq ft) of floor area and 32 elevators serving its 26 floors. Its rear elevation is marked by five deep open courtyards, which provide natural light and direct ventilation to interior spaces.

The façade is clad in artificial stone and forms a stepped profile. Architectural guides have described the building as one of the representative works of the Madrid of the autarkic period, because of its monumental language and its place within the post-war urban planning associated with the Plan Bidagor.

=== Interior ===
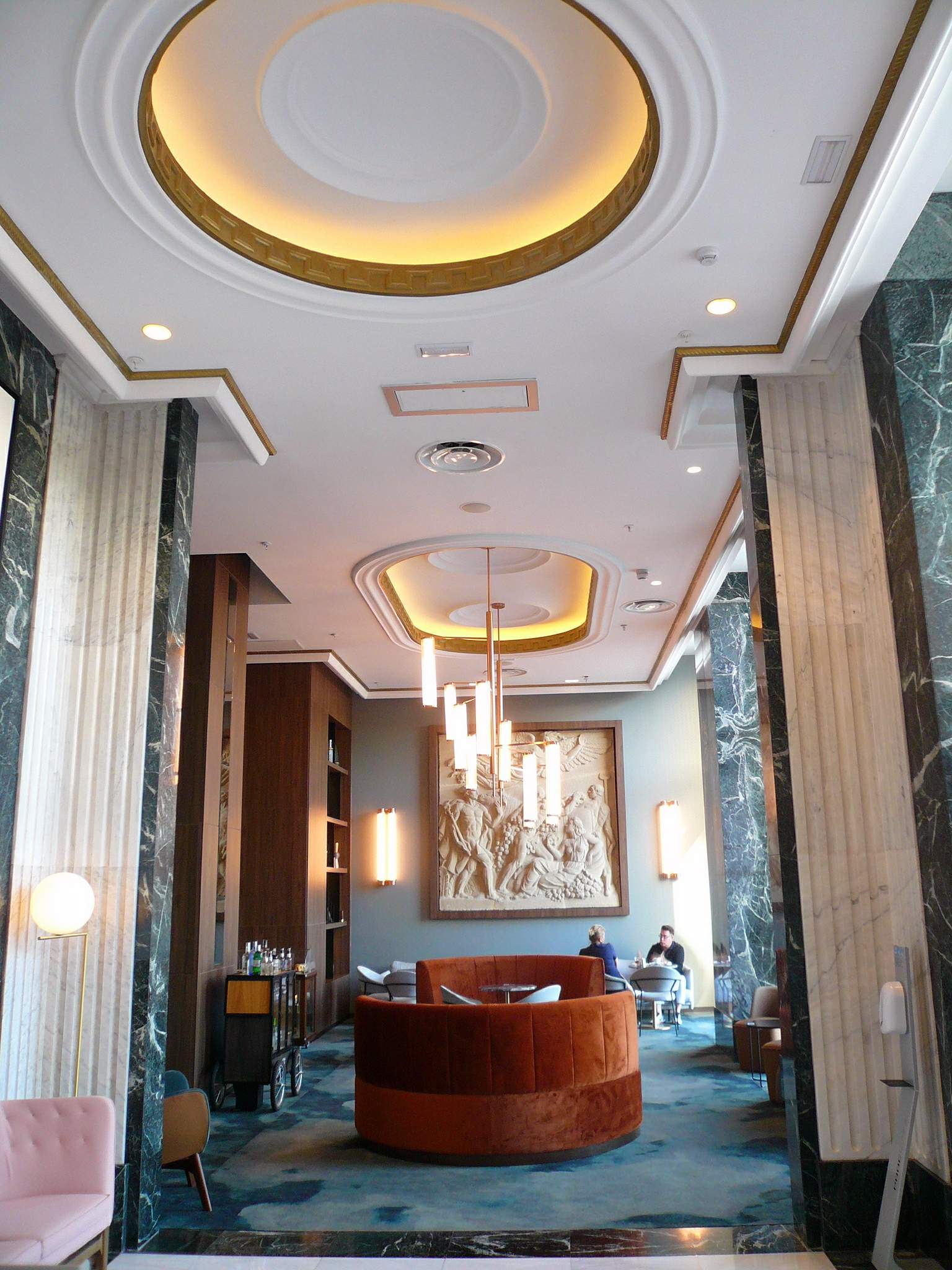
Lobby of the Hotel Riu Plaza España

When the original Hotel Plaza opened in 1953, it was conceived as a luxury hotel and as a showcase for foreign visitors to Madrid. Its interior decoration followed Art Deco conventions associated with early United States skyscrapers. The ground floor included commercial and art galleries.

During the 2017–2019 hotel conversion, protected original elements, including marble finishes, bas-reliefs and decorative features, were retained where required, while the building was reconfigured to accommodate contemporary hotel use. RIU's own account of the project emphasised heritage conservation and the creation of a public-facing rooftop terrace as key parts of the refurbishment.

== Sustainability and recognition ==
In January 2019, during FITUR, the Hotel Riu Plaza España received a Re Think Hotel award in the "projects to be executed" category for a planned aerothermal domestic-hot-water system developed with Arditecnica and Clima Insular. The system was selected because heritage and height constraints made solar-panel installation impracticable. According to contemporary reports, it was designed to raise the primary circuit to 90 °C (194 °F) without conventional support energy, reducing primary energy use and carbon dioxide emissions.

Spanish academic literature has discussed RIU alongside other hotel chains in relation to corporate environmental responsibility and sustainable tourism practices. In December 2025, RIU announced that all of its operational hotels had obtained ECOSTARS certification, covering 98 hotels in 21 countries; the chain described the certification as part of its Proudly Committed sustainability strategy for 2023–2026.

== In popular culture ==
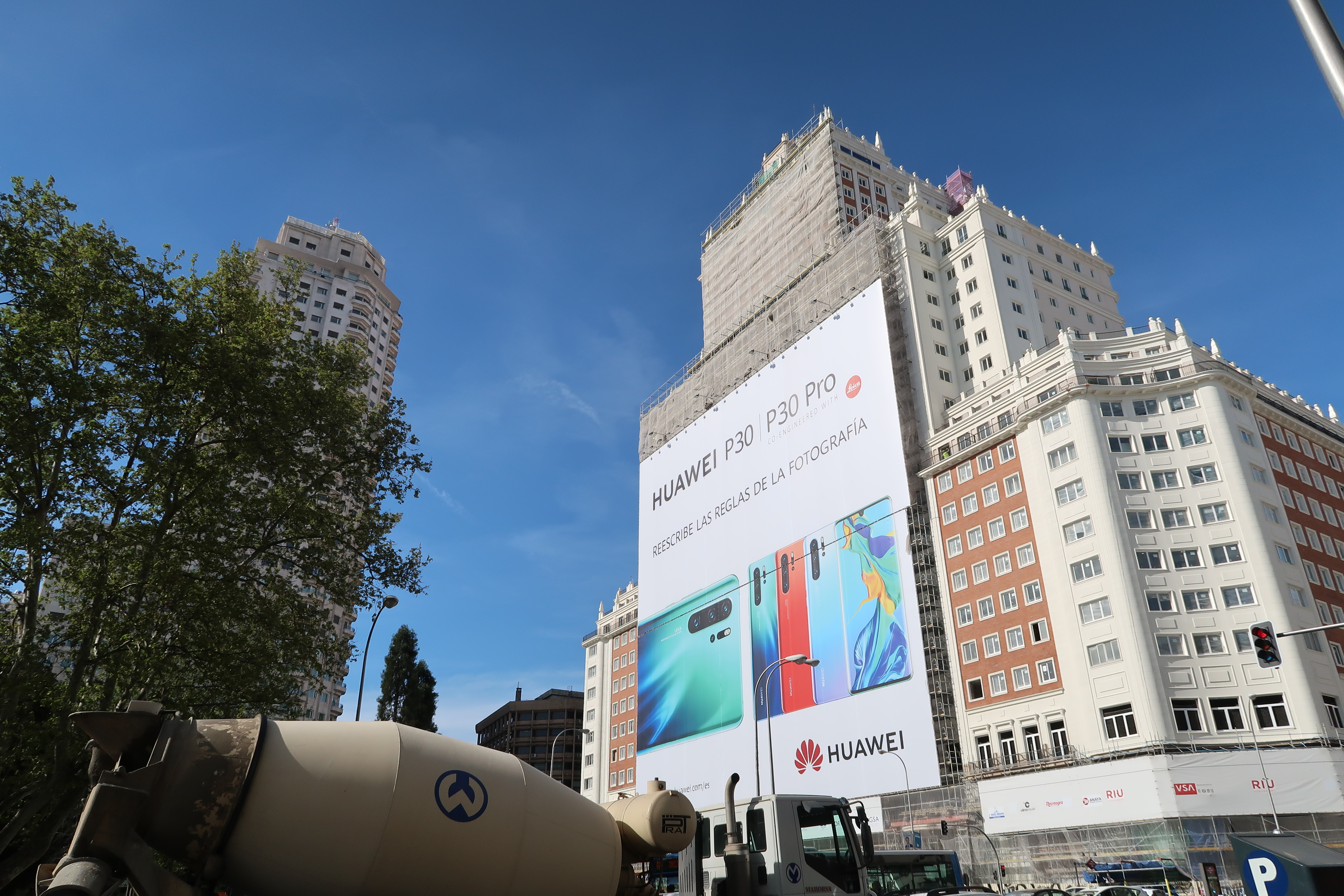
The building during refurbishment, with a large advertising canvas on the façade

The building is depicted in the 1984 film The Hit. Part of the film was shot in an apartment in the nearby Torre de Madrid, from which the Edificio España is visible.

In 2007, documentary filmmaker Víctor Moreno began filming the interior demolition and refurbishment of the building. His documentary Edificio España (English title: The Building) focuses on more than 200 workers from different countries who took part in the works. The film was shot with the permission of the building's then owner, Banco Santander, but the bank later objected to public screenings; the dispute delayed its release in Spain. Despite the dispute, the documentary was shown at festivals including the San Sebastián International Film Festival, the Buenos Aires International Festival of Independent Cinema and Doclisboa, and it was eventually released in Spanish cinemas in 2014. It was nominated for the Goya Award for best documentary.

On 10 February 2018, during the refurbishment works, a large advertising canvas was installed on the façade and reported as the largest of its kind in the world. It covered 470 windows, measured 5,265 m^{2} (56,670 sq ft), weighed two tonnes and required about 600 anchors. On 1 March 2018, strong winds caused safety concerns over the canvas, prompting temporary traffic and pedestrian restrictions while it was secured.

After its reopening as a hotel, the building appeared in several audiovisual productions. In 2020, C. Tangana filmed part of the music video for Tú Me Dejaste De Querer in one of the suites of the Hotel Riu Plaza España. The building also appears in several episodes of the fourth season of the Netflix series Elite.

== See also ==
- List of tallest buildings in Madrid
- Telefónica Building
- Torre de Madrid
- Gran Vía, Madrid
- Palace of Culture and Science

Preceded by Telefónica Building	Tallest building in Madrid; 1953–1957	Succeeded by Torre de Madrid
