= Advanced Continuous Simulation Language =

Computer language

The Advanced Continuous Simulation Language, or ACSL (pronounced "axle"), is a computer language designed for modeling and evaluating the performance of continuous systems described by time-dependent, nonlinear differential equations. Like SIMCOS and TUTSIM, ACSL is a dialect of the Continuous System Simulation Language (CSSL), originally designed by the Simulation Councils Inc (SCI) in 1967 in an attempt to unify the continuous simulations field.

== Language highlights ==
ACSL is an equation-oriented language consisting of a set of arithmetic operators, standard functions, a set of special ACSL statements, and a MACRO capability which allows extension of the special ACSL statements.

ACSL is intended to provide a simple method of representing mathematical models on a digital computer. Working from an equation description of the problem or a block diagram, the user writes ACSL statements to describe the system under investigation.

An important feature of ACSL is its sorting of the continuous model equations, in contrast to general purpose programming languages such as Fortran where program execution depends critically on statement order.

== Typical applications ==
Applications of ACSL in new areas are being developed constantly. Typical areas in which ACSL is currently applied include control system design, aerospace simulation, chemical process dynamics, power plant dynamics, plant and animal growth, toxicology models, vehicle handling, microprocessor controllers, and robotics.
