= Plaza de toros de las Arenas =

Converted bullring in Barcelona, Spain

Coordinates: 41.3650°N 2.1492°E

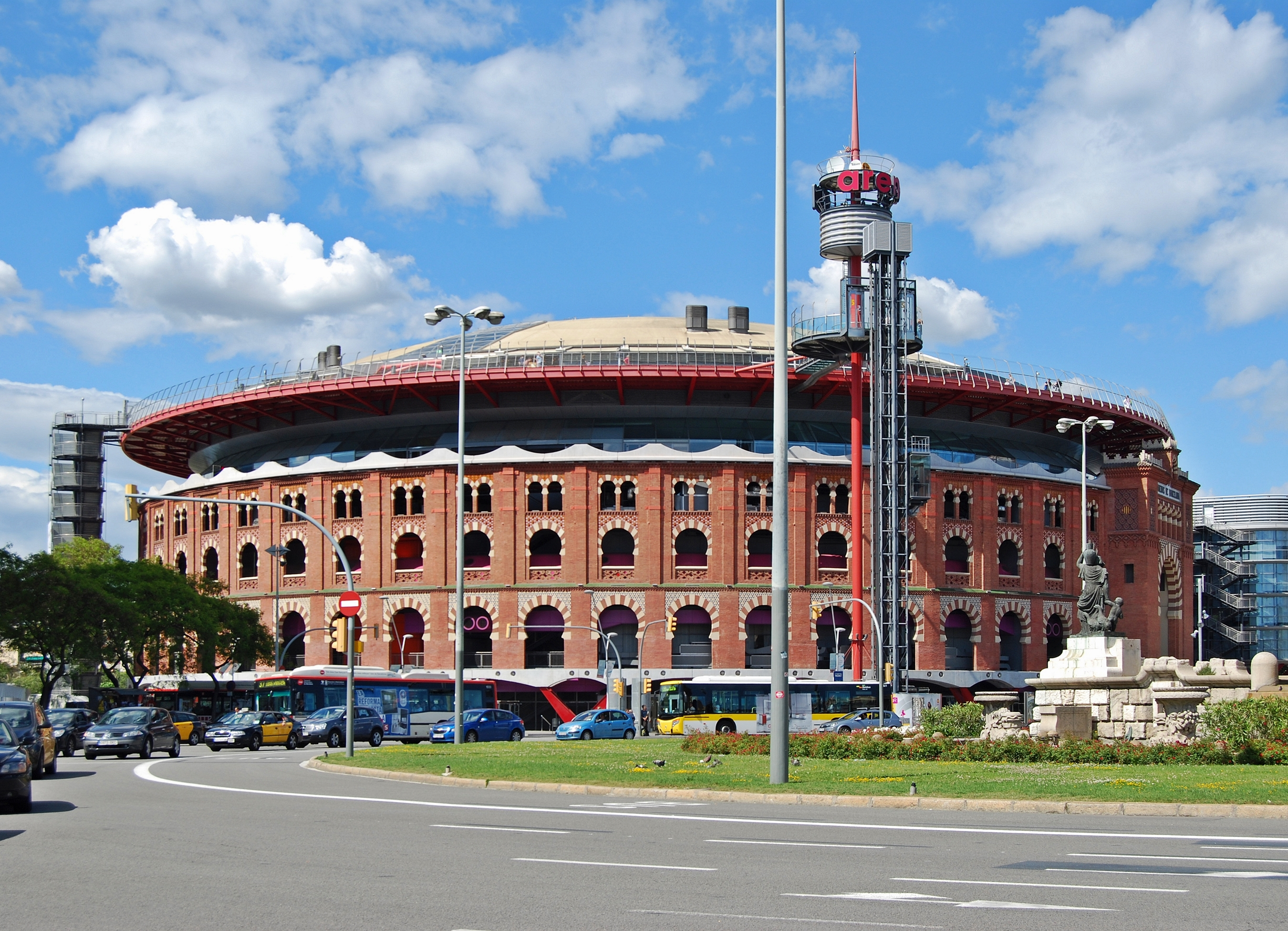
Plaza de toros de las Arenas (2013)

Plaza de toros de las Arenas is a converted former bullring in Barcelona, Catalonia, Spain. Over the years it was used music venue, hosting Carlos Santana and Paco de Lucia in 1977. It opened on June 29, 1900, and its last bullfight was held on June 19, 1977. The building was reopened in 2011 as a shopping and entertainment complex named Arenas de Barcelona.

== History ==
The plaza de Las Arenas opened in 1900. It was mainly used for boxing or free fights. In 1927, when it became the property of rich entrepreneur Pedro Balañá, the Arenas were remodeled into a bullfight arena. During the Civil War, the building was occupied by anti-fascist militias. Bullfights went on during the Franco era. In the 1960s, a North-American and European tourism grew around bullfights in Spain. The last fight took place in 1977.

Bob Marley and The Wailers performed on 30 June 1980 in support of their Uprising Tour (European Leg).

In 1989, the first anti-bullfight campaign was led in Catalonia. In 2004, support grew in Barcelona against bullfighting and by 2010, bullfights were voted illegal; however, this law was overturned in 2016.

== 2011 remodeling ==
The remodeling work started in November 2009. The developer, Metrovacesa, invested 70 million euros in the project. The architects were Alonso y Balaguer and Richard Rogers. The construction work was handled by Dragados. A public walkway was installed on the last floor all around the building, allowing a 360 degrees view of the city (the mirador).

The Arenas opened as a new mall in March 2011.

== Description ==
The commercial area is 31,918 m2 and counts 100 stores on 6 floors. In 2015, the mall recorded 10,500,000 visitors.

The dome of the building is 27 metres high.
