= Jacqueline Hewitt =

American astrophysicist

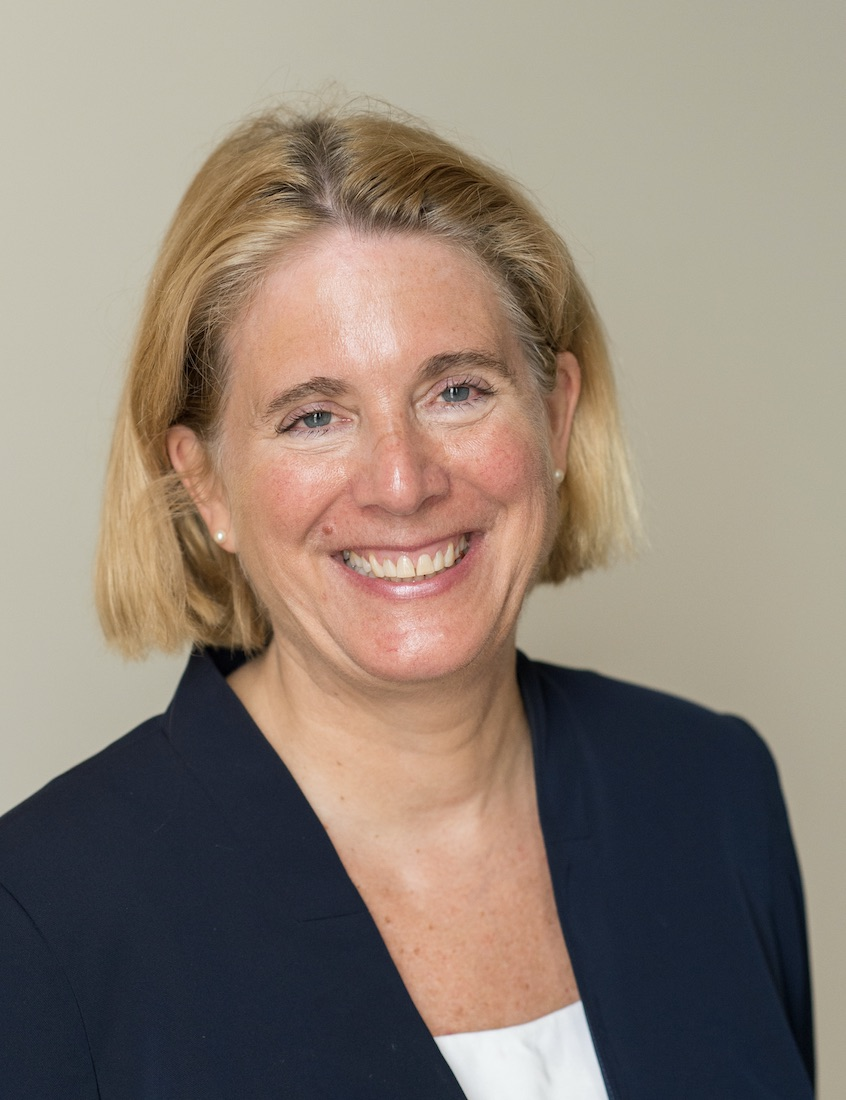
- Born: September 4, 1958 (age 67) Washington, D.C.
- Education: Bryn Mawr College (BA); Massachusetts Institute of Technology (PhD)
- Awards: Annie Jump Cannon Award in Astronomy
- Scientific career
- Fields: Astrophysics
- Thesis: A search for gravitational lensing (1986)
- Doctoral students: Christopher Williams

Jacqueline Nina Hewitt (born September 4, 1958) is an American astrophysicist. She was the first person to discover an Einstein ring. She is a Fellow of the American Astronomical Society.

== Early life and education ==
Hewitt was born in Washington, D.C., on September 4, 1958, to parents Warren E. Hewitt, a retired international lawyer from the State Department, and Gertrud (Graedel) Hewitt. She attended Bryn Mawr College where she graduated magna cum laude with a degree in economics in 1980. Hewitt took an astronomy class at Haverford College her sophomore year, which sparked her interest in science. She attended the Massachusetts Institute of Technology for graduate school. During her graduate studies, she began studying gravitational lensing using the Very Large Array radio telescope. Hewitt obtained a Ph.D. in physics in 1986. Some sources erroneously state that she received her Ph.D. in 1988.

== Career ==
Hewitt was appointed with a postdoctoral fellowship at MIT as part of the Very-long-baseline interferometry unit from 1986 to 1988. While analyzing the data from her graduate studies, she found a ring on her computer screen. This ring, part of the gravitational lens system MG1131+0456, ended up being the very first Einstein ring discovered. Since Hewitt's groundbreaking discovery, many other Einstein rings have been discovered, and were found to be far more common than astronomers thought. Einstein rings are important because they can help answer questions about the size and the fate of our universe. Hewitt worked as a researcher at Princeton University's Department of Astrophysical Sciences in 1988. After one year of researching at Princeton, she returned to MIT as an assistant physics professor, working as a full-time professor since 1989. Hewitt is also the principal investigator for the Radio Astronomy Group of the Research Laboratory of Electronics at MIT. In 2002, Hewitt was appointed Director of the MIT Kavli Institute for Astrophysics and Space Research until 2019.

== Honors ==
In 1990, Hewitt won the David and Lucile Packard Foundation fellowship. In 1993, Hewitt was awarded the Henry G. Booker Prize by the International Union of Radio Science. For her work on gravitational lenses, her colleagues at MIT nominated her for the 1995–1996 Harold E. Edgerton Award. In 1995, Hewitt was the recipient of the Maria Goeppert-Mayer Award and in 1989 the Annie J. Cannon Award in Astronomy for her work in radio astronomy.

In 2005 she was named a Fellow of the American Physics Society. She was elected a Legacy Fellow of the American Astronomical Society in 2020.

== Personal life ==
Hewitt has two children: Keith Hewitt Redwine, born in 1988, and Jonathan Hewitt Redwine, born in 1993.
