= Paul L. Schechter =

American astronomer

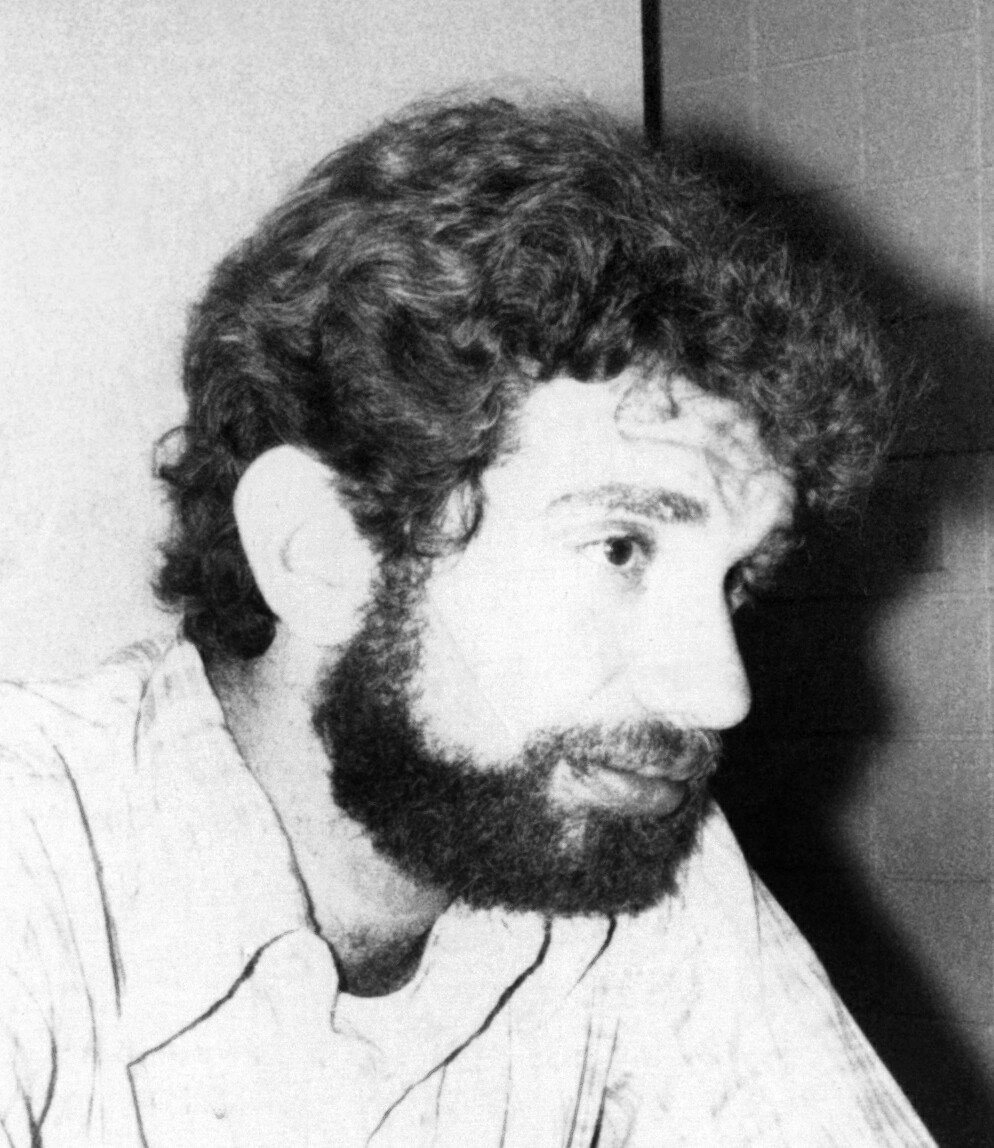
Paul L. Schechter (1977)

Paul L. Schechter (born May 30, 1948) is an American astronomer and observational cosmologist. He is the William A. M. Burden Professor of Astrophysics, Emeritus, at MIT.

Schechter received his bachelor's degree from Cornell in 1968, and his Ph.D. degree from Caltech in 1975. He held postdoctoral positions at the Institute for Advanced Study and the University of Arizona, then went to Harvard as an assistant professor. He moved to his present position at MIT in 1988. Schechter was elected to the U.S. National Academy of Sciences in 2003.

Schechter is known for his work establishing what is now known as the Schechter luminosity function for galaxies, and for work with William Press on what is now termed the Press–Schechter formalism. He also developed accurate methods for measuring velocity dispersions of galaxies, analyzed the Virgocentric infall, and performed precise analyses of gravitational lenses.

Notable past students include Robert A. Simcoe.
