= MIT Kavli Institute =

Astrophysics research institute at MIT

Coordinates: 42.360826°N 71.093167°W

- Established: 1963
- Field of research: Astrophysics
- Location: 70 Vassar Street, Cambridge, Massachusetts, U.S.
- Operating agency: Massachusetts Institute of Technology
- Website: www.space.mit.edu

The MIT Kavli Institute for Astrophysics and Space Research (MKI) is a research institute at the Massachusetts Institute of Technology. The center has designed experiments and spacecraft instruments for major NASA missions since the 1970s and supports 180 scientists and 37 faculty members. Since 2018, the institute has been directed by Robert A. Simcoe.

== History ==
In May 1963, the MIT Center for Space Research (CSR) was founded by George W. Clark, a professor of physics who played a major role in the discovery of celestial Gamma ray sources, with the support of a NASA research grant. He was joined by Bruno Rossi, who led the RaLa Experiment in the Manhattan Project, before to joining MIT in 1946.

Beginning in the early 1970s, the CSR at MIT designed spacecraft instruments for NASA missions to study the Sun, Earth's magnetosphere, astronomical X-rays, and interplanetary plasma, including on the Voyager program.

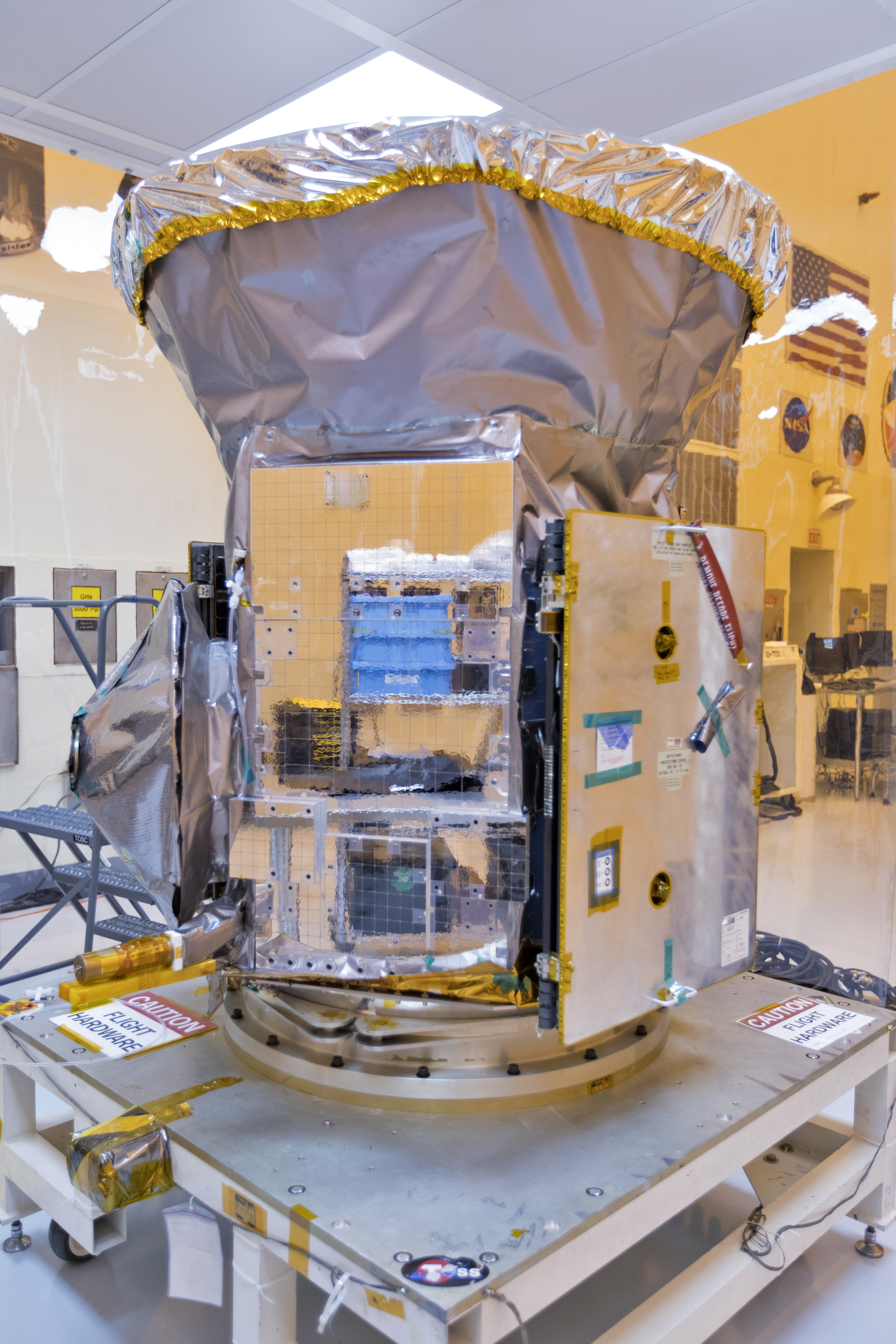
Transiting Exoplanet Survey Satellite

In 2004, the Kavli Foundation made a large donation to produce an institute merging the CSR with MIT's Division for Astrophysics. The resulting research center centralizes astronomy and space research across MIT departments spanning physics, atmospheric and planetary science, and aerospace.

== Research ==
The institute has built instruments as a NASA partner for missions including the Transiting Exoplanet Survey Satellite (TESS), Chandra X-ray Observatory, and the Neutron Star Interior Composition Explorer (NICER) experiment on the International Space Station (ISS).

The institute hosts MIT's research on gravitational waves, including through the LIGO experiment for which MIT Prof. Rainer Weiss received the 2017 Nobel Prize in Physics.

MKI supports international observatories and provided three instruments, including the Large Lenslet Array Magellan Spectrograph (LLAMAS), for the Magellan Telescopes in Chile. It also supports development of the Hydrogen Epoch of Reionization Array (HERA) in South Africa with funding from the Gordon and Betty Moore Foundation and the National Science Foundation (NSF).

As of 2025, research at the institute focuses on dark matter detection, exoplanet surveys, black holes and gravitational waves, the evolution and reionization of the early universe, and theoretical astrophysics.

== Directors ==
No.	Director	Start	End	Notes
1	John V. Harrington	1963	1973	Inaugural director
2	John F. McCarthy Jr.	1973	1978	
3	Gordon Pettengill	1984	1989	
4	Claude R. Canizares	1990	2002	Later served as MIT Associate Provost and VP of Research
5	Jacqueline Hewitt	2002	2019	Led CSR through establishment of MIT Kavli Institute in 2004
6	Robert A. Simcoe	2019	present	

== List of missions ==
Start	End	Instrument(s)/Experiment(s)	Mission	Status
1961	1961	Faraday cup plasma experiment	Explorer 10	Complete
1975	1975	X-ray detectors for source localization	SAS-3	Complete
1977	—	Plasma Science Experiment (VPLS)	Voyager 1	Active
1977	—	Plasma Science Experiment (VPLS)	Voyager 2	Active
1978	1978	Focal Plane Crystal Spectrometer	Einstein Observatory (HEAO-2)	Complete
1993	2001	Solid State Imaging Spectrometer (SIS)	Advanced Satellite for Cosmology and Astrophysics (Astro-D)	Complete
1995	2018	All Sky Monitor (ASM); data system	RXTE	Complete
1999	—	ACIS; HETG instruments	Chandra X-ray Observatory	Active
2000	2006	Wide-field X-ray & gamma-ray detectors	HETE-2	Complete
2017	—	Neutron Star Interior Composition Explorer	NICER	Active
2018	—	4 wide-field CCD cameras	TESS	Active
