= Simcoe (ship) =

Simcoe can refer to the following ships:

- Governor Simcoe (1793 ship), an Upper Canada merchant schooner, that later served as the Canadian colonial militia navy's Sir Sydney Smith, and then as the British Royal Navy brig HMS Magnet
- CGS Simcoe (1909), a Canadian government lighthouse tender ship
- CCGS Simcoe (1962), a Canadian Coast Guard buoy tender ship

== See also ==
- Simcoe (disambiguation)
