= Governor Simcoe =

Governor Simcoe may refer to:

- John Graves Simcoe (1752–1806), Governor of Upper Canada
- Governor Simcoe Secondary School, a high school in St. Catharines, Ontario
- Governor Simcoe (1793 ship), a Canadian schooner launched in 1793 and scuttled in 1814

== See also ==
- Simcoe (disambiguation)
- Governor (disambiguation)
