= Telefónica Building =

Coordinates: 40.419992°N 3.701888°W

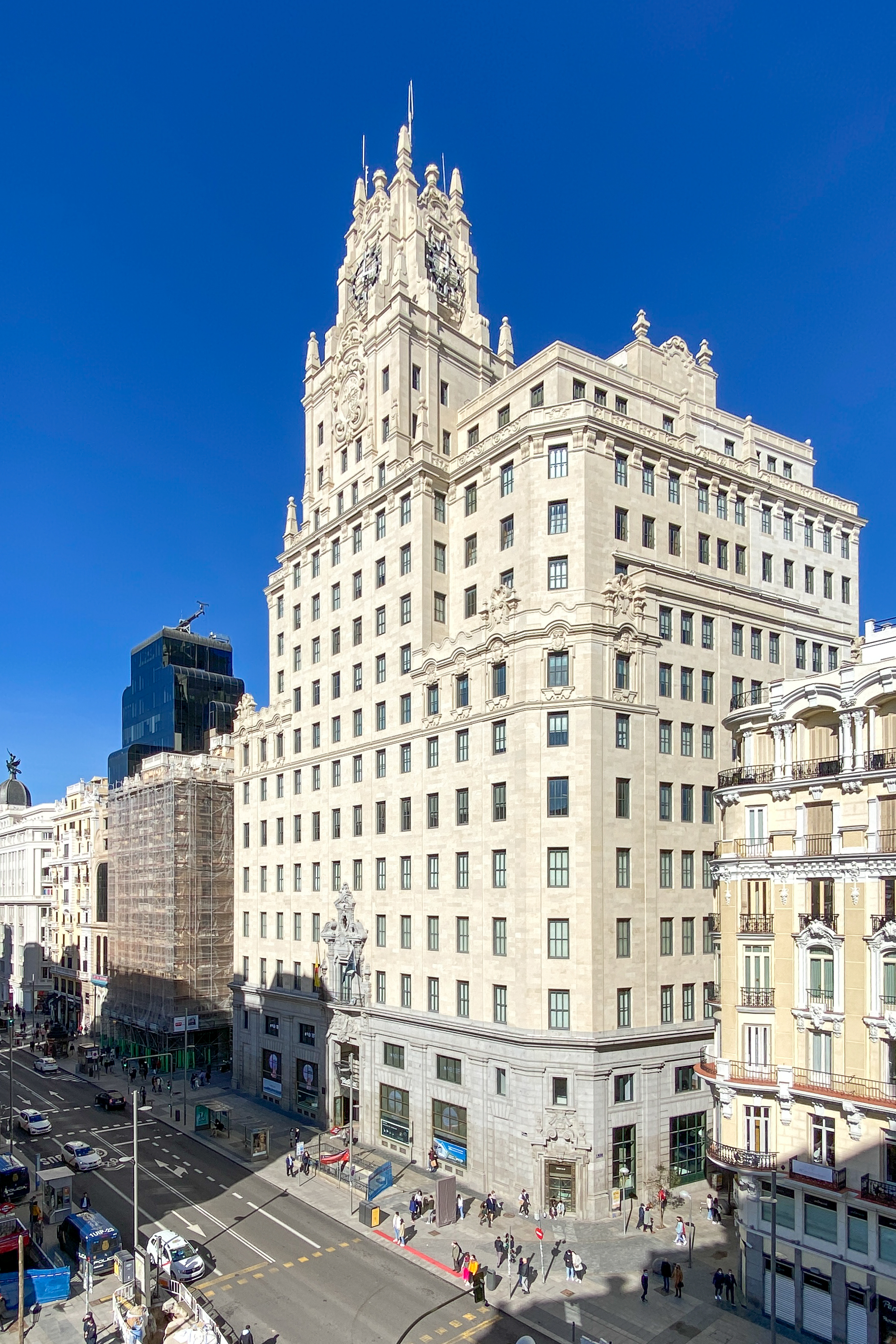
- Street view of the Telefónica Building from Red de San Luis Square

General information
- Status: Completed
- Type: Commercial offices
- Location: Gran Via 28, Madrid, Spain
- Construction started: 1926
- Completed: March 1929
- Cost: ~32 million pesetas

Height
- Roof: 89 metres (292 ft)

Technical details
- Floor count: 14

Design and construction
- Architect: Ignacio de Cárdenas

The Telefónica Building, in Spanish Edificio Telefónica, is a skyscraper in Madrid, Spain, which serves as the registered office of the namesake telecommunications company. It is located in Gran Via 28. At the time of construction it was the tallest European skyscraper with 89 m of roof height, until in 1940, when the Terrazza Martini Tower opened in Genoa.

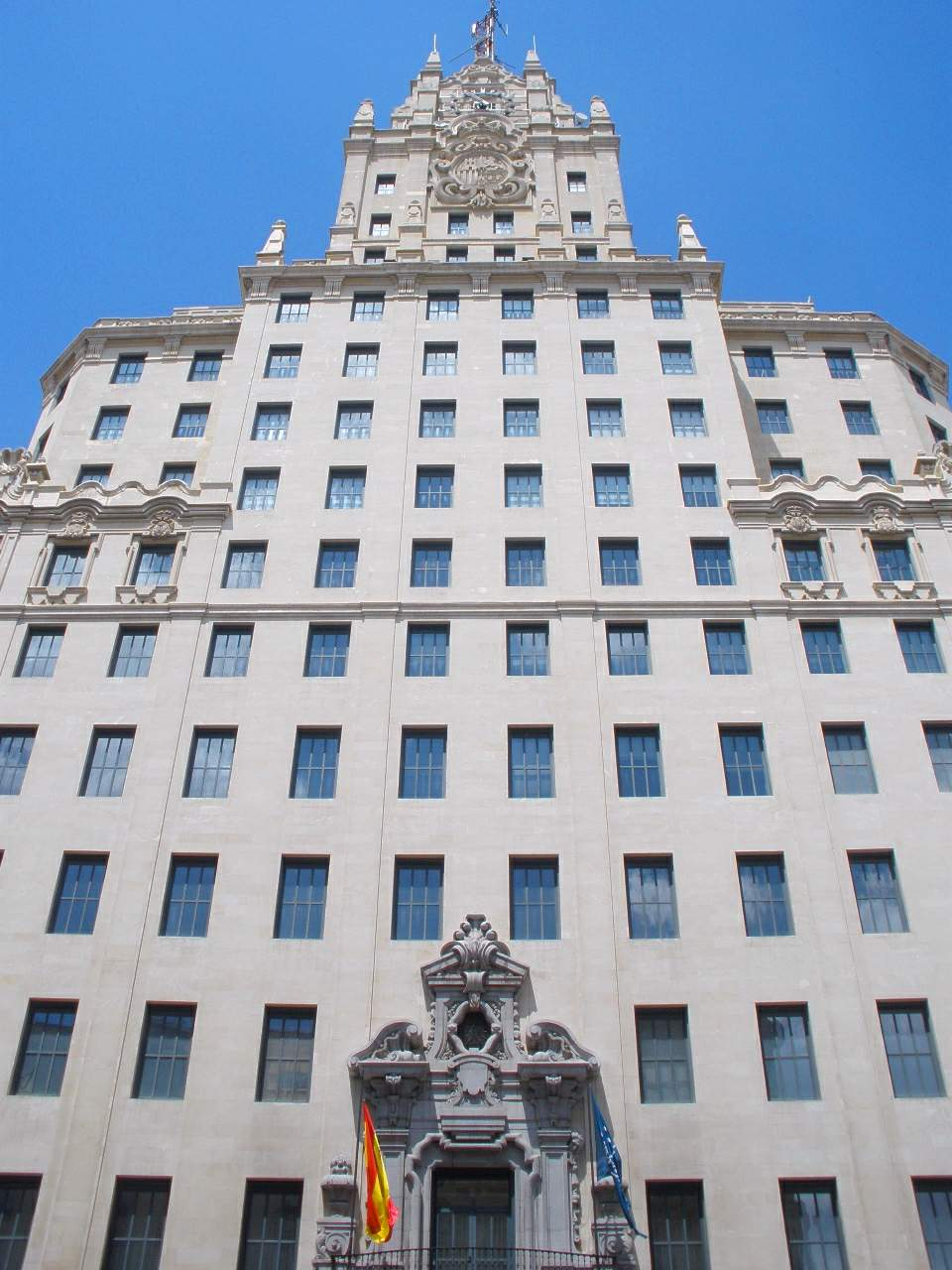
Front view

== History ==
The Telefónica Building was designed by Ignacio de Cárdenas, who conceived it after a previous study of Louis S. Weeks in New York City. Even though the building is of American inspiration, Cárdenas touch can be felt in its churrigueresque exterior ornamentation, a nod to Madrid Baroque architecture.

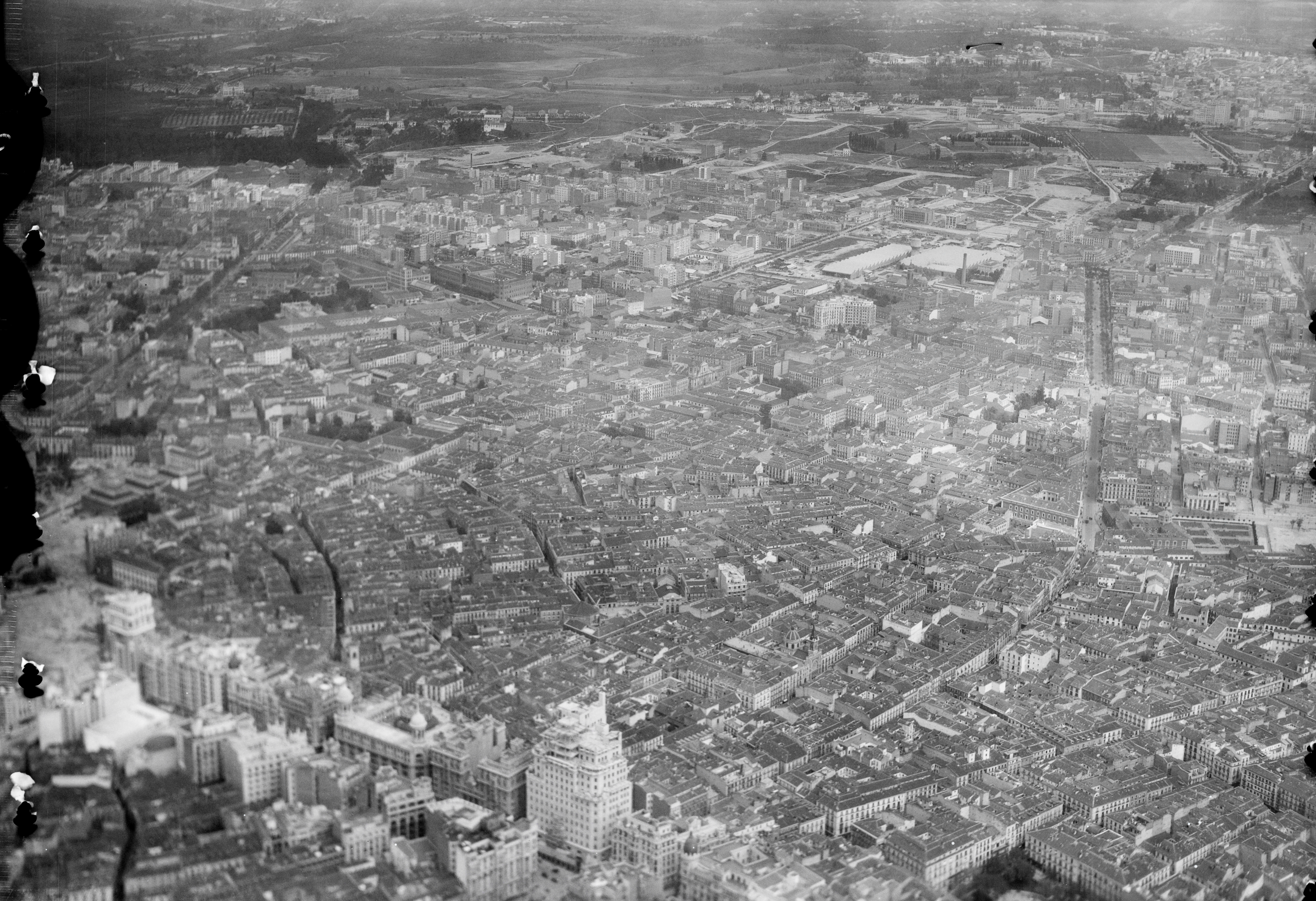
Aerial view of Madrid in 1928. The Telefónica Building is on the bottom center.

Its construction started in 1926 and it was fully completed in March 1929, despite opening its doors officially on 1 January 1930. The workforce was composed of more than 1000 workers and the final cost added up to 32 million pesetas. It became one of the first skyscrapers in Europe. It also held the Madrid height record by surpassing the Palacio de la Prensa, which it maintained until it was overtaken in 1953 by the Edificio España.

During the Spanish Civil War it was used as an observatory by the Republican forces to watch the whereabouts of Francoist troops. This reason, and the fact of being the Office of Foreign Press, made it a target of bombings during the war. Ernest Hemingway, John Dos Passos and Antoine de Saint-Exupéry sent their reports from inside the premises, controlled by the Republican foreign press censhorship office, whose head was Arturo Barea.

== Skyline ==
The Telefónica Building rises to 89 metres. It comprises 14 high-ceiling floors plus a basement, a semibasement and a central tower, which is currently topped by mobile communication antennas. It can be seen from many places in Madrid city centre.

From 1967 to 2013, its red lit clock has become a landmark at dusk and night. From 1 July 2013, the colour of the clock is blue to better accommodate the Telefónica corporate brand. It prevails as the tallest building in Gran Vía, with the exception of Edificio España and the Torre de Madrid at the end of Gran Vía.

== Nowadays ==
It currently hosts the Telefónica Foundation , a Telecommunications Museum and an auditorium. The Foundation hosts numerous art events and talks by renowned creators such as Vanessa Murrell, Johanna Jaskowska, Guillermo Arriaga, Afua Hirsch, Suzy Amis Cameron, Saskia Sassen and Richard Sennett.
