= SAMCO (disambiguation) =

SAMCO Inc. is a Japanese electronics manufacturing company.
SAMCO or Samco may also refer to:

- Samco Scientific, a manufacturer of laboratory equipment
- Samco Global Arms, Inc., owners of Charles Daly firearms
- SAM Computers Ltd., a company that formerly marketed the SAM Coupé home computer
- Sai Gon Mechanical Engineering Corporation, a Vietnamese automobile manufacturer

== See also ==
- Simco (disambiguation)
