= Simcoe (surname) =

Simcoe is a surname, and may refer to:

- Anthony Simcoe (born 1969), Australian actor
- Elizabeth Simcoe (1762–1850), British artist and diarist, wife of John Graves Simcoe
- John Graves Simcoe (1752–1806), British army officer, the first lieutenant governor of Upper Canada
- Michael Simcoe (born c.1960), Australian automobile designer
- Robert A. Simcoe (born 1975), American astrophysicist at MIT
- William Simcoe, American politician from Maryland of the 1840s
