= Léon de Bruxelles =

Restaurant chain

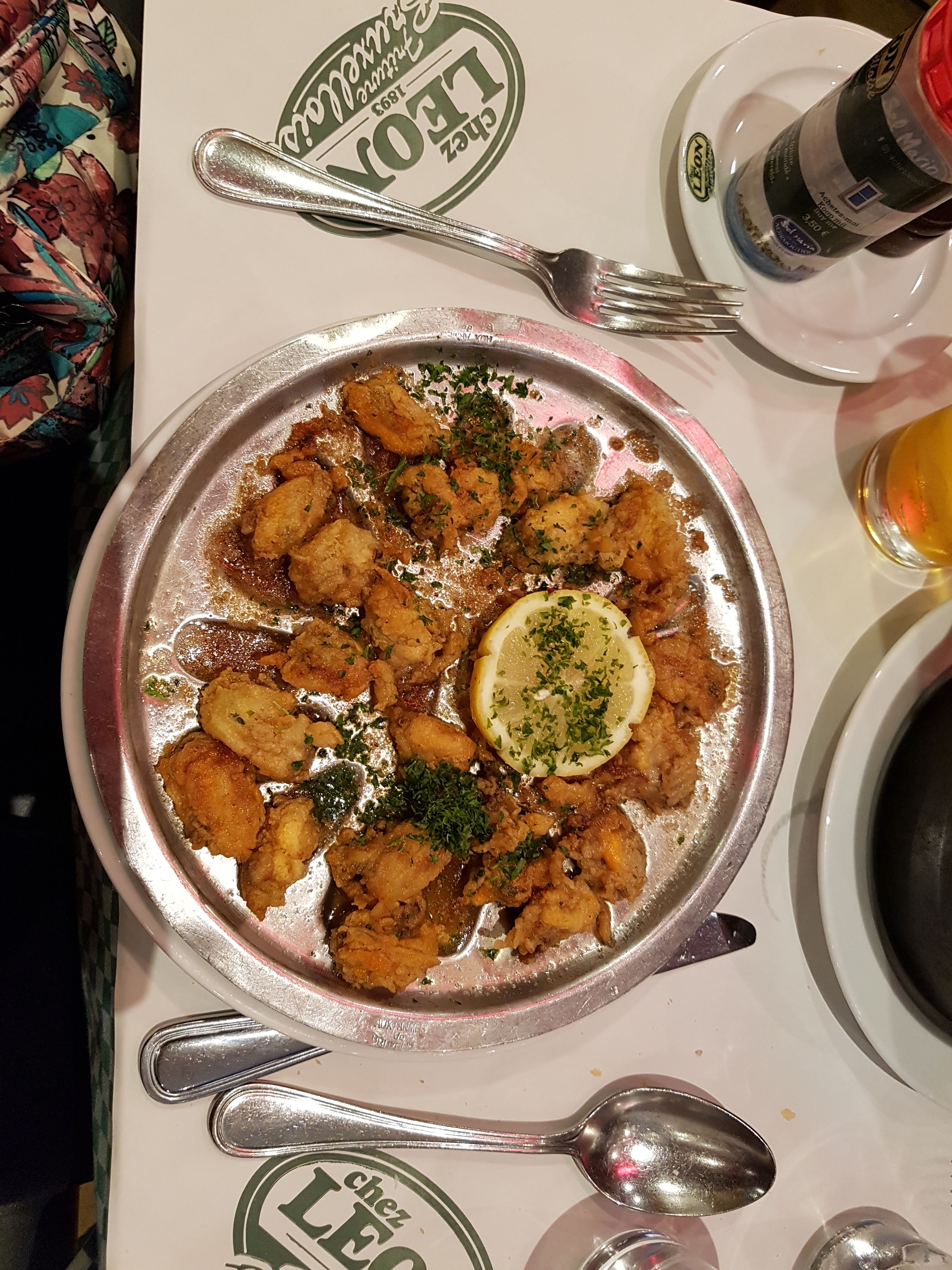
- A mussels dish served at Chez Léon restaurant
- Industry: Casual dining
- Genre: Belgian cuisine
- Founded: 1989, Paris, France
- Founder: Rudolphe Vanlancker
- Products: Moules frites
- Website: leon-de-bruxelles.fr

Léon de Bruxelles is a chain of restaurants known for primarily serving moules-frites. Léon de Bruxelles is a French independent franchise originally set up by a Belgian restaurateur family who has run the over 100 year old Brussels restaurant Chez Léon.

Léon de Bruxelles restaurants are known for serving a Belgian cuisine inspired menu.

== History ==
=== Chez Léon ===
In 1867, Léon Vanlancker set up business within a stone's throw distance of Brussels's landmark square, the Grand-Place, to run a five-table restaurant called A la Ville d'Anvers. In 1893, he moved a few meters from there to 18 rue des Bouchers and opened the larger fr:Chez Léon.

Growth accelerated from 1958 onward when Belgium's reputation as the capital of mussels and French fries was cemented. Since then, the Vanlancker owned restaurant continued to expand. Today, Chez Léon extends to nine buildings and more than one thousand meals are served every day.

=== Léon de Bruxelles ===
In 1989, the inheritor of the family business, Rudy Vanlancker opened the first Léon restaurant at Place de la République in Paris. Other Léon de Bruxelles restaurants opened in other districts of the city, including the flagship restaurant on the Champs-Élysées in 1991. By 1995, Léon de Bruxelles opened its first restaurant outside Paris, with the restaurant of Montlhéry in North France. More openings followed and today there are 67 Léon de Bruxelles restaurants across France.

Léon de Bruxelles opened its first restaurant in the UK in January 2012. Located at 24 Cambridge Circus in Covent Garden, London. However, this restaurant is now closed.
