= Robert A. Simcoe =

American physicist at MIT

- Born: May 2, 1975 (age 51); Westborough, Massachusetts, U.S.
- Spouse: Patricia Udomprasert

Academic background
- Education: Princeton University (AB); California Institute of Technology (PhD)
- Thesis: Observations of intergalactic heavy element enrichment in the early universe (2003)

Academic work
- Institutions: Massachusetts Institute of Technology; MIT Kavli Institute
- Main interests: Early universe; star formation; interstellar medium
- Website: https://physics.mit.edu/faculty/robert-simcoe/

Robert Andrew Simcoe (born May 2, 1975) is an American astrophysicist. He is Francis L. Friedman professor of physics at the Massachusetts Institute of Technology (MIT) and director of the MIT Kavli Institute since 2019.

== Early life and education ==
He was born in Westborough, Massachusetts in 1975. His father, Robert J. Simcoe, is an astronomer. He developed an interest in astronomy as a child and began to build telescopes in his first year of middle school after visiting the Stellafane Observatory. Simcoe attended Princeton University, where he studied astrophysics and completed a senior thesis on binary quasars and gravitational lensing under Edwin L. Turner, graduating in 1997. Simcoe completed his doctorate at Caltech, where he studied heavy metal enrichment in the early universe under Wallace L. W. Sargent in 2003.

== Career ==
After graduating, Simcoe joined MIT as a Pappalardo postdoctoral researcher under Paul L. Schechter until 2006, when he was appointed a professor of physics. He was awarded tenure in 2011 and became Francis L. Friedman professor in 2014. Since 2019, he is director of the MIT Kavli Institute for Astrophysics and Space Research.

His research focuses on star formation, quasars, and galaxy formation and evolution in the early universe, and he has published widely in scientific journals. Simcoe built the folded-port infrared Echelette (FIRE) spectrometer for the Magellan Telescopes in Chile to identify and research supermassive black holes. His instrument development programs have received $10 million in funding from the National Science Foundation (NSF), including the Large Lenslet Array Magellan Spectrograph (LLAMAS) at the MIT Kavli Institute.

Notable past students include Daniella Bardalez Gagliuffi.

== Personal life ==
Simcoe is married to Patricia Udomprasert, a project director at the Harvard–Smithsonian Center for Astrophysics. The couple attended Princeton and Caltech together and have two children.

== Awards ==
- Lewis A. Kinglsey Fellowship (2001)
- Sloan Research Fellowship (2009)
- Harvard Radcliffe Institute Fellow (2016)
- Kingsley Distinguished Visiting professor at Caltech (2017)
- Astronomical Society of the Pacific Muhlmann Award (2024)
