= TUTSIM =

TUTSIM was the first commercial simulation software ever to run on an IBM-PC. The package was used for the modeling and simulation of multi-domain systems using differential equations and bond graphs.

== History ==
TUTSIM (Twente University of Technology SIMulator) was developed at the Control Laboratory of the University of Twente in the early-1970s. The program was initially created for the PDP-11 and LSI-11 series of DEC. At the end of the 1970s it was ported to run on microprocessors like the MOS Technology 6502 of the Apple II and the Intel 8086 of the IBM Personal Computer.

The company Meerman Automation took over the development of the package in the early-1980s. The rise of the IBM PC gave TUTSIM its world fame, making scientific simulation software available for researchers all over the world. Failing to meet the demands of a graphical user interface with the rise of Microsoft Windows in the late-1980s the popularity of TUTSIM slowly faded away. Multiple requests from bond graph researchers caused the University of Twente to begin development of a successor to TUTSIM. This resulted in the software 20-sim, released by Controllab, which contained many of the features that made TUTSIM popular.

== Use ==
TUTSIM was an interactive simulation language for continuous dynamical systems. Input had to be given in block diagram form or in bond graph form. The lack of a graphical UI required inputs in textual form by entering commands and arguments. For simulation, fixed step integration methods were provided. Simulation results were displayed in a graphical form or numerically in tables.

== See also ==
- Bond graph
- University of Twente
- Controllab
- 20-sim
