= Gecina =

French real estate investment trust

- Type: Société Anonyme
- Traded as: Euronext Paris: GFC; CAC Mid 60
- ISIN: FR0010040865
- Industry: Real Estate
- Founded: 1959
- Headquarters: Paris, France
- Key people: Jérôme Brunel (chairman of the board of directors), Méka Brunel (chief executive officer)
- Brands: YouFirst
- Revenue: (€673 million euros in 2019)
- Net income: €513.3 million in 2019
- Total equity: €9 billion euros in June 2020
- Number of employees: 513
- Website: www.gecina.fr

Gecina is a French real estate group that owns, manages and develops property holdings worth 20 billion euros by end-June 2020, with nearly 97% located in the Paris Region. Gecina is a French real estate investment trust (SIIC) listed on Euronext Paris and employs nearly 500 people. The Group's business is built around the leading office portfolio in France and Europe, alongside residential assets and student residences, with over 9,000 apartments.

== History ==
Gecina was created in January 1959 as Groupement pour le Financement de la Construction (GFC), attracting funds from around 60 insurance companies to finance the development of residential buildings.

The company changed its name to Gecina in 1998 when it acquired the real estate company Foncina. Gecina continued to develop, acquiring several real estate companies, and with the takeover of Simco in 2003, almost doubled in size to become France's largest real estate group. In 2003, Gecina adopted the “SIIC” real estate investment trust status (société d’investissement immobilier cotée) enabling it to diversify its portfolio and develop its presence in the commercial sector.

In June 2017, Gecina announced its acquisition of Eurosic for 3.3 billion euros, enabling it to become Europe's fourth-largest real estate group and the market leader for office real estate. In 2016, Eurosic acquired Foncière de Paris, which had previously merged with Foncière Paris France in 2013.

In 2018, the Caisse de dépôt et placement du Québec became Gecina's leading shareholder, with a 23% interest.

On July 21, 2018, Gecina sold chain restaurants belonging primarily to Léon de Bruxelles and Courtepaille for nearly 20 million euros. These assets had been held since Eurosic was acquired in 2017.

In 2020, Gecina created a dedicated subsidiary to house its residential business with a view to developing its residential portfolio in the most central sectors of major cities, aimed at middle-class households.

== Strategy ==
In 2015, Gecina's business was focused on office real estate in Paris’ main business districts. It continued to develop by acquiring office buildings in business districts in La Défense (acquisition of Tour T1), Boulogne (acquisition of the City 2 building), the Lyon region (acquisition of Sky 56) and Paris’ central business district (acquisition of 145 rue de Courcelles and 34 rue Guersant).

In 2016, it sold its healthcare real estate portfolio. In July 2018, Gecina changed its target and set out its plans to focus more on residential real estate, especially in Paris. This strategy was confirmed with the creation of a dedicated subsidiary to house its residential business, approved by the general meeting on April 23, 2020.

Gecina intends to “maintain a Group share allocation of its portfolio with around 80% office assets and 20% residential assets”. The company therefore plans to develop both activities - commercial and residential - while looking into opportunities to transform certain commercial assets into residential properties. This is the case of an office building in Paris’ 14th arrondissement, which has been made available for emergency housing.

In 2019, Gecina launched YouFirst, its client-centric brand, confirming the company's transition from a B to B approach to a more B to B to C approach.

== Governance ==
In 2016, 2017, 2018 and 2019, Gecina was ranked first on the SBF 120 for the representation of women in management structures.

Méka Brunel was appointed as its chief executive officer in January 2017.

== Portfolio ==
Gecina's portfolio includes properties designed by leading French and international architects including Ateliers Jean Nouvel, Jean-Paul Viguier, Valode & Pistre, Skidmore, Owings and Merrill, Atelier Zündel Cristea, Elisabeth Naud & Luc Poux, Foster + Partners, Franklin Azzi, Anthony Béchu, CALQ, Chaix & Morel, DTACC, François Leclercq, Jean Dubuisson, Dusapin-Leclercq, Franck Hammoutène, Lobjoy & Bouvier, and Pei Cobb Freed & Partners.

Some of the buildings in the portfolio include Tour Mirabeau, Tour Horizons, and Tour T1. Former holdings included the Beaugrenelle Shopping Center (sold in 2014) and the LVMH building at 101 Avenue des Champs-Élysées (sold in 2023).

Tour T1

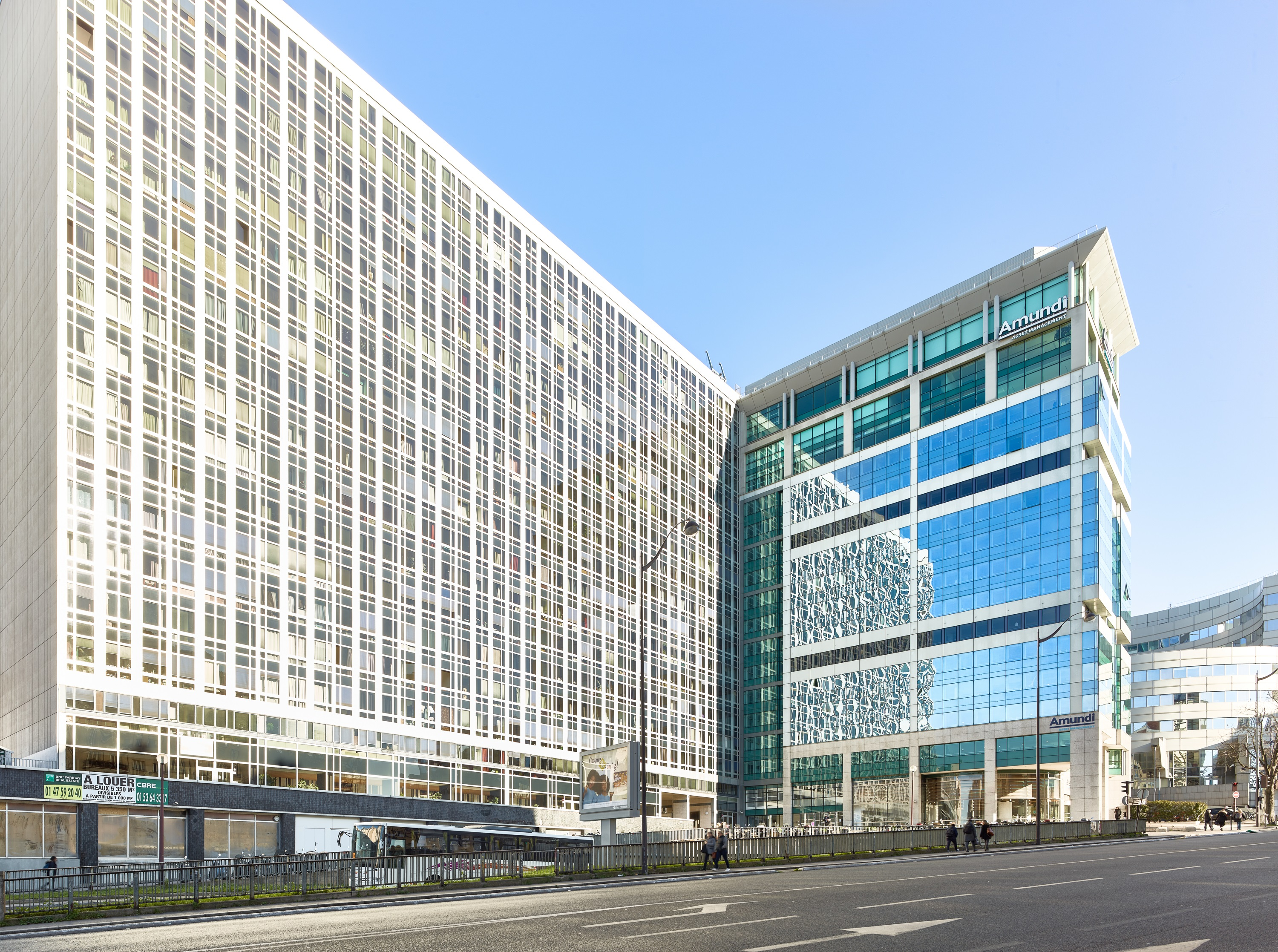
Résidence Pasteur

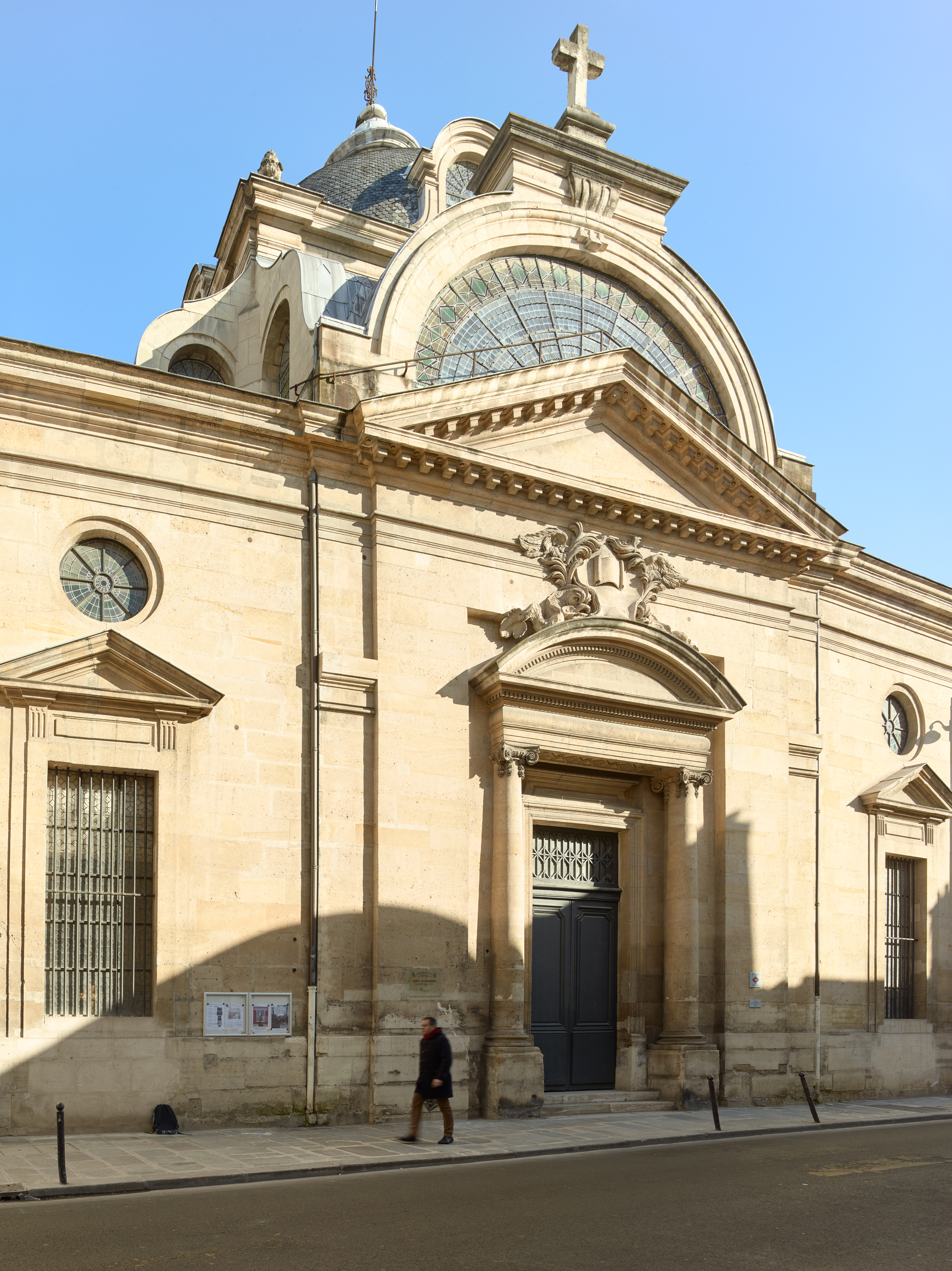
Penthemont

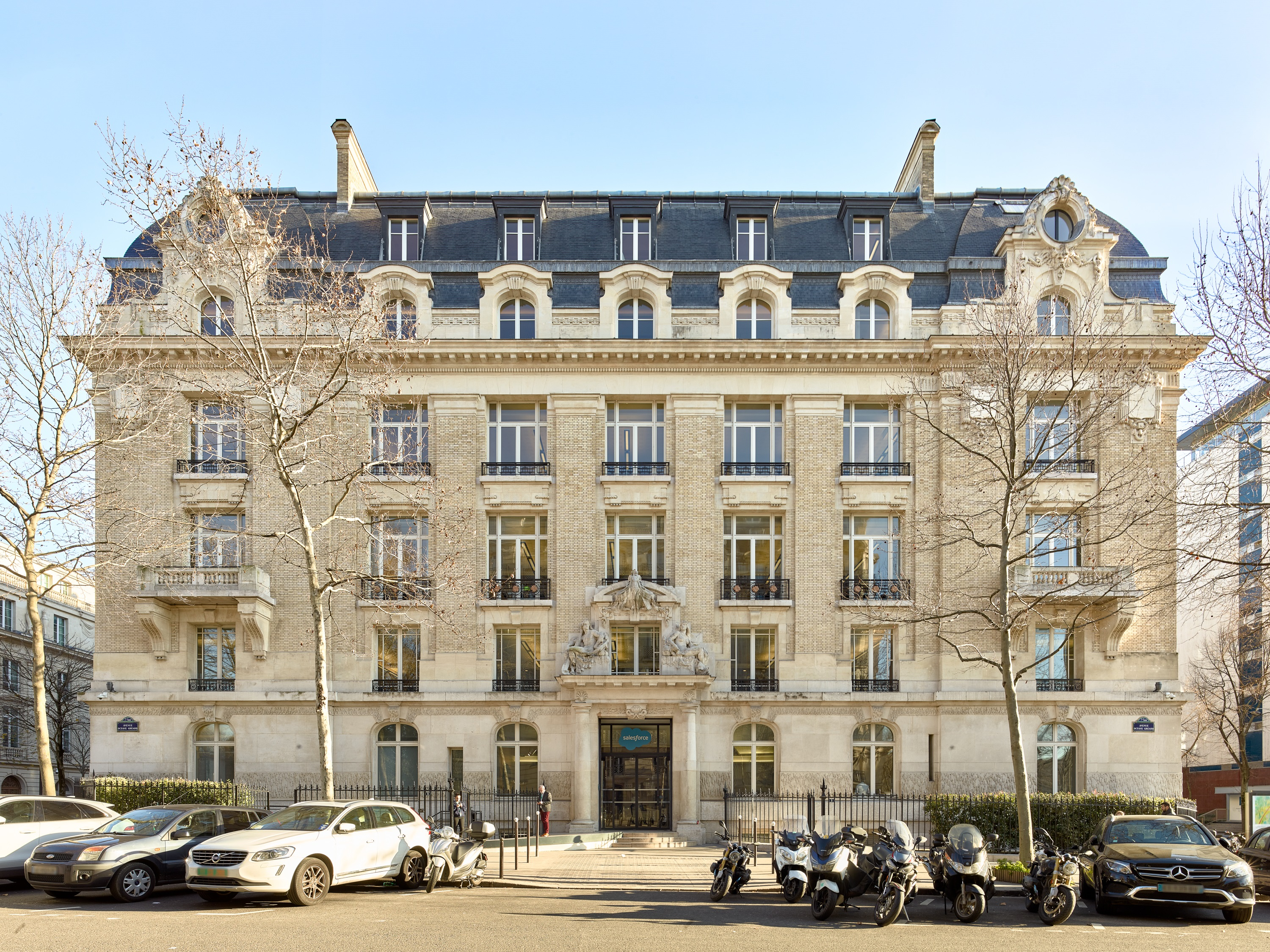
Octave-Gréard

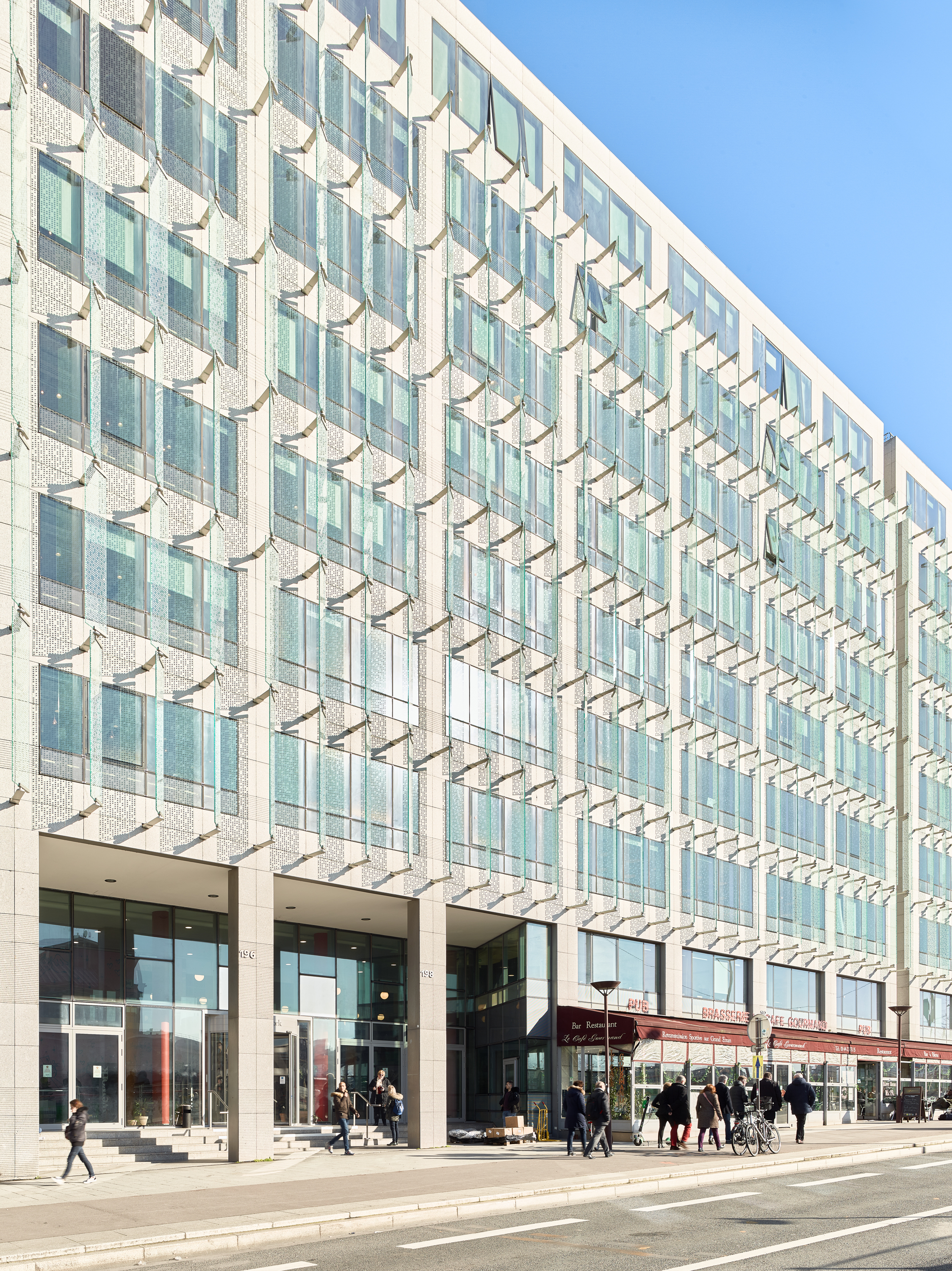
Le France

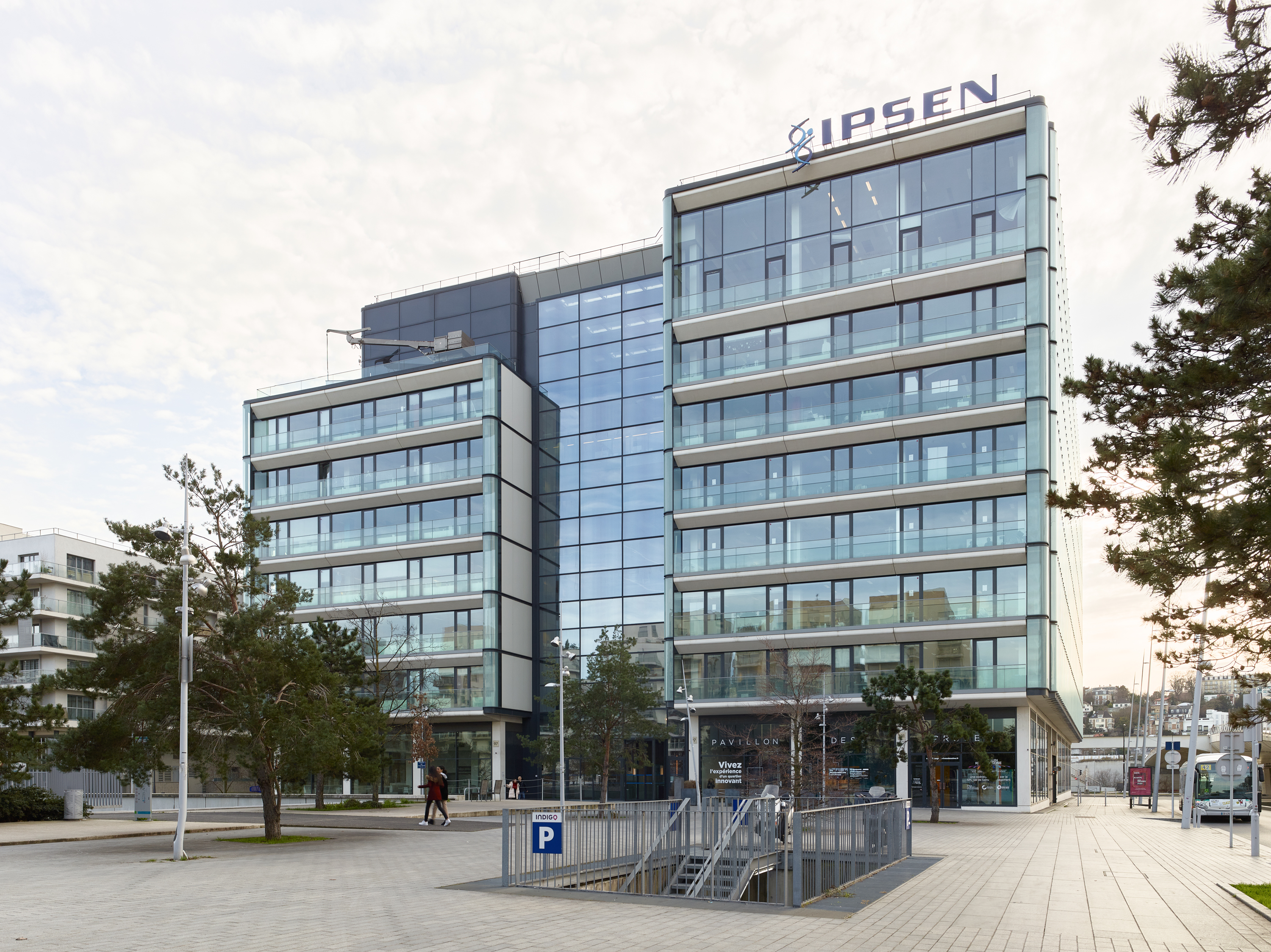
Khapa

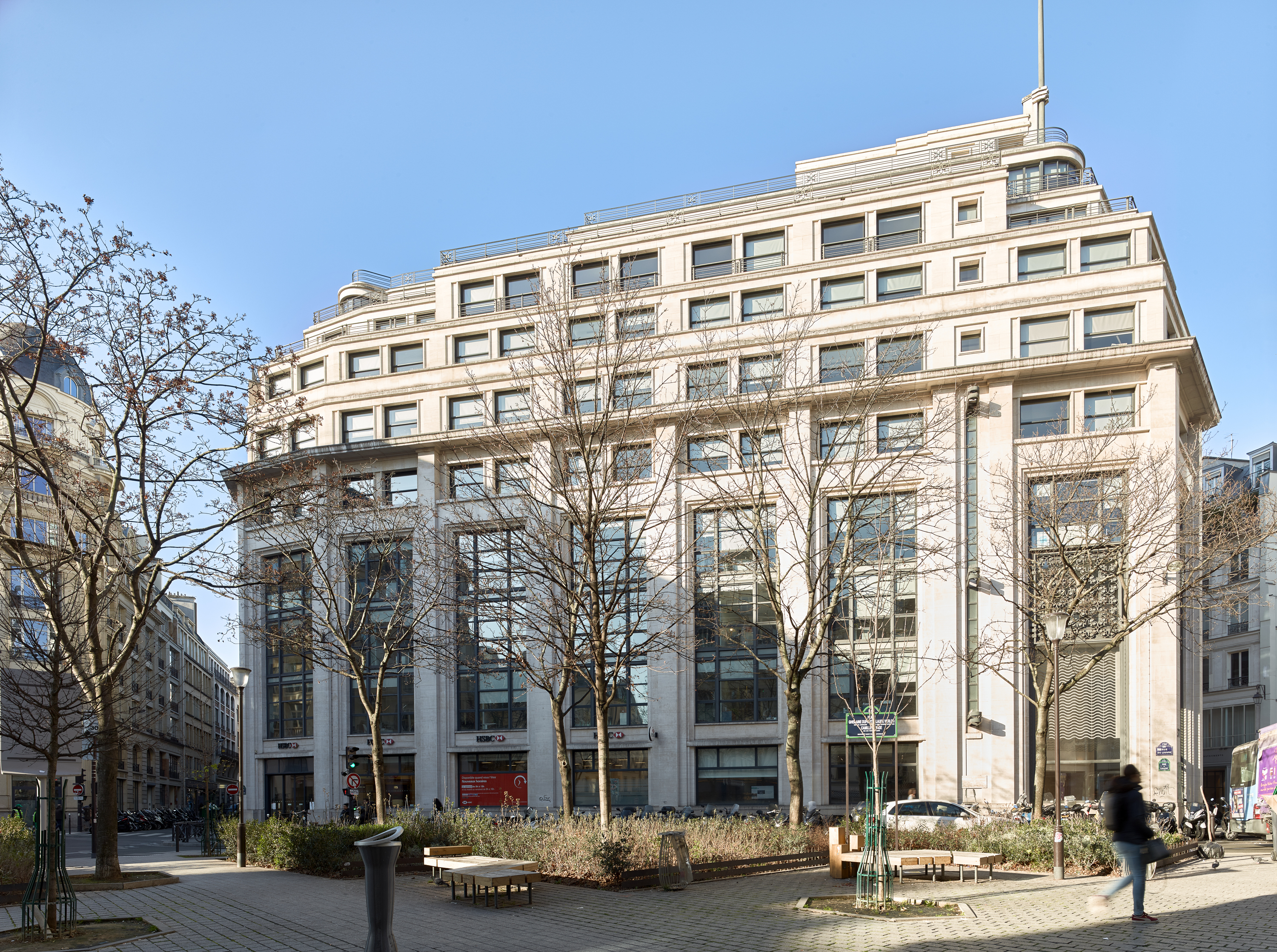
Le Building

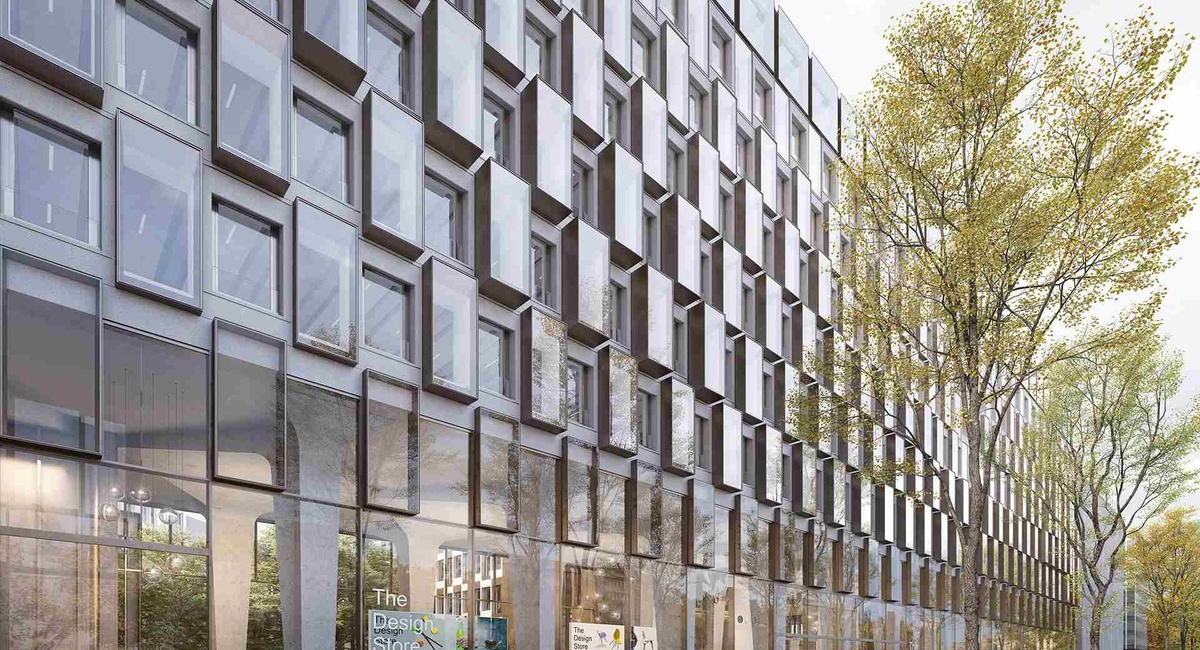
L1ve

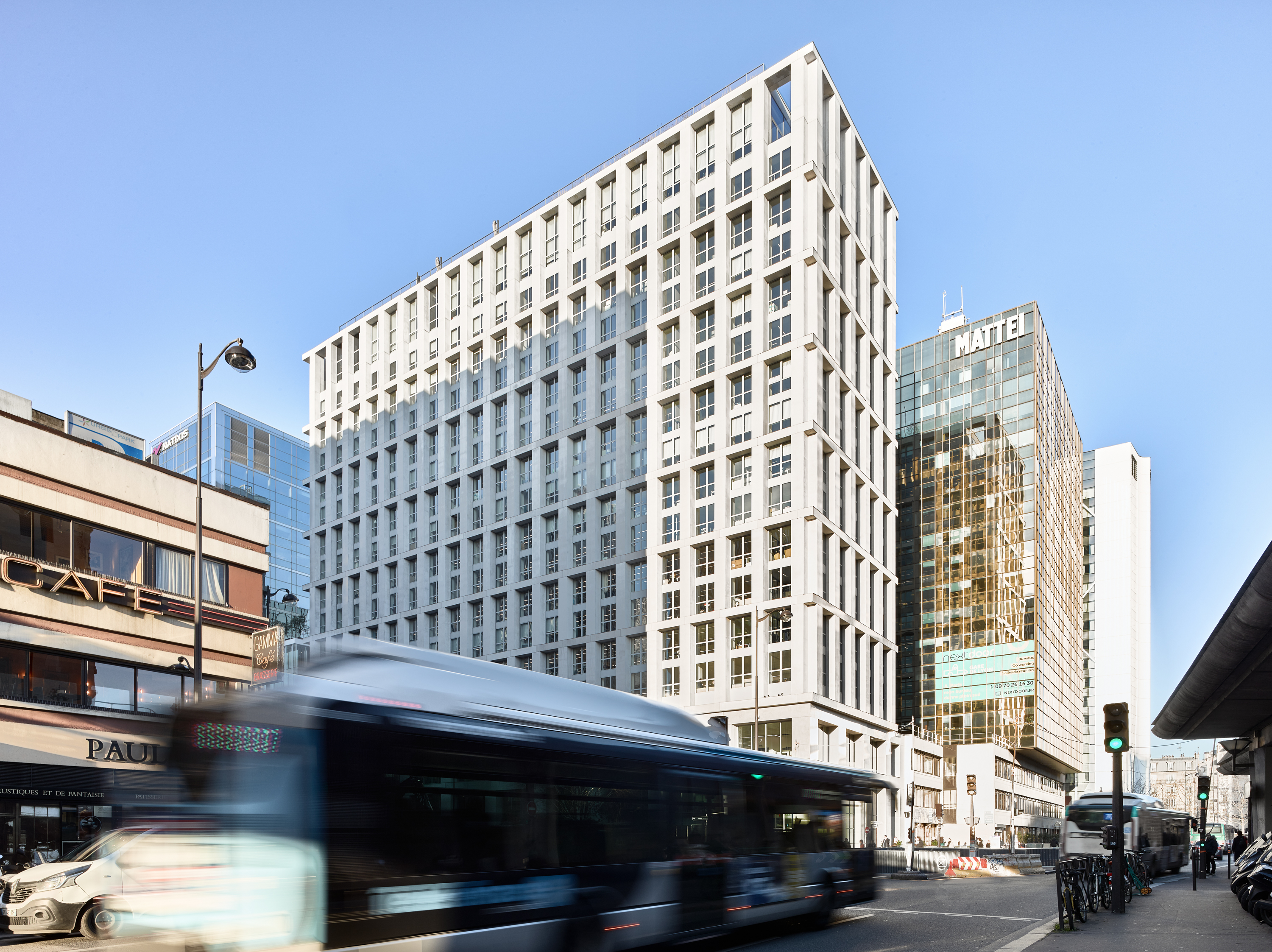
Ibox

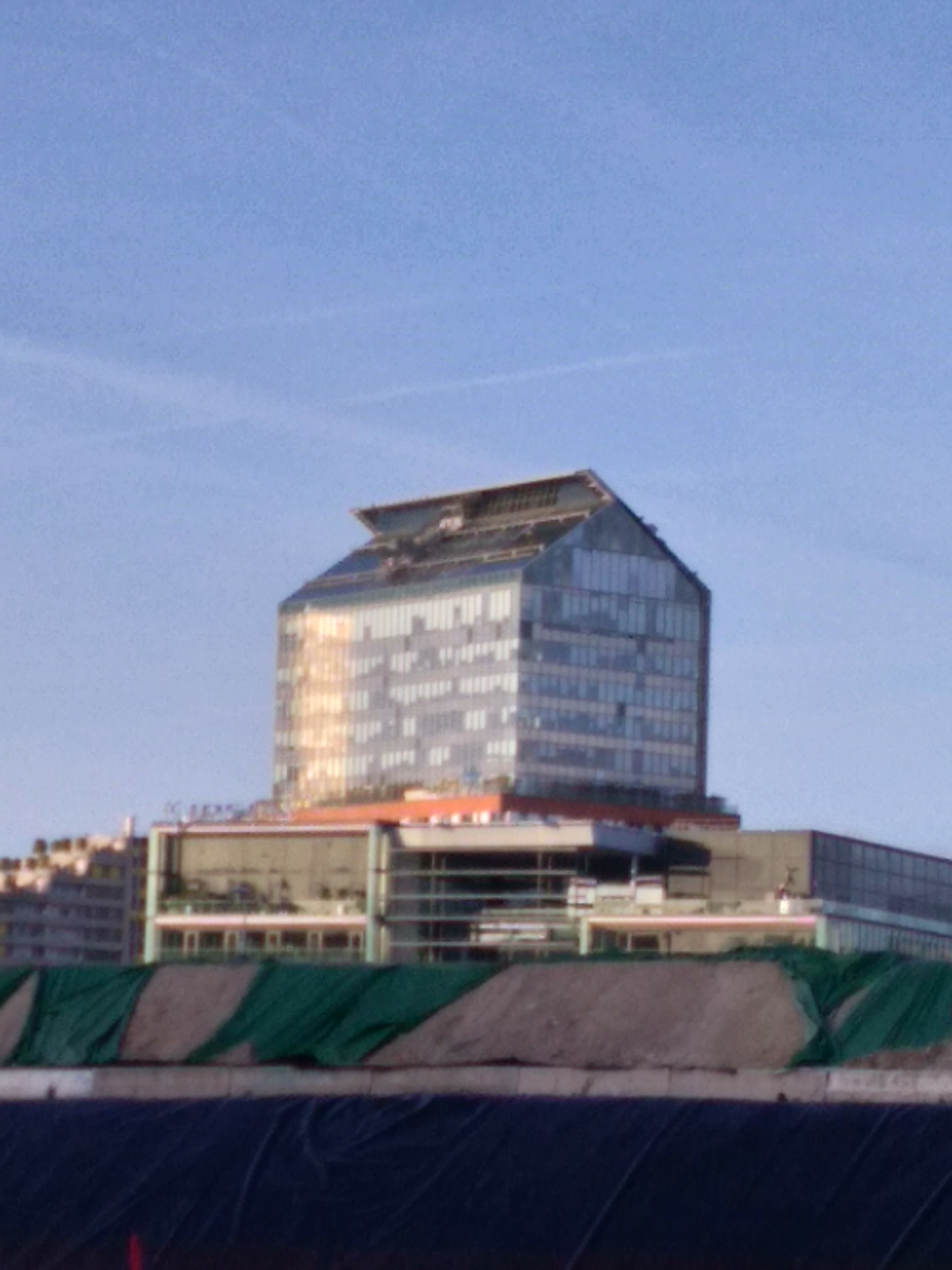
Tour Horizons
