= List of cults of personality =

A cult of personality is a system of worshipful behavior through uncritical flattery and praise directed at national leaders. Cults of personality use various techniques, including the mass media, propaganda, the arts, patriotism, and government-organized demonstrations and rallies to create a heroic image of a leader and maintain power.

== Afghanistan ==
Nur Muhammad Taraki of the People's Democratic Party of Afghanistan served as President of Afghanistan from 1978 to 1979, when he told people to refer to him with titles such as the "Great Leader" and hung his portrait all across the Democratic Republic of Afghanistan. In the 1990s, Uzbek warlord general Abdul Rashid Dostum, who controlled most of northern Afghanistan, created a similar cult of personality in the region.

== Albania ==
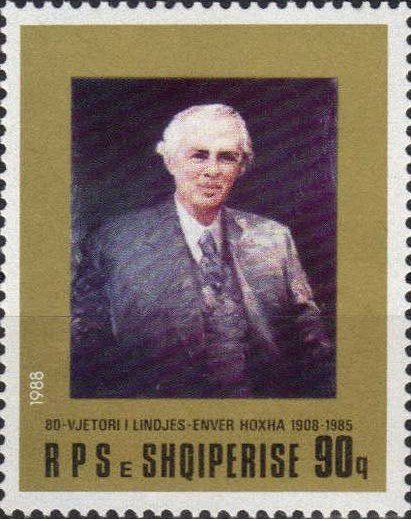
Enver Hoxha on a 1988 postage stamp of Albania

The long-time ruler of Communist Albania, Enver Hoxha, had what the OECD called "an overwhelming cult of personality and an ultra-centralized, authoritarian form of decision-making". Hoxha was widely portrayed as a genius who commented on virtually all facets of life from culture to economics to military matters. Statues of him were erected in cities. Textbooks were required to include quotations of his about their particular subjects. The ruling party of the time, the Party of Labour of Albania, granted him honorific titles such as "Supreme Comrade", "Sole Force" and "Great Teacher". When Hoxha died in 1985, Ramiz Alia took power. Robert D. McFadden of The New York Times wrote that Alia's policies of liberalization were "too little, too late", and the country descended into civil war. Alia served one year in prison for corruption, but the anarchy prevented further charges from being filed against the former Communist regime.

== Algeria ==
Following the 1965 coup d'état that brought him to power, Houari Boumediene became the focus of an enduring state-sponsored cult of personality, though generally less elaborate than those of several contemporary Arab leaders. The Algerian government portrayed Boumediene as the principal architect of the "Corrective Revolution" (Arabic: التصحيح الثوري), emphasizing his leadership in state-building, socialist economic planning, agrarian reform, the nationalization of hydrocarbons, and Algeria's prominent role in the Non-Aligned Movement.

His portrait was displayed in government buildings, schools, and public institutions, while state media, educational materials, and official commemorations presented him as the embodiment of the ideals of the Algerian Revolution and national sovereignty. Annual celebrations of the 19 June coup further reinforced his central position in the state's historical narrative. Algiers' main airport is also named after him.

Boumediene's legacy has continued to receive official recognition long after his death in 1978. Algerian authorities have regularly organized commemorative ceremonies marking the anniversaries of his birth, death, and accession to power. This official rehabilitation has also been reflected in the erection of public monuments, including the recent unveiling of a statue in his honor, underscoring the enduring place Boumediene occupies in Algeria's official historical memory.

== Argentina ==
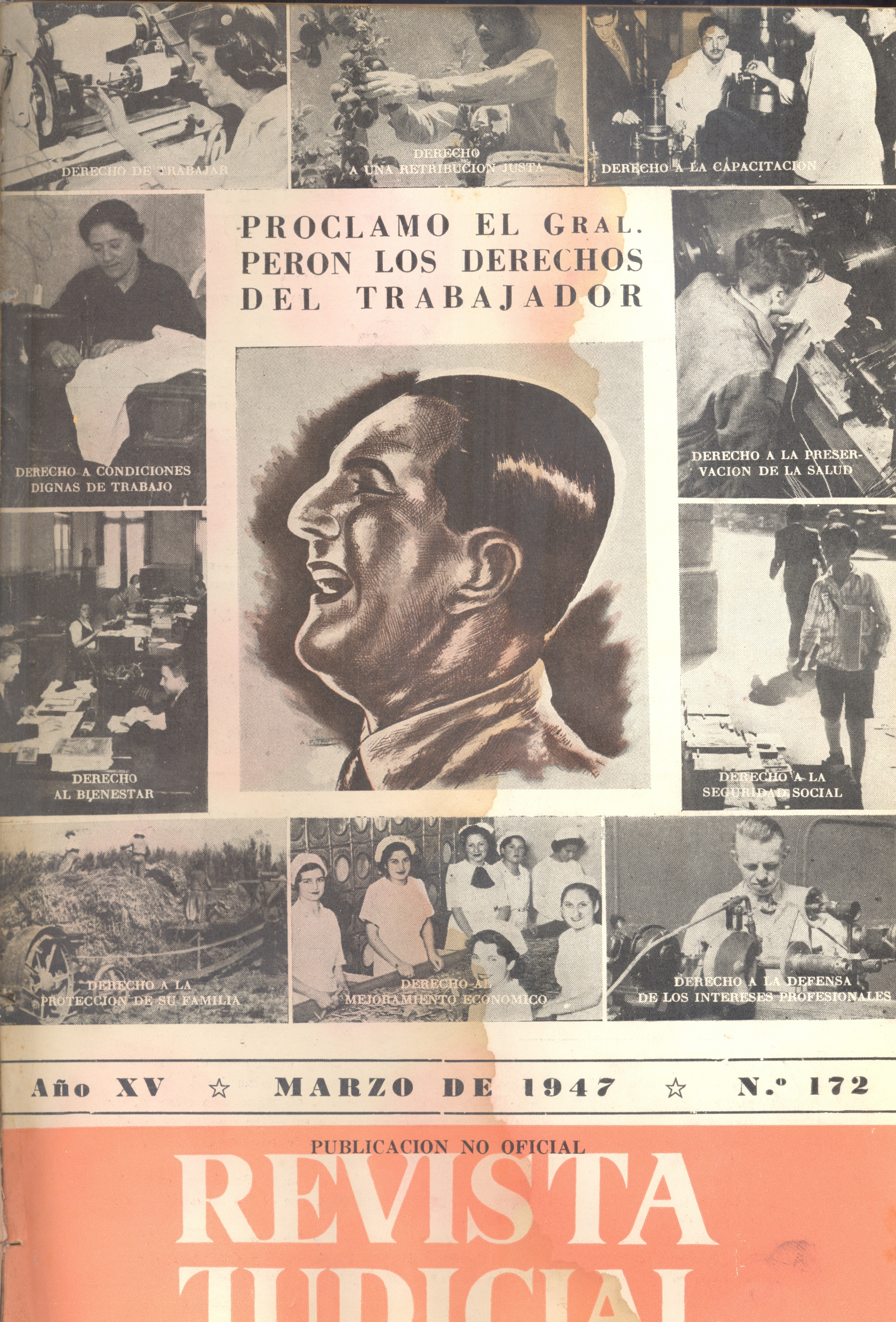
1947 magazine cover depicting Juan Domingo Perón

Juan Perón, elected three times as President of Argentina, and his second wife, Eva "Evita" Perón, were immensely popular among many of the Argentine people, and to this day they are still considered icons by the leading Justicialist Party. Followers of Perón praised his effort in creating a monolithic labour movement, while their detractors considered him a demagogue and a dictator that ferociously persecuted dissents and swiftly eroded the republican principles of the country as a way to stay in power. Following his election a personality cult developed around both Perón and Evita.

== Austria ==
After his assassination by Austrian Nazis in 1934, a cult of personality was formed around Engelbert Dollfuss, who had served as chancellor and dictator of Austria from 1932. The cult was launched under his successor Kurt Schuschnigg, and portrayed Dollfuss as "a martyr for Austria's freedom, a saintly patriot with a mystic aura." As well as streets and squares being named after him, monuments were erected to his memory, and in some religious frescoes in churches a figure representing Dollfuss was included. After his assassination, a church was erected in Vienna where the remains of Dollfuss and another former chancellor, Ignaz Seipel, were interred. Furthermore, a votive church dedicated to Dollfuss was opened at Hohe Wand outside Vienna in 1935.

The personality cult around Dollfuss came to an end with the Anschluss in 1938. However, the incorporation of Austria into Nazi Germany came to legitimize the veneration of Dollfuss, especially among supporters and members of his party, the Fatherland Front (VF). Consequently, a Dollfuss cult of a lesser degree was retained among members of the new Austrian People's Party (ÖVP) in the post-war era: in 1954 the votive church at Hohe Wand was restored by the ÖVP, and Dollfuss's portrait hung at the party's parliamentary headquarters until 2017. In 1998, Dollfuss's birth house in Texingtal was made into a museum, described as having an "apologetic orientation", on the initiative of the ÖVP-led regional government.

== Azerbaijan ==
Heydar Aliyev's cult of personality became a significant part of Azerbaijani politics and society after Heydar Aliyev came to power in 1993 and it continued after his death in 2003, when his son Ilham Aliyev succeeded him. Aliyev, a former Soviet politburo member and the leader of Soviet Azerbaijan from 1969 to 1987, became the President of Azerbaijan in 1993. He then began to carefully design an autocratic system, with heavy reliance on family and clan members, oil revenues and patronage.

In Azerbaijan, Heydar Aliyev is presented as the "Father of the Azeri nation", often compared to Mustafa Kemal Atatürk.

== Belarus ==
A personality cult has been described as surrounding Alexander Lukashenko, who has served as president of Belarus since the office's establishment in 1994. Lukashenko is frequently referred to as "the First" by state media, and as "Bat'ka" ("father") by his supporters. In 2023, an observer noted that "Belarusian schoolchildren visit places associated with […] Lukashenko, the state film studio Belarusfilm is planning a movie about the strongman," and that "[q]uotes by Lukashenko are printed on articles of clothing, and a new flagship store has opened in the capital Minsk expressly for this type of fashion."

Vadim Mojeiko, an analyst with the Belarusian Institute for Social Studies (BISS), notes that Lukashenko tends to be depicted as "a humble person who almost had to be convinced to allow a movie to be made about him." According to Mojeiko, however, this is "another part of a personality cult, pretending that initiatives like this were started by the people. In reality, Lukashenko likes to be admired, which he has made quite clear in public."

== Bolivia ==
Evo Morales, president of Bolivia from 2006 to 2019, was criticized for having a cult of personality. During his reign over Bolivia, there were more than 100 works named after him, including sports venues and schools, as well as 24 named after his parents. During the interim government led by Jeanine Áñez, statues of Morales were removed, and locations named after him were renamed.

In 2025, Morales created a new party called EVO Pueblo, which was criticized for sharing his name. Former president Jorge Quiroga called it an "egoistical project" and said "When someone starts building museums, naming streets and creating districts after himself, he's already lost his mind. That man is lost".

== Brazil ==
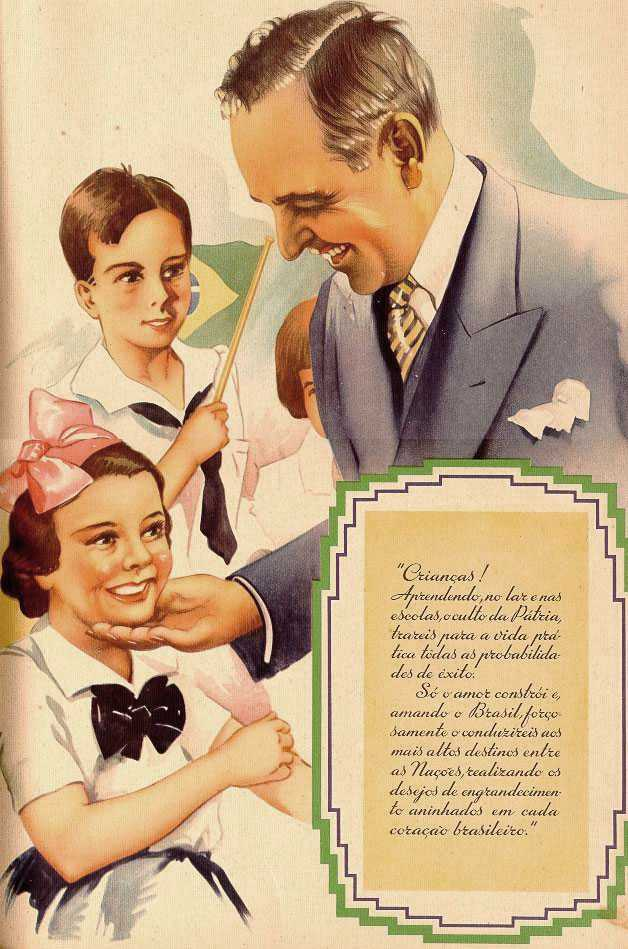
Estado Novo propaganda depicting Getúlio Vargas, c. 1938

During the Vargas era, and in particular during the so-called Estado Novo from 1937 to 1946, the Brazilian Department of Information and Propaganda (DIP) promoted a cult of personality around Getúlio Vargas through propaganda extolling him as a Messiah-style "saviour of the Brazilian people" and mandating the placement of Vargas's portrait in public offices and businesses. Vargas would also make weekly radio broadcasts in which he promoted the values of nationalism and work.

In recent years there has been a growing cult of personality in modern Brazil around the Brazilian presidents Luiz Inácio Lula da Silva, promoted by the leftist Workers' Party, and Jair Bolsonaro, promoted by right-wing militants.

== Bangladesh ==
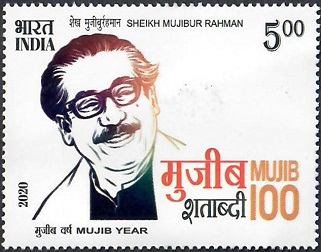
Mujib on a 2021 postage stamp of India

Bangladeshi political party, Awami League has been accused of promoting a personality cult around Sheikh Mujibur Rahman. (Note: Multiple references:) Mujib continues to be a revered, popular, divisive, and controversial figure in Bangladesh. During his daughter Sheikh Hasina's rule from 2009 to 2024, the Awami League had ruled Bangladesh based on a cult of personality around his legacy.

== Bulgaria ==
Several leaders of the People's Republic of Bulgaria were made the objects of cults of personality. Georgi Dimitrov, the first leader of the People's Republic from 1946 until his death in 1949, was already an internationally known figure at the time: in 1933, he had been accused of plotting the Reichstag fire, but was acquitted following a highly publicized trial in Nazi Germany, and from 1935 he had served as General Secretary of the Communist International in Moscow. As a result, "a kind of sub-cult [around Dimitrov] within the general framework of the Soviet leader cults" predated the cult around him as national leader of Bulgaria. Examples of Dimitrov's cult within Bulgaria include the town of Dimitrovgrad, a planned city founded in 1947, and the Georgi Dimitrov Mausoleum in Sofia, where his embalmed body lay on display from his death in 1949 until 1990.

Vasil Kolarov, who succeeded Dimitrov as Bulgaria's leader but died in 1950, was also buried in the mausoleum, and his birth city Shumen was named Kolarovgrad between 1950 and 1965. The cult around Kolarov's successor Valko Chervenkov is said to have taken even more grandiose forms: one example is "a contrived 'folk song' written in the traditional Slavic antithesis form, […] stating that there are 'not two nightingales singing in the garden' but 'two true friends, the very good Stalin and comrade Chervenkov,' who 'spoke only one word,' namely, 'peace.'" When Chervenkov was unseated by Todor Zhivkov in 1954, one point of criticism against him was that he had set up his own personality cult.

== Burkina Faso ==
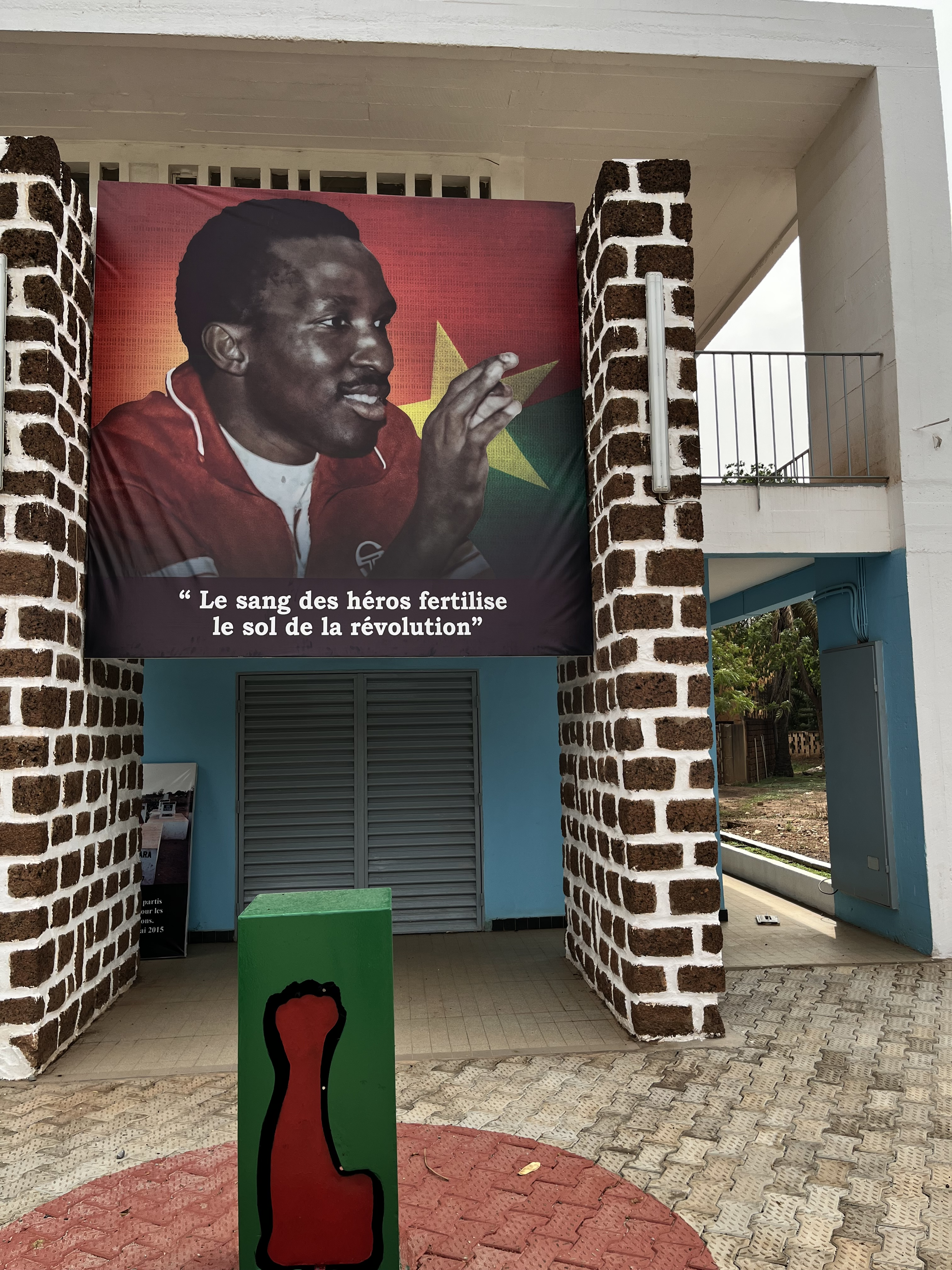
Thomas Sankara memorial, place where presumably he was killed

Thomas Sankara during his regime from 1983 to 1987 tried to prevent cults of personality, including hanging posters of him, claiming that there are already "seven million Sankaras". Nevertheless, after his assassination, a posthumous cult of him arose in Burkina Faso after the 2022 Burkinabe military coup; a street in the capital Ouagadougou originally named after Charles De Gaulle for example was renamed after Sankara, and his body was exhumed into a mausoleum in 2025.

Ibrahim Traoré, the president of Burkina Faso since 2022, is the subject of a personality cult, especially online. His followers celebrate his commitment to Pan-Africanism and anti-imperialism, as well as continuing the legacy of previous Burkinabe leader Sankara. However, Russian and Russian-backed media outlets are involved in promoting this cult, including through the use of AI-generated videos and fake news.

== Cambodia ==
During its first three years in power, the Khmer Rouge concealed Pol Pot's name and so did not instill a cult of personality around him, only referring to "Angkar" or the "Organization" with a god-like quality which commanded absolute, unquestioning loyalty from the Cambodian people as the new ultimate authority in Cambodian society. Worsening relations with Vietnam prompted the Khmer Rouge to portray Pol Pot as a wartime leader whom the people could rally around. Even as plaster images and portraits of him were prepared for public distribution, similar to those of Kim Il Sung and Mao Zedong, Angkar referred to itself as an entity rather than a personality cult which contributed to the mystique and power of the regime, as the source of power was absolute. Though the Vietnamese invasion cut these plans short, a less extreme version of Pol Pot's cult of personality continued to exist in the areas which were under the control of Khmer Rouge remnants. His grave has been the subject of cultic activities, with people paying respects to his grave during the Cambodian New Year and the Cambodian Festival of the Dead.

== Central African Republic ==
Jean-Bédel Bokassa was the president of the Central African Republic and Empire from 1966 to 1979 who by changing his title from "President for life" to "Emperor" in 1977 after his coronation, which imitated the coronation of Napoleon, his autocratic regime involved in excessive luxury, and many human rights abuses.

== Chile ==
General Augusto Pinochet, who took power in a military coup in 1973 to 1990, has been affectionally called 'Tata' or grandfather by his supporters and in 1981 was bestowed the honorary military rank of "captain general", a title originally used by the Spanish colonial governors of Chile. In 1989, indigenous Mapuche groups representing the "Consejos Regionales" bestowed Pinochet the title Ulmen Füta Lonko or Great Authority. In addition, multiple songs have been made to commemorate his existence.

== China ==
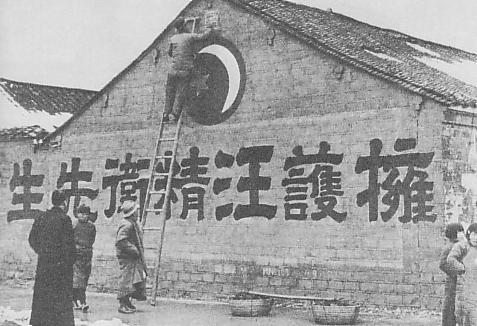
Personality cult of Wang Jingwei

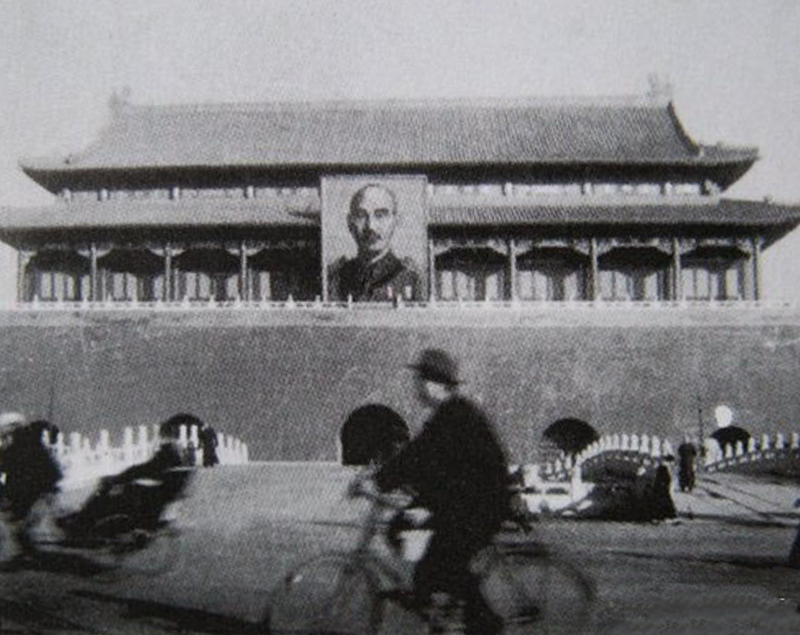
Portrait of Chiang Kai-shek on Tiananmen before the Communist takeover

=== Republic of China ===
A personality cult in the Republic of China was centered on the Kuomintang party founder Sun Yat-sen, with his successor, President Wang Jingwei and Generalissimo Chiang Kai-shek. The personality cult of Chiang Kai-shek went further after the republican government fled to Taiwan. He was usually referred to as "Lord Chiang" (蔣公) in public and a space between the characters of his name and title was required in printed materials. Articles in textbooks and songs glorifying him were commonly seen in Taiwan before 1987 – for example, students were required to memorise the Chiang Kai-shek Memorial Song before Lee Teng-hui ascended to the presidency.

=== People's Republic of China ===
Statue of Mao Zedong in modern China

The People's Republic of China under Chairman Mao Zedong also developed a cult of personality, the most obvious symbol of which is his massive portrait situated on the north end of Tiananmen Square. The culture of the People's Republic of China before 1978 was highly influenced by the personality cult of Mao Zedong which reached its peak during the Cultural Revolution. Mao was referred to as "the great leader Chairman Mao" (伟大领袖毛主席) in public and he was entitled "the great leader, the great supreme commander, the great teacher and the great helmsman" (伟大的领袖、伟大的统帅、伟大的导师、伟大的舵手) in Cultural Revolution. Badges and "little red books" of his quotations were mass-produced. Most people were required to recite the Quotations of Chairman Mao and printed material at that time usually quoted Mao's words in bold as well as in the preface. The Loyalty dance (忠字舞) was also introduced during the Cultural Revolution which lasted from 1966 to 1976.

The cult of personality continued for a time after Mao's death. His successor Chairman Hua Guofeng also practiced a cult of personality and he was referred to as "the brilliant leader Chairman Hua" (英明领袖华主席). Reform and opening up in 1978 led to a deconstruction of Mao's cult status and the Chinese Communist Party under Deng Xiaoping and his successors such as Jiang Zemin and Hu Jintao were averse to a Mao cult of personality style of rule lest it recreate the chaos of the Cultural Revolution.

The rise and consolidation of power under General Secretary Xi Jinping has given way to a return to Mao-style personality cult centered around Xi in state media and propaganda messages, with a political theory bearing his name being enshrined into the CCP's constitution in the 19th National Congress in October 2017.

== Colombia ==
Former president Álvaro Uribe became the center of a cult of personality in Colombia in the later years of the country's armed conflict. Supporters refer to him as "The Great Colombian" in spite of his family's ties to the Medellín Cartel and the numerous human rights scandals that marred his presidency. In 2013, after Uribe failed to amend the constitution that would allow him to stay in power for a third term in 2010, he founded a political party – the Democratic Center, that uses the former president's silhouette as logo. The party's attempts to be named after its "only leader" were thwarted in 2012.

== Comoros ==
After taking power in a coup in 1976, Ali Soilih launched a cult of personality to solidify his rule in the Comoros, Soilih referred to himself using sacralized language, reportedly proclaiming: "I am your God and teacher. I am the divine way, the torch that lights the dark. There is no God but Ali Soilih" and took on the title Monzogi which means "The Guide". he would create the Moissy which was the Comorian answer to Mao Zedong's Red Guards, and its methods were similar to those that had been employed by their Chinese counterpart during the Cultural Revolution. After the fall of his regime in 1978, Soilih was captured and killed and his cult of personality was dismantled.

== Croatia ==
Franjo Tuđman, who served as Croatia's first president between 1990 and 1999 after independence from Yugoslavia, has been mentioned as having fostered a "mini personality cult". Tuđman's party, the Croatian Democratic Union (HDZ), framed the 1990 parliamentary elections, where the HDZ won a majority of seats, as a resurrection of the Croatian nation, and Tuđman as a Messiah-like figure; for instance, HDZ politician Neven Jurica referred to Tuđman as "the new Father of the Homeland" after 19th-century Croatian nationalist leader Ante Starčević.

Tuđman's cult is seen as having reached its peak with his 75th birthday in 1997, with all state institutions and higher officials being involved in the celebrations, and the Croatian National Bank releasing a unique set of souvenir coins. A hours-long play was also televised for the occasion, where various historical figures appeared, and Tuđman was portrayed as "the Messiah who had won independence for Croatia and whose presence would be felt for centuries."

== Cuba ==
Although one of Fidel Castro's alleged dying wishes was, in order to avoid a cult of personality, that buildings or streets would not be named after him or statues of him erected, such a cult had already developed by the time of his death.

A posthumous cult for Che Guevara is also observed both in Cuba and abroad; statues and murals depicting him are as ubiquitous as Fidel's.

== Czechoslovakia ==
=== Inter-war Czechoslovakia ===
Tomáš Masaryk, who served as the first president of Czechoslovakia from the country's founding in 1918 until 1935, has been said to have been the object of a "widespread, if benign" cult of personality. Masaryk was styled "President-Liberator" ("President-osvoboditel") and "Little Father" ("Tatíček"), and in 1919 an embankment in the capital Prague was named after him. Historian Andrea Orzoff writes that Masaryk was "presented as the embodiment of moral rectitude, cosmopolitan erudition, and democratic egalitarianism," in inter-war Czechoslovakia.

The characterization of Masaryk as having a cult of personality around him has been criticized as inappropriate by Eva Broklová of the Masaryk Institute of the Czech Academy of Sciences, given the term's "connotations […] of the cult surrounding Stalin."

=== Post-war Czechoslovakia ===
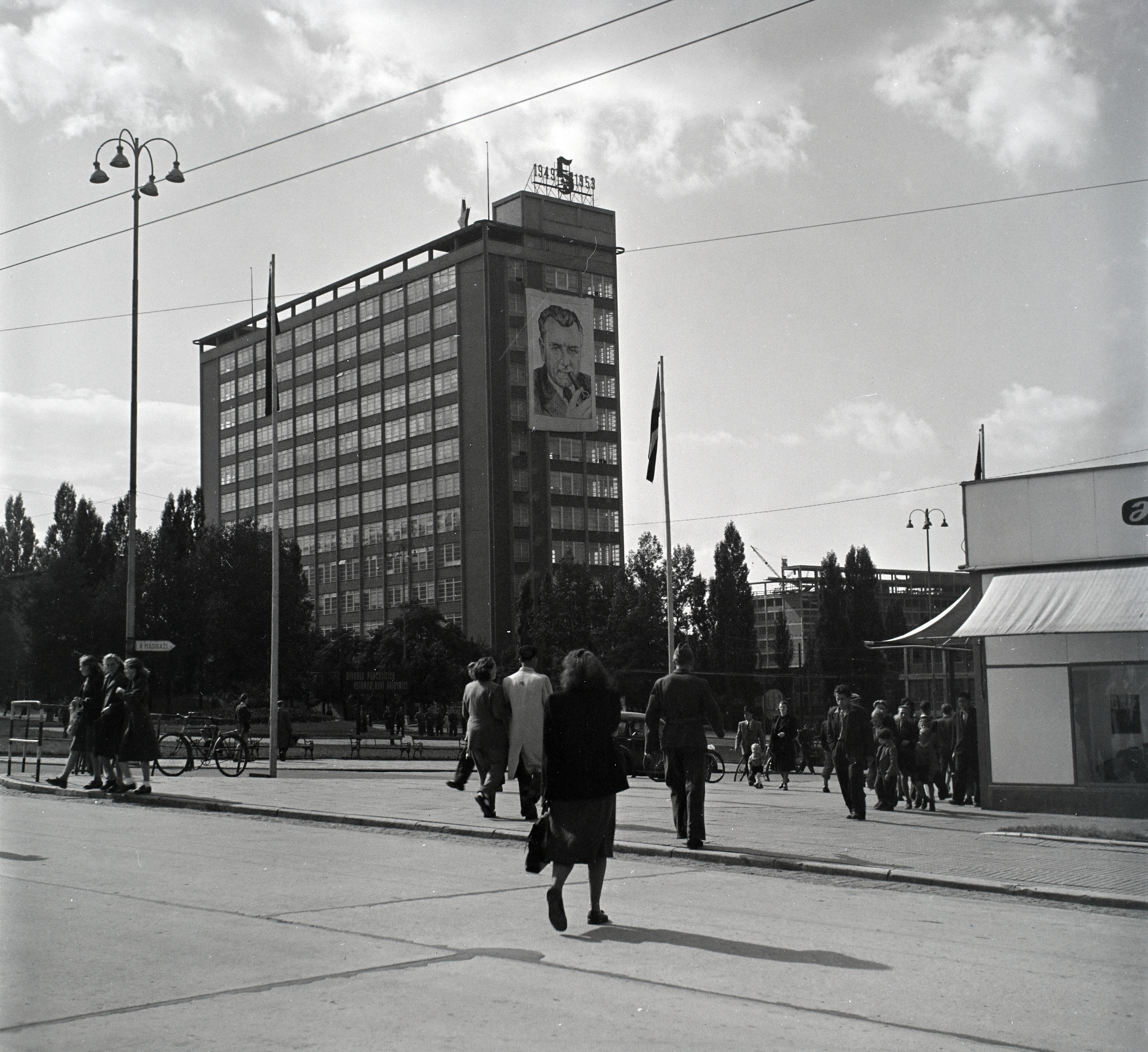
The Baťa Skyscraper in Zlín (then Gottwaldov) pictured in 1949, with a portrait of Klement Gottwald adorning the facade

In the immediate post-war period a cult of personality was created around Klement Gottwald, the leader of the Czechoslovak Socialist Republic from its founding in 1948; for example, the city Zlín was renamed Gottwaldov in 1949. After Gottwald's death in 1953, his embalmed body was initially put on display in a mausoleum at the site of the National Monument at Vítkov in Žižkov, Prague. In the following years, however, the cult around Gottwald was criticized internally within the Communist Party; as a result, the mausoleum was closed in 1962.

== Dominican Republic ==
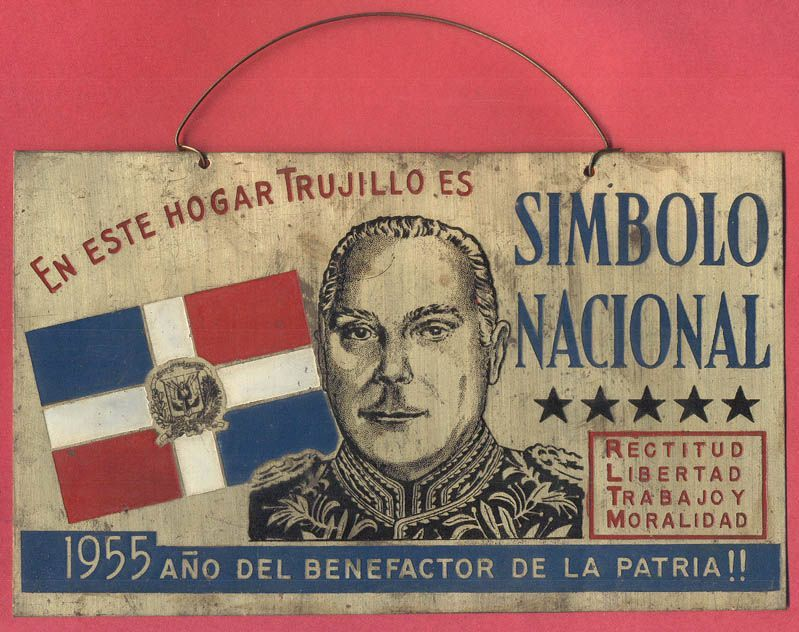
A 1955 sign intended to be displayed in a private home

Dominican President Rafael Trujillo enjoyed a large cult of personality during his tenure and even after his death. In 1936, the Dominican Congress voted to rename the capital of Santo Domingo to Ciudad Trujillo. The same thing was done with the San Cristóbal Province and Pico Duarte (the country's highest peak), with the latter being rebaptized as "Pico Trujillo". National personalities and politicians alike had praise for Trujillo with license plates that included slogans such as "¡Viva Trujillo!" being massed produced on all levels and put on the rears of cars. Commemorative coins and stamps were created after his presidency with his image on the front.

== Egypt ==
The Egyptian state practiced a cult of personality around Gamal Abdel Nasser during his rule. It has been alleged that the Egyptian media has created a personality cult around the current President Abdel Fattah el-Sisi.

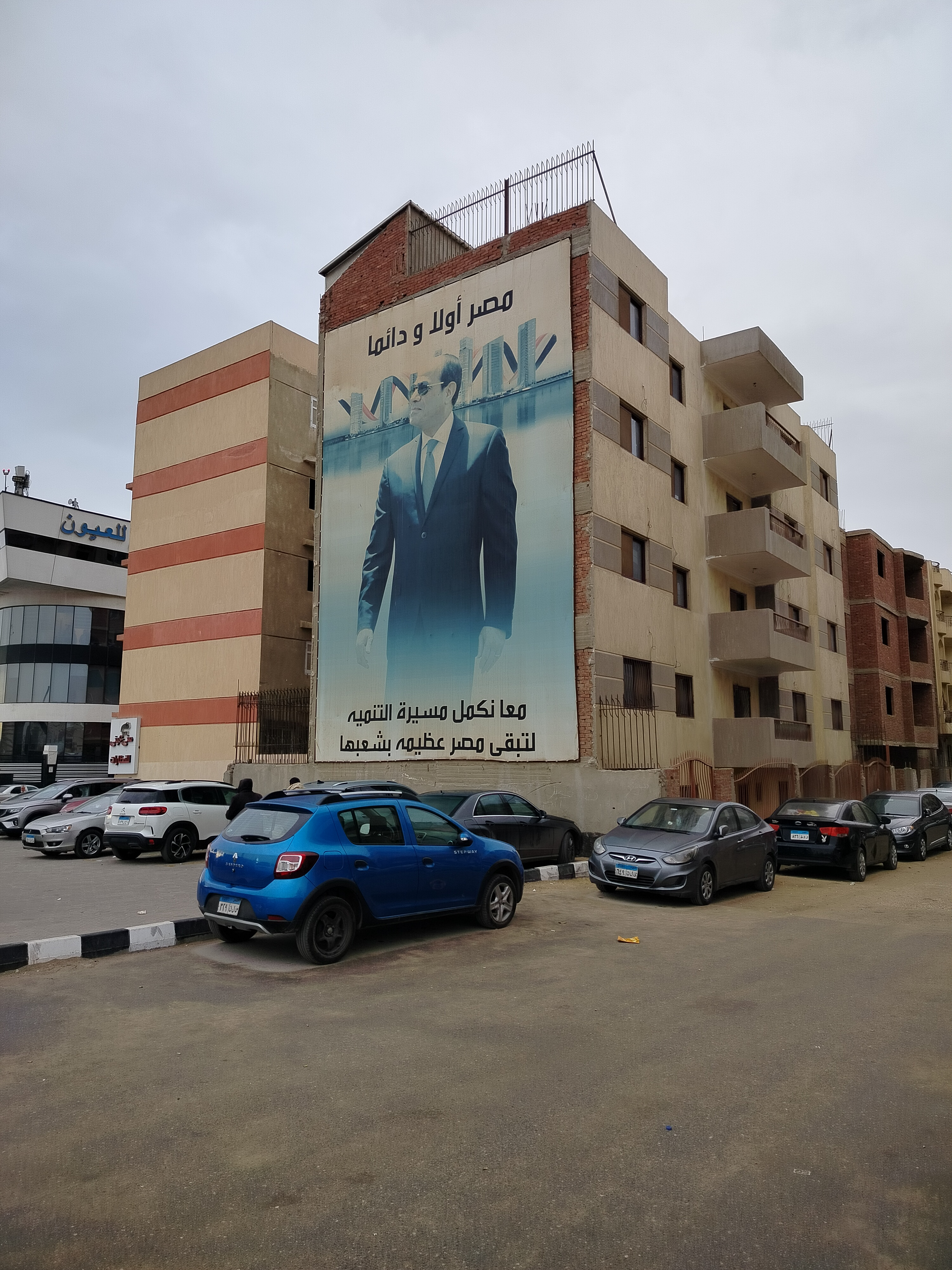
Pro-Sisi billboard in Cairo, reading: Egypt is always first. Together we continue the path of development to make Egypt and its people prosper.

== El Salvador ==
Nayib Bukele allegedly cultivated a cult of personality in El Salvador.

== Equatorial Guinea ==
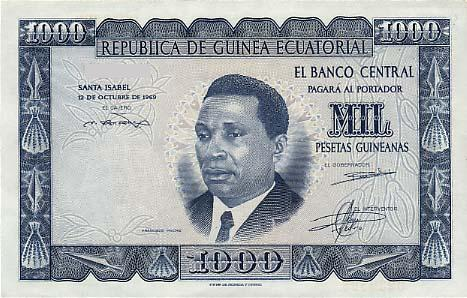
Nguema's depiction in the 1969-issued 1000 pesetas banknote

The first president of Equatorial Guinea, Francisco Macías Nguema, was the centre of an extreme personality cult, perhaps fueled by his consumption of copious amounts of bhang and iboga, and he assigned himself titles such as the "Unique Miracle" and "Grand Master of Education, Science, and Culture". The island of Fernando Pó had its name Africanized after him to Masie Ngueme Biyogo Island; upon his overthrow in 1979, its name was again changed to Bioko. The capital, Santa Isabel, had its name changed to Malabo. In 1978, he changed the national motto of the coat of arms of Equatorial Guinea to "There is no other God than Macias Nguema".

This tradition has been continued by Teodoro Obiang Nguema Mbasogo who has been accused of building his own personality cult. As evidence of this, in July 2003, the state-operated radio declared that Obiang was "the country's god" and that he had "all power over men and things." It added that the president was "in permanent contact with the Almighty" and that he "can decide to kill without anyone calling him to account and without going to hell." He personally made similar comments in 1993. Macías had also proclaimed himself a god.

Obiang has encouraged his cult of personality by ensuring that public speeches end with well-wishing for himself rather than end with well-wishing for the republic. Many important buildings have a presidential lodge, many towns and cities have streets commemorating Obiang's coup against Macías, and many people wear clothes with his face printed on them.

Like his predecessor and other African dictators such as Idi Amin and Mobutu Sese Seko, Obiang has assigned to himself several creative titles. Among them are "gentleman of the great island of Bioko, Annobón and Río Muni." He also refers to himself as El Jefe (the boss).

== France ==
=== Vichy France ===
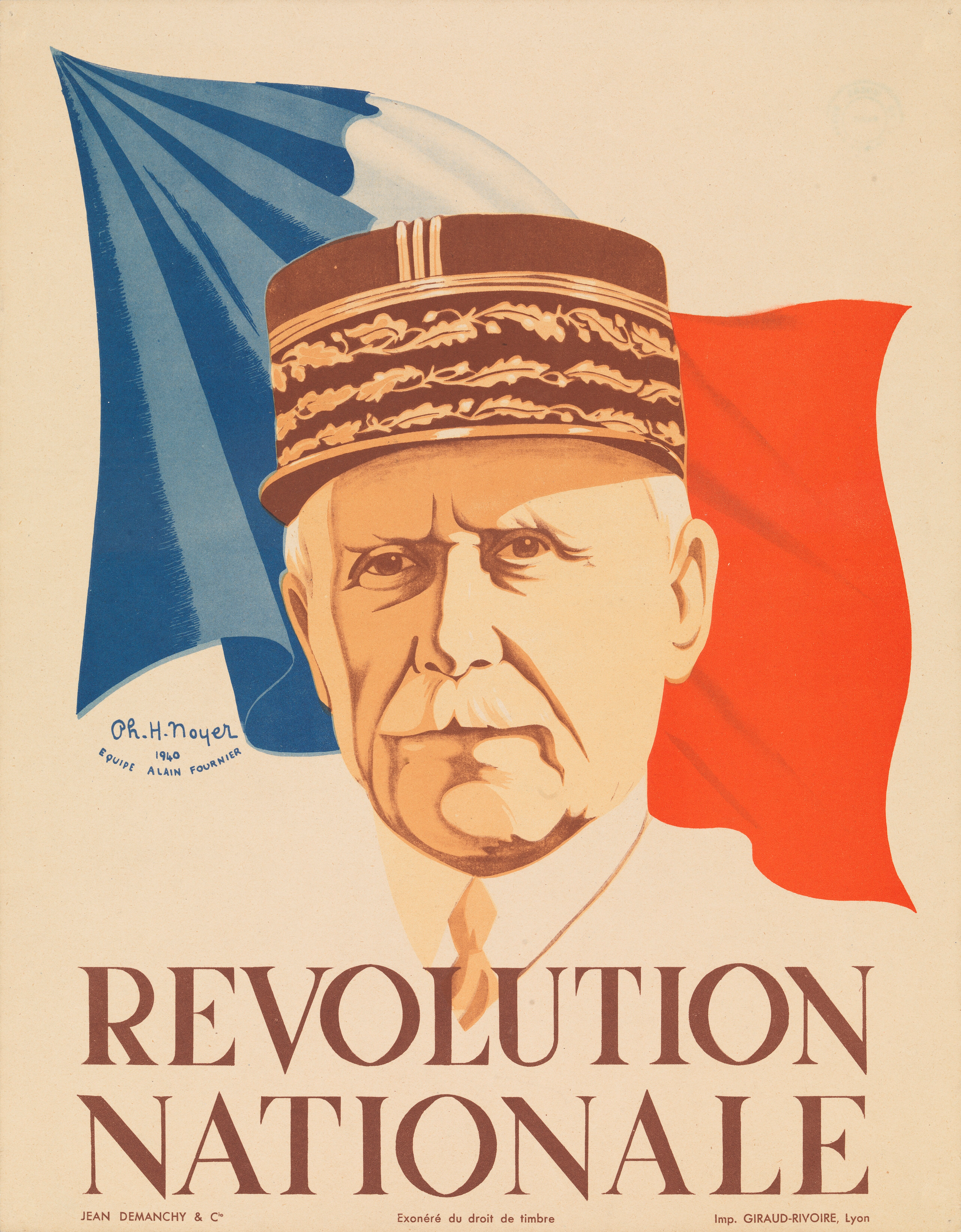
A Révolution nationale propaganda poster depicting Marshal Philippe Pétain

During World War II, after the defeat of France by Nazi Germany in 1940, the Nazis directly occupied about two-thirds of the country, while the remainder was allowed self-government. With its capital in Vichy, this new rump country, whose government was conservative and strongly traditionalist with fascistic aspects, became known as Vichy France. Its president was Marshal Philippe Pétain, a hero of the First World War, around whom a cult of personality was built up. A song dedicated to him, "Maréchal, nous voilà !" (lit. "Marshal, Here We Are!") was mandatory for all school children to learn.

In French Indochina, Cambodian schoolchildren in the early 1940s began their school-day with prayers to Marshal Philippe Pétain of Vichy France, opening with the words, "Our father, which art our Leader, glorious be thy name... deliver us from evil", echoing the Lord's Prayer.

=== Post-war France ===
It has been said that Charles de Gaulle, leader of the Free French Forces during World War II and later Prime Minister and President, sought to create a cult of personality around himself based on "a unique theological-political language to explain his 'mission' as savior-leader of France." de Gaulle claimed that he embodied the "national legitimacy" of France from the formation of the French National Committee in 1940, and that he continued to embody it even in the years when he did not hold electoral office. These tendencies were criticized by liberal thinkers such as Raymond Aron and Jean-François Revel, and promoted by Gaullist intellectuals like André Malraux.

== Germany ==
=== Third Reich ===
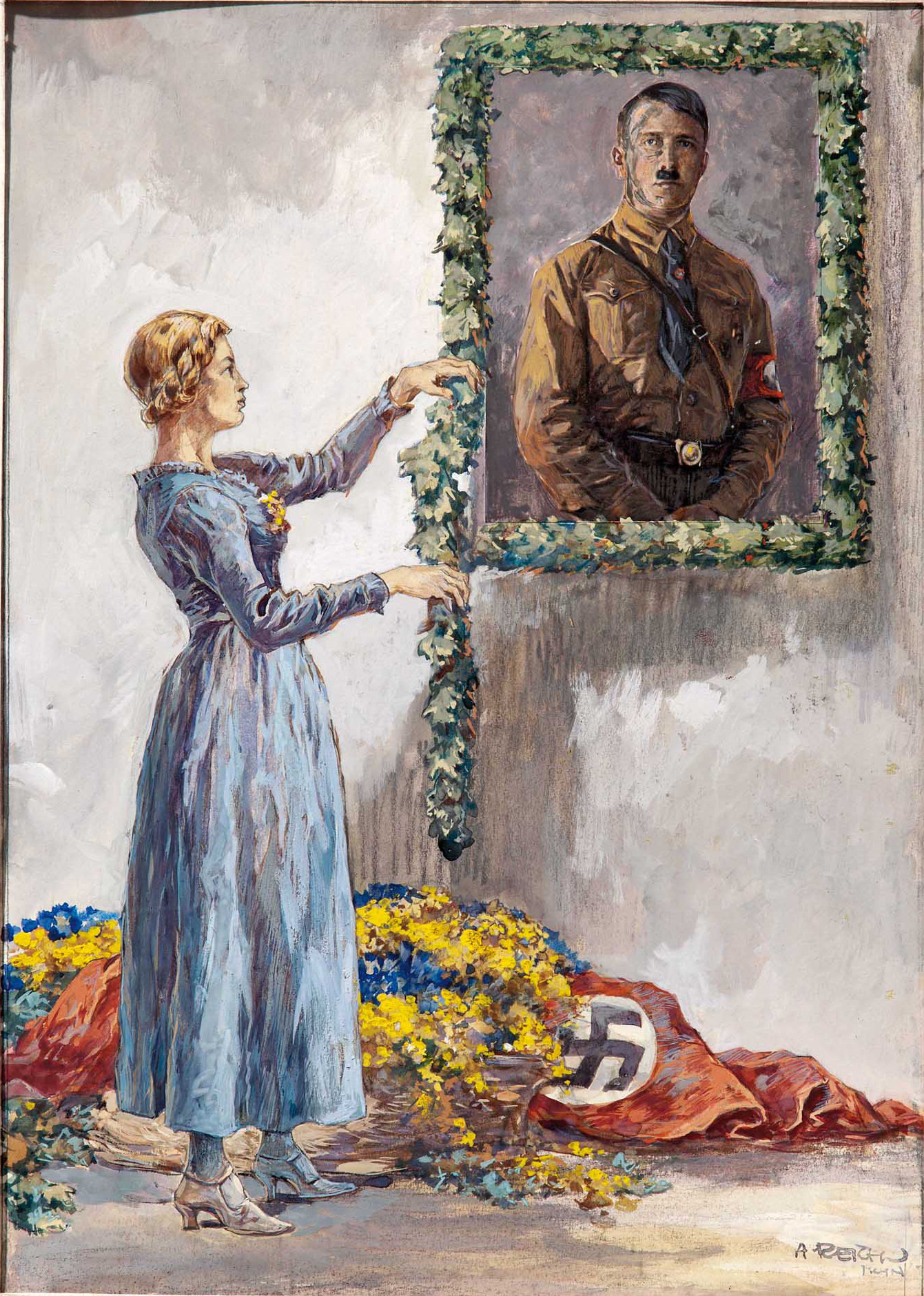
A portrait of Hitler by Albert Reich (1881–1942)

Adolf Hitler, Führer ("leader") of Nazi Germany, was referenced by Nazi propaganda in a number of honorary titles (Supreme Judge of the German People, First Soldier of the German Reich, First Worker of the New Germany, Greatest Military Commander of All Time, Military Leader of Europe, High Protector of the Holy Mountain, etc.). Numerous works in popular music and literature featured Adolf Hitler prominently. Hitler was usually depicted as a heroic, idolatrous figure, loved, feared and respected by the German people.

=== Post-war Germany ===
East Germany's first leader, Walter Ulbricht, was also subjected to a personality cult. People were arrested for mocking Ulbricht's goatee, which was seen by the East German government as a shorthand for him.

The first leader of the West Germany, Konrad Adenauer, has also been described as having a personality cult. In the first four years of his rule, he revived the traditional German personality cultism and became depicted as an "iron man" figure. While he maintained the essential trappings of liberal democracy, within the government and his rigidly disciplined party CDU his will was not challenged.

== Haiti ==
Dictator François Duvalier fostered a personality cult around himself and he claimed that he was the physical embodiment of the nation. He revived the traditions of vodou, later on exploiting them in order to consolidate his power by claiming that he himself was a houngan, or vodou priest. In an effort to make himself even more imposing, Duvalier deliberately modeled his image on that of Baron Samedi. The most celebrated image from the time shows a standing Jesus Christ with a hand on a seated Papa Doc's shoulder with the caption "I have chosen him". In 1986, the Haitian constitution outlawed Duvalier-type personality cults.

== Hungary ==
=== Horthyist period ===
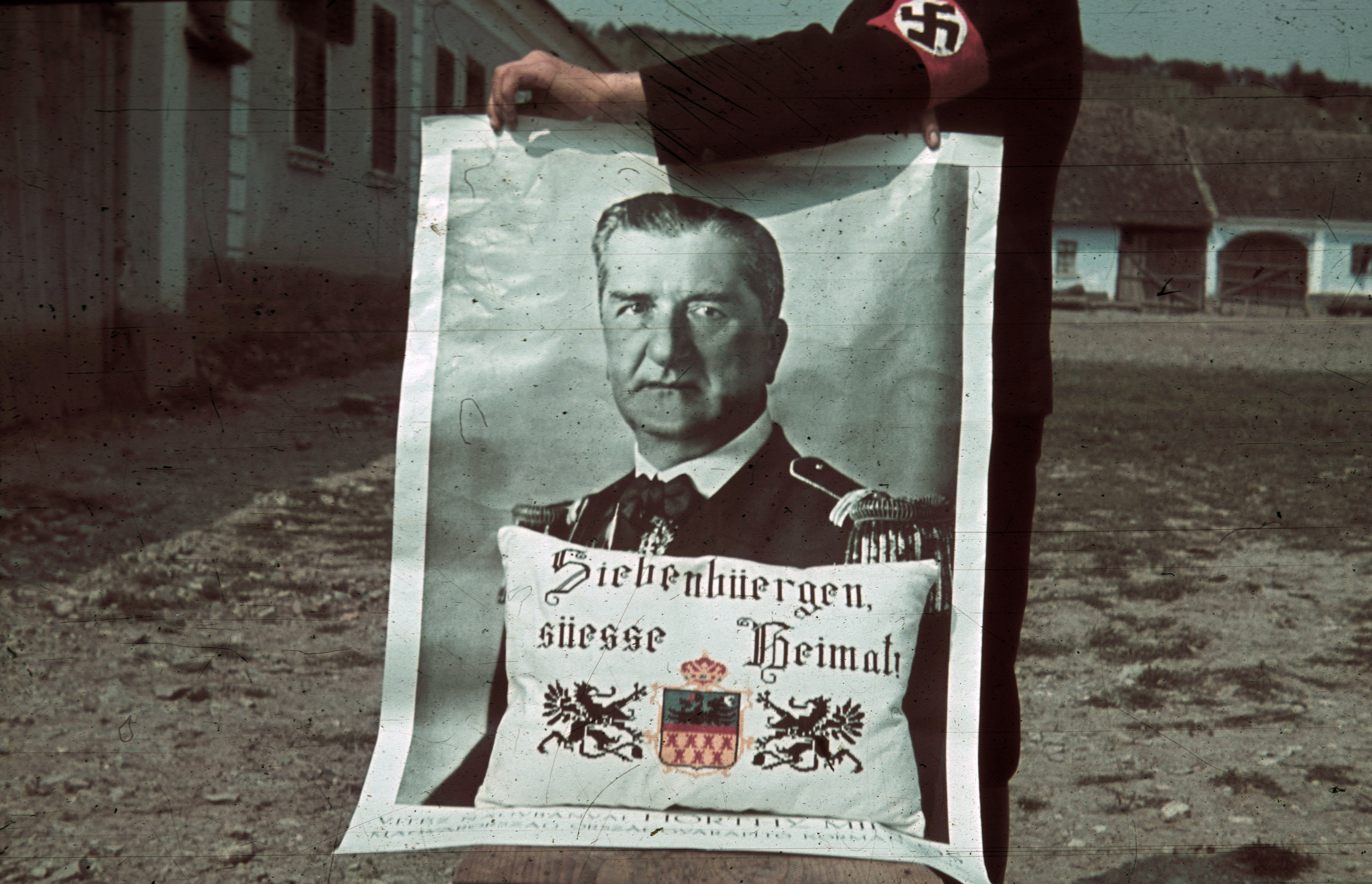
Nazi official with a portrait of Miklós Horthy, 1940

The cult of Miklós Horthy, who became the head of state of the Kingdom of Hungary after the dissolution of Austria-Hungary and a wave of counter-revolutionary terror after World War I, was one of the first personality cults to be established in interwar Europe. Horthy was presented as the only person capable of achieving the national goals and restoring the lost national glory. Horthy built the Hungarian national identity around Christianity, and in order to maintain his own cult, Horthy actively manipulated Christian symbols and concepts, namely resurrection, rebirth, salvation, the Passion of the Christ, selectness, the promised land, and references to the will of divine providence for justifying the Horthy's rule.

=== Stalinist period ===
Mátyás Rákosi, the leader of the Hungarian People's Republic, was surrounded by a cult of personality similar to that of Stalin. This peaked on his 60th birthday in 1952, which was commemorated with a series of nationwide celebrations. Many things were named after him, including:

- the Mátyás Rákosi Iron and Metal Works
- the Mátyás Rákosi Technical University of Heavy Industry
- Mátyásdomb, i.e. "Mátyás-Hill", a village founded in 1952
- Rákosi scholarship for college and university students
- National Rákosi Competition (for high school students, today: Országos Középiskolai Tanulmányi Verseny)
- Rákosi Medal for winners of the above-mentioned competition

After de-Stalinization, his name was dropped from all institutions in 1956.

== India ==
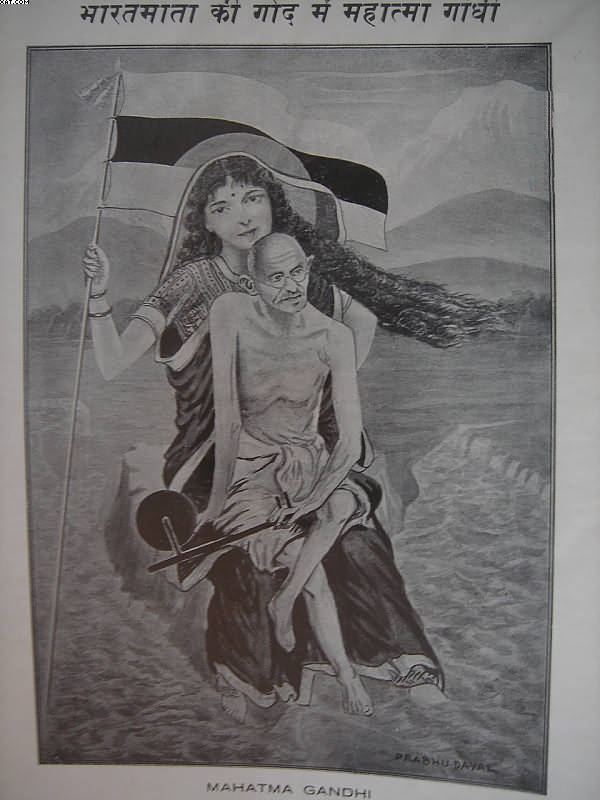
1940s print from North India showing Mahatma Gandhi as the son of Bharat Mata (lit. 'Mother India')

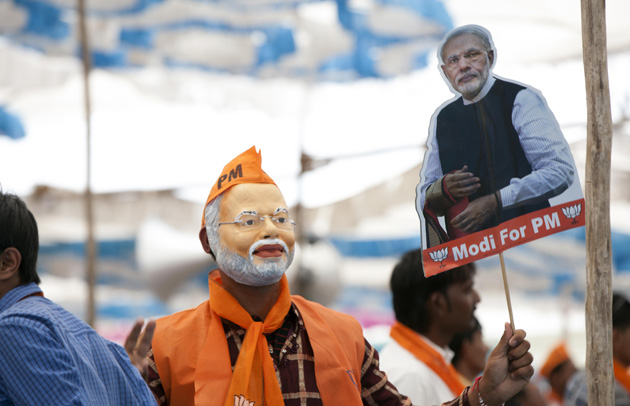
A supporter of Narendra Modi wearing a Modi mask during a political rally

During the days of the freedom struggle, Mahatma Gandhi had a cult-like following amongst the people of India. Congress leaders like Chittaranjan Das and Subhash Chandra Bose who opposed Gandhi's methods, found themselves sidelined within the party. The assassination of Gandhi in 1948 led to widespread violence against Marathi Brahmins by his followers. After Gandhi's death, his cult was eclipsed by another personality cult that had developed around India's first prime minister Jawaharlal Nehru. C Rajagopalachari criticized the personality cult surrounding Nehru, saying that there should be an opposition group within the Congress. Rajagopalachari later formed the economically right-wing Swatantra Party in opposition to Nehru's socialist economic view. The expression 'Nehruvian consensus' reflects the dominance of Nehruvian ideals, a product of Nehru's personality cult and the associated statism, i.e. the overarching faith in the state and the leadership. However, Nehru himself actively discouraged the creation of a cult of personality around him. He wrote an essay anonymously under the pen name 'Chanakya', titled 'Rashtrapati' in 1937 published in the Modern Review warning people about dictatorship and emphasizing the value of questioning leaders.

The Congress party has been accused of promoting a personality cult centered around Nehru, his daughter Indira Gandhi and the Nehru-Gandhi family. Indira Gandhi has also been described as having a cult of personality during her administration. Following India's victory in the 1971 Indo-Pak war, Gandhi was hailed by many as a manifestation of the Hindu goddess Durga. In that year, Gandhi nominated herself as a recipient for the Bharat Ratna, the highest civilian award of the country. During the Emergency period the then Congress party president Devakanta Barooah, had remarked "India is Indira, Indira is India". Her assassination in 1984 by her Sikh bodyguards sparked a massive wave of public grief and anti-Sikh violence. The Congress party led by her son Rajiv Gandhi utilised her death to win the general elections shortly held after. His assassination while campaigning in the 1991 general elections also led to widespread public grief, which was utilised by the Congress to win the elections despite unfavorable circumstances.

Current Indian Prime Minister Narendra Modi is often criticized for creating a personality cult around him. Despite some setbacks and criticism, Modi's charisma and popularity was a key factor that helped the Bharatiya Janata Party (BJP) return to power in the 2019 general elections. Shivraj Singh Chouhan, the chief minister of the country's second largest state, said in 2022, "He is superhuman and has traces of God in him." The Opposition often accused Modi for spreading propaganda using popular media such as movies, television and web series. Modi is often accused of having narcissist traits. In 2015, Modi wore a suit which has his name embroidered all over it in fine letters like a Hindu namavali (A sheet of cloth printed all over with the names of Hindu gods and goddesses usually worn by Hindu priests during puja) while greeting US president Barack Obama during his bilateral visit to India. This suit was auctioned that year, selling at a record amount of 43.1 million Indian rupees, thereby earning the Guinness World Records for the most expensive suit. In 2019, a biographical film of Modi was released, which was heavily criticized for its hagiographical nature. In 2021, Modi named the world's largest cricket stadium after himself. During the 2024 general elections, Modi tried to divinise himself in an interview, in which he stated that he viewed himself to be sent directly by God to serve a special purpose on Earth. BJP spokesperson Sambit Patra while campaigning in the Hindu holy city of Puri stated that even Jagannath (the form of the Hindu god Vishnu which is venerated there) worships Modi. The BJP is also stated to have created a cult of personality around Hindu Mahasabha leader V. D. Savarkar and Gandhi's assassin Nathuram Godse to oppose the dominance of Gandhian philosophy in Indian society.

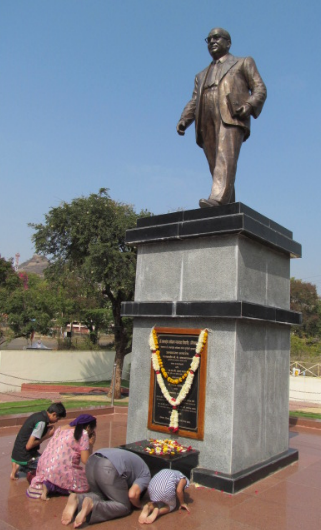
Citizens of India bow to the statues of B. R. Ambedkar in 2014.

One study claims that India's political culture since the decline of the Congress' single-handed dominance over national politics from the 1990s onwards as a fallout of the Ram Janmabhoomi movement and Mandal Commission protests has paved way for personality cults centered around leaders of the small regional parties, derived from hero-worship of sportspersons and film industry celebrities and the concept of bhakti, which in turn has fostered nepotism, cronyism and sycophancy. Among these leaders, Tamil Nadu Chief Minister J. Jayalalitha had one of the most extensive ones. She was widely referred by leaders and members of her party as Amma ('mother' in Tamil, also used to refer to Hindu goddesses) and would prostrate themselves before her. She would be regularly publicly applauded with Tamil titles like Makkalin Mudhalvar (people's chief minister), Puratchi Thalaivi (revolutionary female leader), Thanga Thalaivi (golden female leader) etc. by her cadres. Her government provided various kinds of subsidised goods under the brand name of Amma. Widespread violence broke out throughout the state when she was arrested on charges of corruption. A huge wave of public grief swept all over the state, with some even committing suicide, following her death in 2016. Another leader, Mayawati, was also known for attempting to foster a cult of personality during her tenure as the Chief Minister of India's most populous state by getting constructed large statues of herself and the elephant (which was the electoral symbol of her party) that were installed in public parks at the cost of government exchequer.

Historical personalities are also deified to the level of cult worship long after their lifetimes which is utilised by politicians to woo their followers for electoral purposes. Prominent examples are the cult of Shivaji in Maharashtra and the cult of Dr. B. R. Ambedkar among Dalits.

== Indonesia ==
There were extensive cults of personality surrounding Indonesia's founding leaders, Sukarno (1945-1966) and Suharto (1966-1998).

=== Sukarno (Guided Democracy) ===
During the Guided Democracy era, Sukarno developed a cult of personality. He was made "president for life" by the MPRS in 1963. His ideological writings on the 1959 Political Manifesto (Manipol-USDEK) and NASAKOM ("Nationalism, Religion and Communism") became mandatory subjects in Indonesian schools and universities, while his speeches were to be memorized and discussed by all students. All newspapers, the only radio station (RRI, government-run), and the only television station (TVRI, also government-run) were made into "tools of the revolution" and functioned to spread Sukarno's messages. Sukarno's cult extends to the capital of newly acquired West Irian renamed to Sukarnopura and the highest peak in the country was renamed from Carstensz Pyramid to Puntjak Sukarno (Sukarno Peak). The 1962 Asian Games Sports Complex was also renamed after him, as he was also the architect involved. He was featured in the obverse of some of the banknotes issued during his time in office.

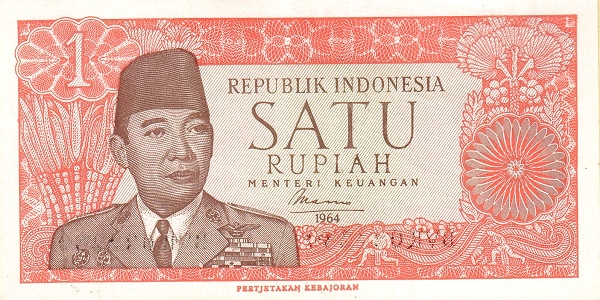
Sukarno's depiction in the 1964-issued 1 rupiah banknote

Sukarno was popularly referred to as bung ("comrade"), and he painted himself as a man of the people who carried the aspirations of Indonesia and dared to take on the West. Also, some other titles were given to him, like "Great Leader of the Revolution". When General Suharto gradually rose to power on March 11, 1966, Sukarno's cult, roles, and services were eradicated in a de-Sukarnoization policy.

=== Suharto (New Order) ===
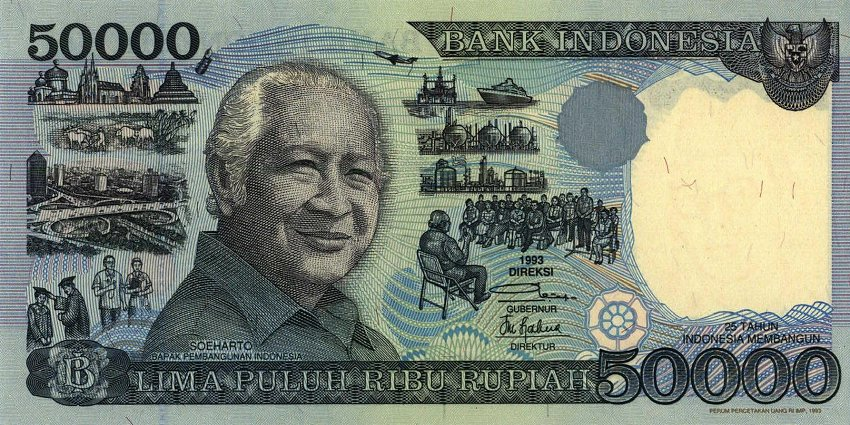
Suharto's depiction in the 1993-issued 50,000 rupiah banknote

The New Order government created a propaganda in which Suharto is depicted as the "hero" during the 1949 General Offensive, as well as during the September 30 coup attempt and its subsequent mass killings and unrests. He was also granted the title of bapak pembangunan ("father of development") in 1983. Several books praising him and his works were published during his 30 years of power, such as the 6-book series of "Jejak Langkah Pak Harto" (Mr. Harto's Footsteps) by Nazaruddin Sjamsuddin (1991), "The Smiling General: President Soeharto of Indonesia" by an unknown German named Otto Gustav Roeder (1969) – who was thought to be a former Schutzstaffel member and spy stationed in Indonesia named Rudolf Oebsger-Röder – and his autobiography entitled "Pikiran, Ucapan, dan Tindakan Saya" (My Thoughts, Remarks, and Actions, 1989).

In 1993, its central bank, Bank Indonesia, issued the first – and the then-highest valued – banknote of 50,000 rupiah. Its obverse pictured Suharto as the Father of Development and the slogan "25 Tahun Indonesia Membangun" (25 years of Indonesia's development), which dated back to his first term as president in 1968.

In September 1998, four months after the Suharto's resignation, Information Minister Yunus Yosfiah – who was formerly his closest ally – declared that the Treachery of G30S/PKI film would no longer be compulsory viewing material, reasoning that it was an attempt to manipulate history and create a cult within Suharto as the protagonist. In addition, the aforementioned sports complex name was restored in 2001.

In the present day, Suharto is still venerated and revered among the country's older demographic and conservative politicians. Furthermore, there were demands by some citizens and politicians to re-establish his policies as part of the "New Order revivalism", whom many considers beneficial.

== Iran ==
=== Pahlavi Iran ===
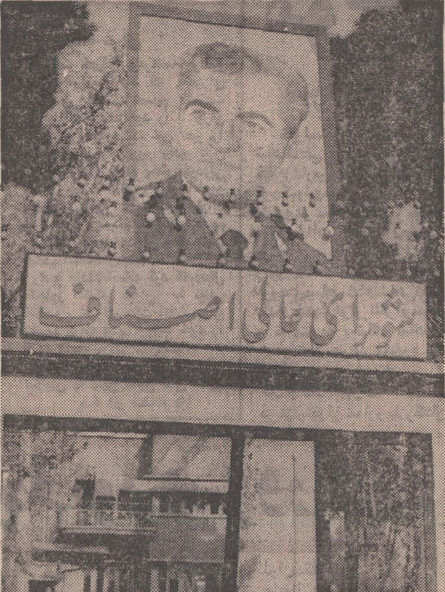
Public portrait of Mohammad Reza Pahlavi, 1971

A personality cult was formed around the Pahlavi dynasty which ruled Iran from 1925 to 1979, and in particular around Mohammad Reza Pahlavi, who ruled the country as Shah from 1941. One account of Iran in 1974, during the oil crisis, states: "Every front-page of every newspaper published in Iran was required to carry a picture of members of the imperial family accompanied by their latest appearances and achievements. A new portrait of His Imperial Majesty appeared in public buildings and private businesses that showed the Shahanshah 'standing on what appears to be on top of the world, waving, with clouds rolling by behind him.' […] Another portrait depicted the Shah and Shahbanou resembling movie stars Jeff Chandler and Sophia Loren." Asadollah Alam, Mohammad Reza Pahlavi's closest confidant who served as Minister of Royal Court from 1967 to 1977, is considered to have had an instrumental role in formenting the personality cult around the Shah.

=== Islamic Republic of Iran ===
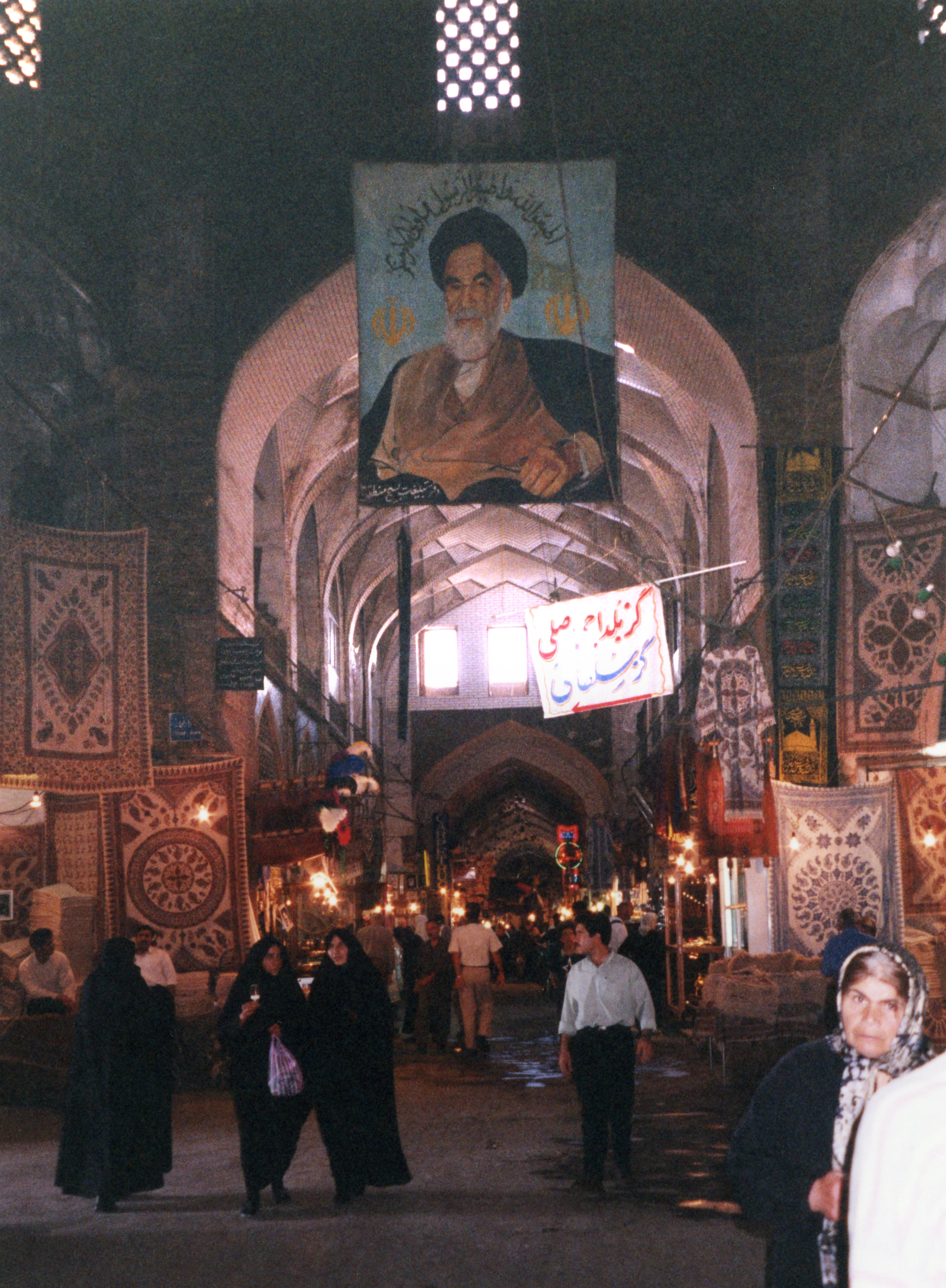
The bazaar under the portrait of Ruhollah Khomeini in Isfahan, Iran

Following the Iranian Revolution, a cult of personality developed around Supreme Leaders Ruhollah Khomeini and Ali Khamenei. This is most evident in the ubiquitous visual depictions of both men. According to Baqer Moin, as part of Khomeini's personality cult, he "had been transformed into a semi-divine figure. He was no longer a grand ayatollah and deputy of the Imam, one who represents the Hidden Imam, but simply 'The Imam'." Khomeini's personality cult fills a central position in foreign- and domestically targeted Iranian publications. The methods used to create his personality cult have been compared to those used by such figures as Joseph Stalin, Mao Zedong and Fidel Castro, and it was encouraged by Khomeini himself (which was negatively noted by his enemies inside Iran). Regarding Khamenei, Amir Taheri has written, "Like Khomeini before him, Khamenei is the object of a massive cult of personality. Official flatterers describe him as a "Divine Gift to Mankind" or as the "Shining Sun of the Imamate." In official discourse, he is quoted more often than either Prophet Muhammad or the Quran itself. Objects which he has touched during provincial visits are collected and sold as icons..."

There is a personality cult built around Qasem Soleimani, ever since his death. Portraits, banners and posters of Qasem Soleimani can be seen in Iran and in Iraq, usually coupled with Abu Mahdi al-Muhandis.

== Iraq ==
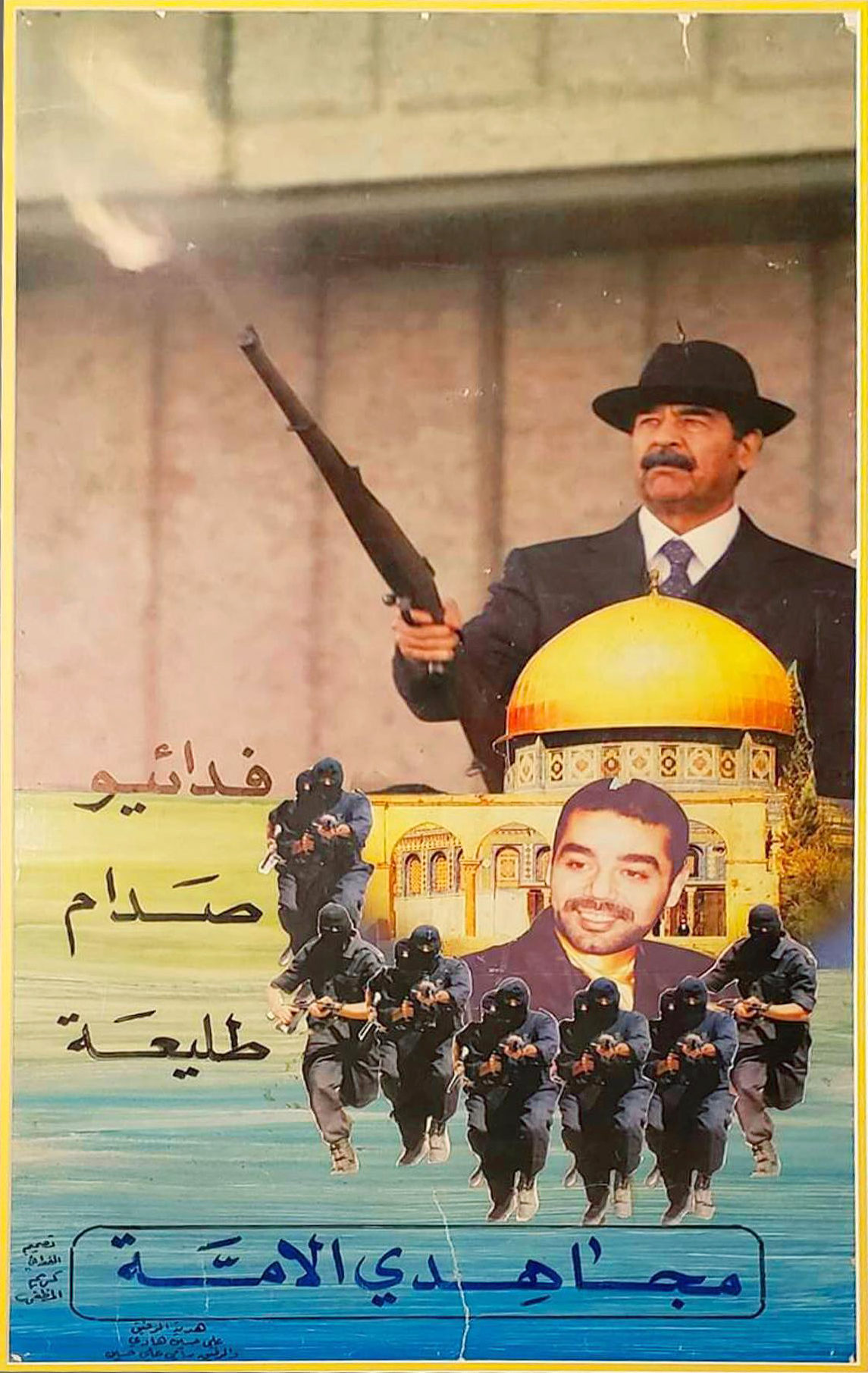
Propaganda poster for the recruitment of the Fedayeen Saddam

As a sign of his consolidation of power as Iraq's dictator, Saddam Hussein's personality cult pervaded Iraqi society. He had thousands of portraits, posters, statues and murals erected in his honor all over Iraq. His face could be seen on the sides of office buildings, schools and classrooms, airports, and shops, as well as on all denominations of Iraqi currency (the dinar). Saddam's personality cult reflected his efforts to appeal to the various elements in Iraqi society. This was seen in his variety of apparel: he appeared in the costumes of the Bedouin, the traditional clothes of the Iraqi peasant (which he essentially wore during his childhood), and even appeared in Kurdish clothing, but he also appeared in Western suits fitted by his favorite tailor, projecting the image of an urbane and modern leader. Sometimes he would also be portrayed as a devout Muslim, wearing a full headdress and robe, praying towards Mecca, but most often he was depicted wearing a military uniform.

An international airport, a university, a bridge, a dam, a stadium, an art centre, a street, an urban district (Saddam-city), a rocket and other objects were named after him. Saddam even had many well-decorated (by golden flush toilets) palaces for his own private use. People brought many gifts to Saddam that were collected in a special palace. According to his order, every tenth brick of reconstructed ancient buildings (including Nebuchadnezzar's palace) was marked with his name or signature. His biography and his literary works were required reading in schools and Ba'ath Party functioneers examined students' knowledge of them.

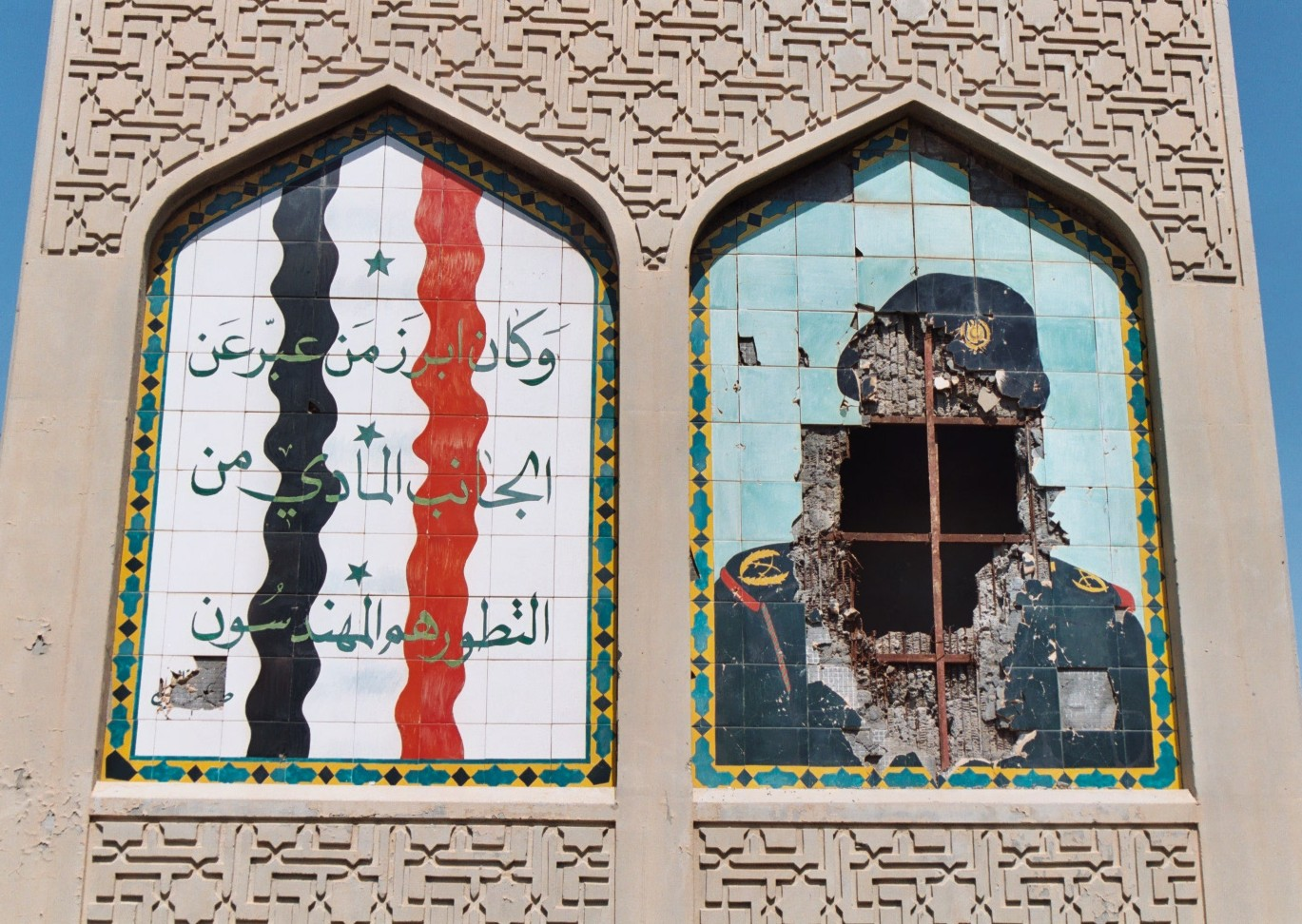
Saddam's portrayal destroyed by the Coalition forces in 2007

Many written songs, novels, scientific and propaganda articles were devoted to him. State television was broadcast with his image in the background and a mosque at the corner of the screen and it very often showed him, or his hands being kissed by children and other people.

After the fall of his regime, made visible by the toppling of his statue on Firdous Square in Baghdad on April 9, 2003, all statues of Saddam were destroyed. All other propaganda aspects of his cult were dismantled, following the US invasion of Iraq. After the fall of Saddam in 2003, personality cults of Moqtada Al-Sadr and Abu Mahdi al-Muhandis can be seen throughout Iraq, through posters and banners. Some of the posters also carry insignia of the Popular Mobilization Forces.

== Israel ==
Critics of Benjamin Netanyahu, the current and the longest-serving prime minister of Israel and leader of the opposition when not in power, and some observers, have described him as enjoying a personality cult. A study claims that Netanyahu has created popularity and maintained power by setting a narrative in which Iran was acquiring the capacity to annihilate Israel and "wreak havoc upon the Western world" and in which the Jews are again threatened by an antisemitic regime unless Israel leads a preventative response, while constructing a cult of personality and promising security to all Israelis, and thus, solidifying his support through an "orchestrated unity", which includes the ritual of the leader offering security in return for the people's exchange of gratitude. Isabel Kershner writes that Netanyahu's "most loyal base" "had built something of a personality cult around him", while the two main political blocks of Israel center on his personality and can be described as "Only Bibi" and "Anyone but Bibi". Critics which accused Netanyahu of a personality cult include the journalists Gershon Baskin and Pamela Peled of The Jerusalem Post.

== Italy ==
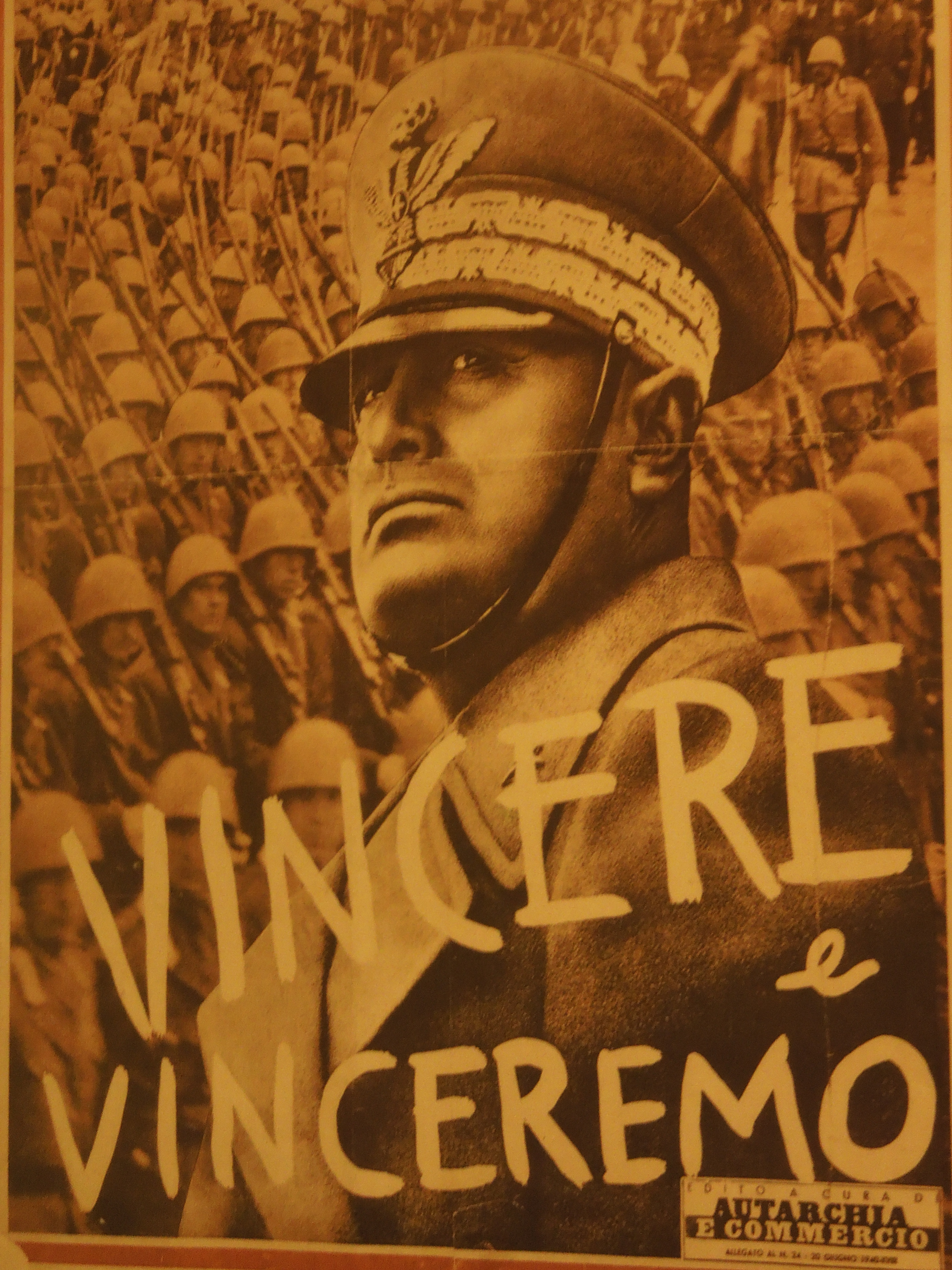
Benito Mussolini in a poster promoted by fascist propaganda with the motto: "Win and we shall win"

The personality cult of Benito Mussolini was in many respects the unifying force of the Fascist regime, acting as a common denominator for various political groups and social classes in both the fascist party and the wider Italian society. A basic slogan proclaimed that Mussolini was always right (Italian: Il Duce ha sempre ragione). Endless publicity revolved around him. He was generally portrayed in a macho manner, although he could also appear as a Renaissance man, a military man, a family man, or even as a common man. This reflected his presentation as a universal man, expert in all subjects; a light was left on his office long after he was asleep as a part of fascist propaganda in order to present him as an insomniac owing to his driven to work nature. Mussolini himself oversaw which photographs could appear, rejecting some, for instance, because he was not sufficiently prominent in a group. Legends of Mussolini defying death during the First World War and surviving assassination attempts were circulated in order to give the dictator a mythical, immortal aura. In addition to depicting Mussolini as being chosen by God, the regime presented him as having omnipotent, godlike or superhuman powers. His image proclaimed that he had improved the Italian people morally, materially, and spiritually. Even before his seizure of power, he was proclaimed the Duce in song. The war on Ethiopia was presented as a revival of the Roman Empire, with Mussolini as Augustus.

With the entry of media tycoon Silvio Berlusconi into Italian politics in the 1990s and 2000s, some critics claimed that a new kind of cult of personality was in place, favored by Berlusconi's three national television networks and newspapers. Moreover, the hymn of Berlusconi's movements Forza Italia and People of Freedom was Meno male che Silvio c'è, literally "Thank goodness for Silvio". In addition to that, Berlusconi often described himself as the Jesus Christ of Italian politics. These attitudes were seen by public opinion as clear examples of the new political style that Berlusconi brought into Italy, focused on the leader's charisma, cult of personality and media domination. Silvio Berlusconi was Prime Minister of Italy for three terms and four governments. He governed the country for a total of almost ten years (less than one year in 1994–1995; five years in 2001–2006; and three and a half years in 2008–2011).

== Japan ==
During the Second World War, the Japanese government maintained a cult of personality around Hirohito, continuing a trend of mythologizing the Japanese Emperors as of divine origin. However, this was ended after the Second World War and the Humanity Declaration of Hirohito.

A small cult of personality exists for the assassinated Prime Minister Shinzo Abe among some sectors of the Japanese right, seeing him as a martyr to the cause of Japanese nationalism. Many in the Japanese left and center criticized his memorial service as a form of cult of personality. A shrine dedicated to him is currently being constructed in Nagano prefecture.

Daisaku Ikeda, president of Soka Gakkai's international offshoot Soka Gakkai International, has been the frequent targets of criticism for fostering a cult of personality centered around himself.

== Kazakhstan ==
The former first President Nursultan Nazarbayev is the subject of a state sponsored personality cult in Kazakhstan, where he has assumed the title "Leader of the Nation". After the president's resignation, the Parliament of Kazakhstan voted to rename the capital, Astana, into Nur-Sultan as a 'tribute'. The city's previous name was restored in September 2022.

== South Korea ==
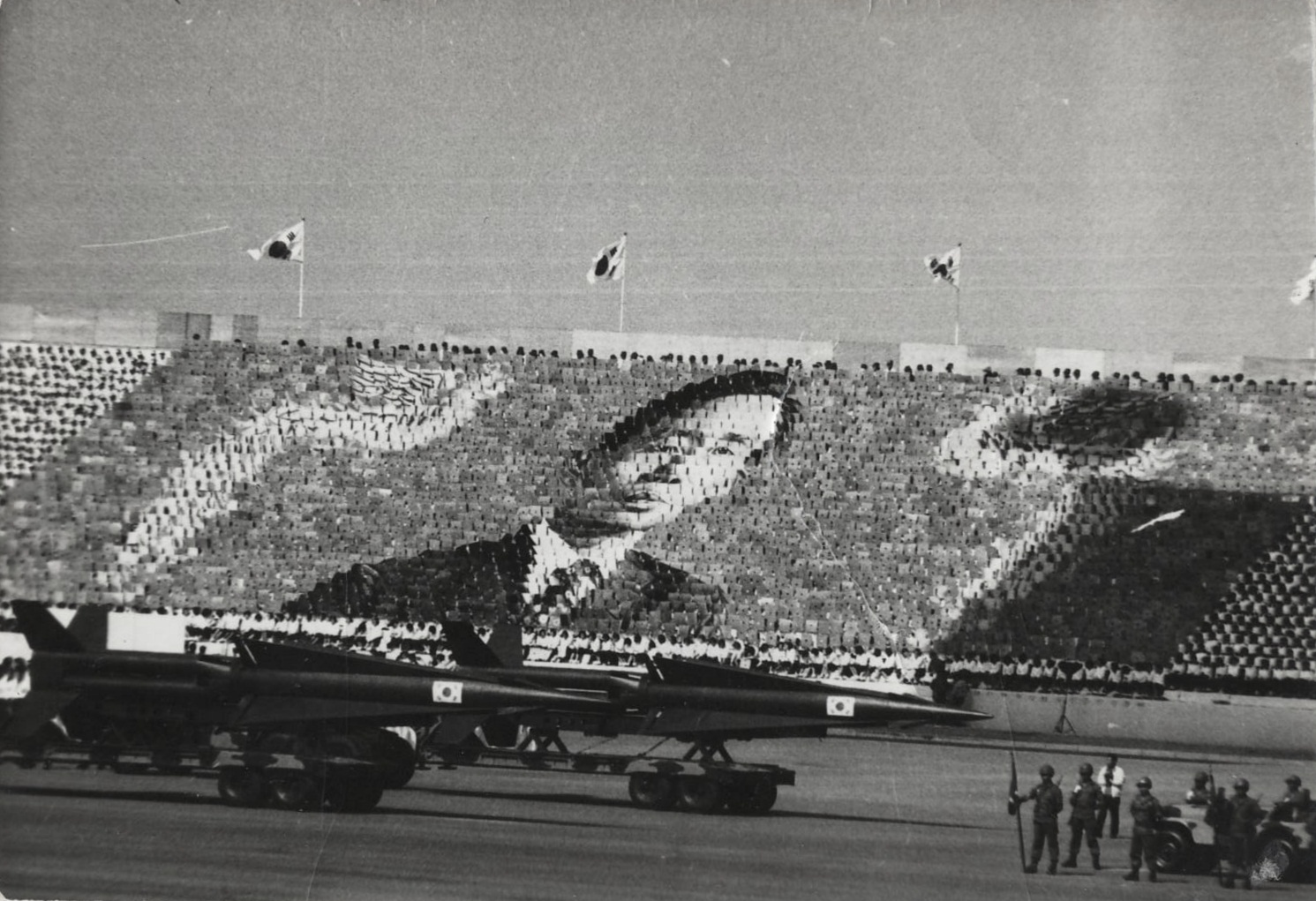
A huge card stunt depicting Park Chung Hee at a ROK Armed Forces Day parade in 1973

After taking power in a coup in 1961, President Park Chung Hee developed a personality cult of a type identical to his northern counterpart, with his image on posters and paintings that were displayed dynamically at marches and stadium gatherings. Many themes of Park's propaganda were very similar to those of North Korea, one example is being seen planting trees in a planting ceremony.

== North Korea ==
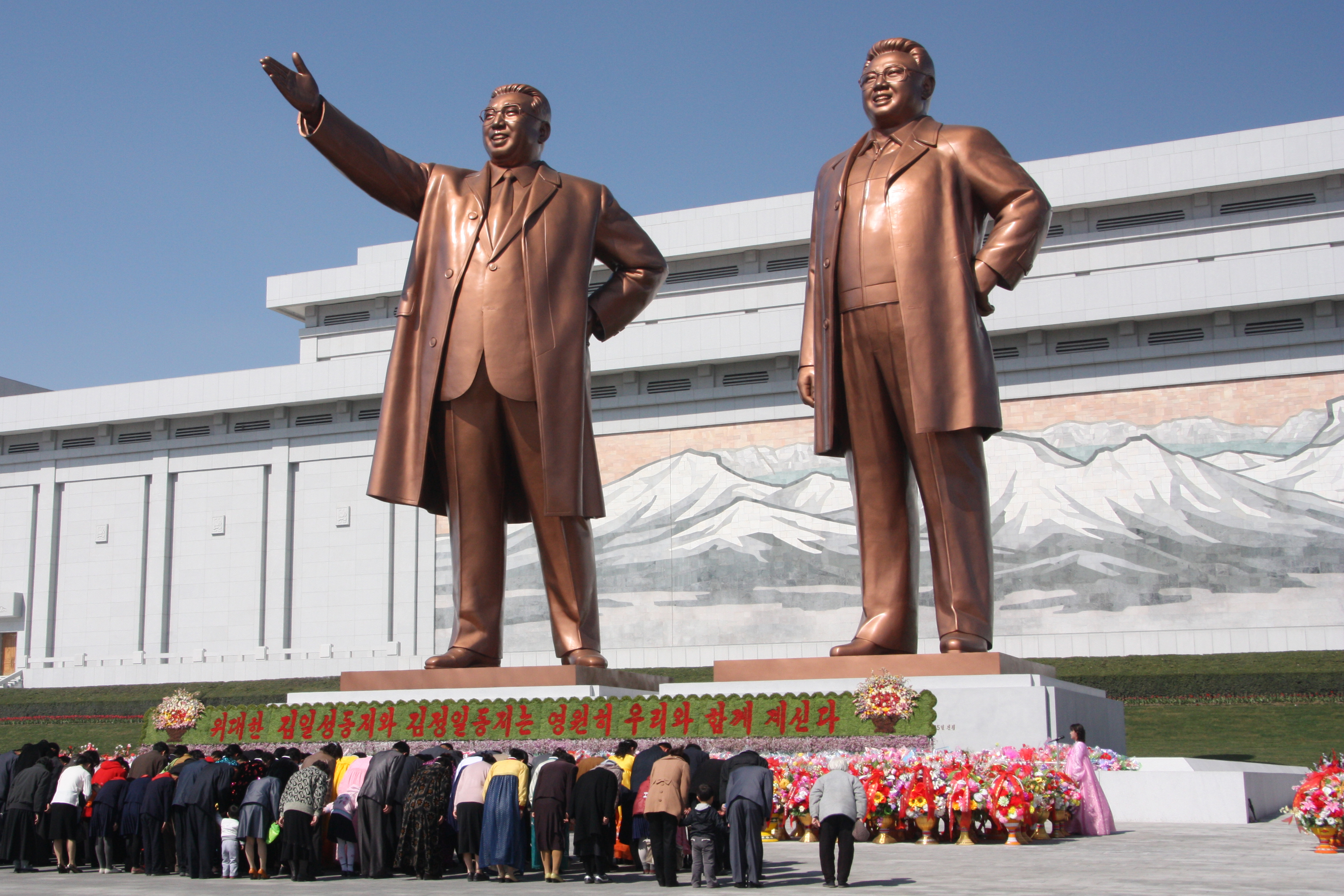
The statues of Kim Il Sung (d. 1994) and Kim Jong Il (d. 2011) at the Mansudae Grand Monument in Pyongyang

The peer-reviewed academic journal North Korean Review, published by the Institute for North Korean Studies at the University of Detroit Mercy in Detroit, Michigan, United States, reports that "Like his father Kim Jong-il during his lifetime, Kim Jong-un has so far avoided a cult of personality around himself that would include statues, street and place names, or images in pins or in apartments. He inherited, however, a few titles such as 'Great Sun of the 21st century,' 'Marshal,' or his father's title 'Great Leader' [widaehan ryŏngdoja]. The other 'Great Leader' [widaehan suryŏng] is still exclusively used for Kim Il-sung." [sic]

== Laos ==
A cult of personality is centered around the founders of the Lao People's Democratic Republic, Kaysone Phomvihane and the less prominent Prince Souphanouvong since their deaths in the early 1990s as there were no personality cults bestowed to them during their time in power. Kaysone's portrait is displayed on public government buildings as well as on Laotian kip bills. There is a museum built in Vientiane in order to honor Kaysone's life. Statues are also erected in his honor. Souphanouvong's name and face are also seen in memorials, museums, and statues all across Laos, with a university being named after him in Luang Prabang. Due to Souphanouvong's past position as only a figurehead president and leader of the communist Pathet Lao movement with Kaysone holding the real power over Laos, the display of Souphanouvong's personality cult are seen with much lesser prominence than Kaysone.

== Libya ==
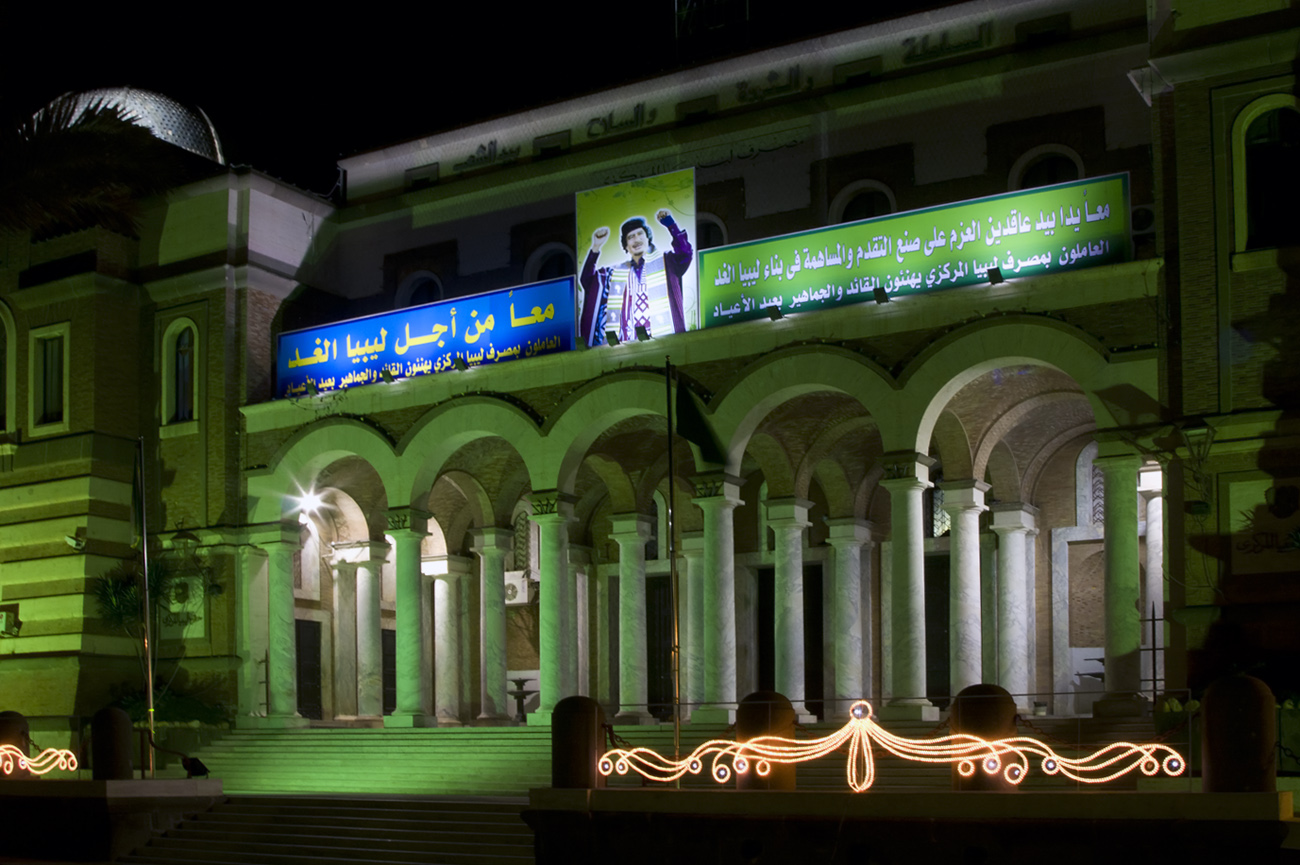
The Central Bank of Libya illuminated with an image of Gaddafi in 2009

A cult of personality devoted to Colonel Muammar Gaddafi existed in Libya during his rule. His face appeared on a wide variety of items, including postage stamps, watches, and school satchels. Quotations from The Green Book appeared on a wide variety of places, from street walls to airports and even on pens, and they were also put to pop music for public release.

Gaddafi claimed that he disliked the personality cult surrounding him, but he tolerated it because the Libyan people adored him. Biographers Blundy and Lycett believed that he was "a populist at heart". Throughout Libya, crowds of supporters would turn up to public events at which he appeared; described as "spontaneous demonstrations" by the government, there are recorded instances of groups being coerced or paid to attend.

He was typically late to public events, and he would sometimes not show up at all. Although Bianco thought that he had a "gift for oratory", he was considered a poor orator by biographers Blundy and Lycett. Biographer Daniel Kawczynski noted that Gaddafi was famous for his "lengthy, wandering" speeches, which typically involved criticizing Israel and the U.S.

== Malawi ==
A vast cult of personality was fostered around Hastings Banda, who ruled Malawi from independence in 1964 until 1994. Banda was referred to with numerous titles of praise, including some with religious connotations such as "Moses", "Messiah", and "Saviour". In 1971 Banda was declared President for Life, with his official title becoming "His Excellency the Life President of the Republic of Malawi, Ngwazi Dr. H. Kamuzu Banda"; the title ngwazi means "chief of chiefs" or "great lion" in Chichewa. His birthday was declared a public holiday, "Kamuzu Day". Although many expressions of the cult around Banda were removed after his ouster in 1994, it was reported in 2009 that a revival was happening: a grandiose mausoleum had been built for his remains, monuments to him were being erected, the main airport and biggest stadium were named after him, and Kamuzu Day was reinstated as a public holiday.

== Mongolia ==
An example of the very few socialist cults of personality to emerge outside of the Soviet Union prior to the end of World War II is the posthumous cult in the Mongolian People's Republic around Damdin Sükhbaatar, who founded the Mongolian People's Revolutionary Party (MPRP) and led the Mongolian Revolution of 1921, and the cult of his successor Khorloogiin Choibalsan from the end of the 1930s, who largely copied the policies and leadership style of Joseph Stalin. Statues of Choibalsan were omnipresent, and a city continues to carry his name. After Choibalsan's death in 1952 his legacy began to be reevaluated – a development similar to de-Stalinization in the Soviet Union – and in January 1962 a resolution of the MPRP's Central Committee condemned the personality cult around him.

== Panama ==
The personality cult of Manuel Noriega developed during his rule as the de facto leader of Panama between 1983 and 1989. Although less elaborate than the highly institutionalized personality cults of leaders such as Joseph Stalin or Kim Il Sung, it centered on the glorification of Noriega as the embodiment of Panamanian nationalism and the defender of the country's sovereignty during its confrontation with the United States.

Noriega cultivated a personalized public image under the sobriquet El Man, a nickname closely associated with his leadership and public persona. Official propaganda increasingly portrayed him as the indispensable leader of Panama, while his image appeared on portraits and murals displayed in public spaces alongside nationalist slogans.

Public demonstrations and official ceremonies frequently celebrated Noriega personally. His birthday was commemorated with rallies and public festivities, with contemporary photographs showing him greeting supporters during his 1988 birthday celebration. As political tensions with the United States intensified during the late 1980s, the regime increasingly relied on nationalist rhetoric and personalized propaganda portraying Noriega as the nation's defender against foreign intervention.

== Paraguay ==
A strong cult of personality was developed around Alfredo Stroessner, who ruled Paraguay as military dictator from 1954 to 1989. Despite his personality being described as "singularly uncharismatic," Stroessner's name was given to towns (such as Ciudad del Este, which was renamed Puerto Presidente Stroessner) and public buildings, his portrait was on display in public offices, and an annual pilgrimage to the presidential palace was made by his supporters on his birthday (3 November).

Both the role of the armed forces and Stroessner's party, the Colorado Party, were emphasized in the cult; Stroessner was portrayed as a natural successor to the nationalist military leader Francisco Solano López, while also being referred to as the "segundo reconstructor", with Colorado Party founder and former president Bernardino Caballero, who was credited with reestablishing the war-torn economy after the Paraguayan War, being the "primer reconstructor." In a similar way, Stroessner was deemed to have guaranteed political peace and economic progress after the inflation and political instability that followed the Paraguayan Civil War of 1947.

== Peru ==
Fujimorism is the political ideology of former Peruvian president Alberto Fujimori as well as the personality cult built around him, his policies and his family, especially Keiko Fujimori. Fujimori was elected president in the 1990 election. He then led the 1992 Peruvian self-coup, ostensibly directed against domestic terrorists. Following the 1992 crisis, Fujimori would broaden the definition of terrorism in an effort to criminalize as many actions as possible to persecute left-wing political opponents. Using the terruqueo, a fearmongering tactic that was used to accuse opponents of terrorism, Fujimori established a cult of personality by portraying himself as a hero and made left-wing ideologies an eternal enemy in Peru.

Following Fujimori's fall from power, his self-exile to Japan, his extradition back to Peru and his subsequent trial and imprisonment, there emerged political parties that continued to proclaim to follow the legacy of Alberto Fujimori. The most prominent of these groups that formed in the aftermath of Alberto's downfall is Popular Force (Fuerza Popular), a political party that was created and is led by the former president's daughter Keiko Fujimori, a presidential candidate in 2011 and again in 2016. During the 2021 Peruvian general election, the right-wing elite, business groups and the majority of media organizations in Peru collaborated with the campaign of Keiko Fujimori by appealing to fear when discussing political opponents. Media organizations in Peru would use the terruqueo along with fake news in an effort to support Keiko Fujimori. Keiko Fujimori was elected Peru's president in 2026.

Abimael Guzman, the leader of the Peruvian Shining Path, also had an extensive cult of personality foisted on himself during the group's insurgency against the Peruvian state. He was seen by his supporters as the natural successor to Mao Zedong for hardline Maoist thought, and is viewed as an infallible Communist theoretician and guerrilla leader.

== Philippines ==
In the Philippines, many local politicians engage in some sort of cult of personality. The most famous are those of President Ferdinand Marcos, who was dictator from 1965 to 1986 and the Aquino family. They are often branded as "epalitiko" by the media, which is a contraction of the words epal (slang for "attention-grabber"), and pulítiko ("politician"). They put their images and their names on billboards of government projects. They also print tarpaulins, usually with their images in order to establish a sense of connection with their constituents. Senate Bill No. 1967 or Anti-Signage of Public Works Act, colloquially known as the Anti-Epal Bill, was filed by Senator Miriam Defensor Santiago in November 2011, and refiled again in July 2013 in an effort to stop the practice.

The 16th president, Rodrigo Duterte, is accused of creating a cult of personality on himself, with some supporters believing "he was appointed by God".

== Poland ==
=== Second Polish Republic ===
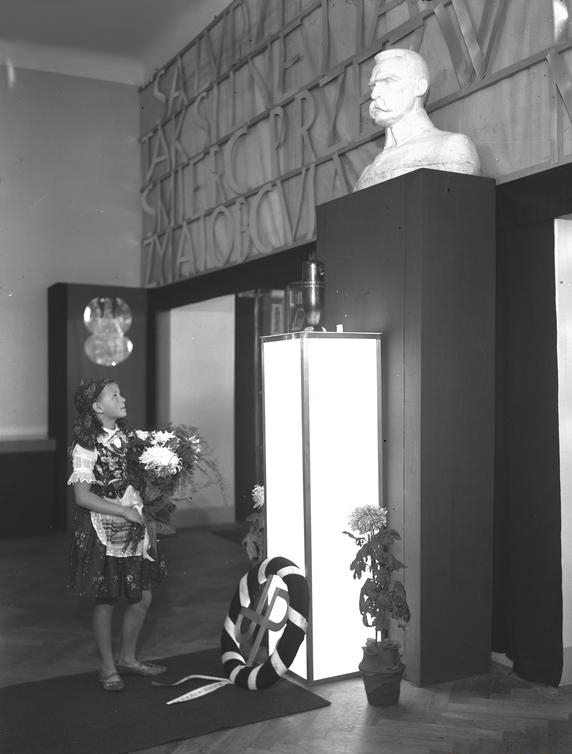
A girl reciting a poem in front of Piłsudski's bust

A cult of personality developed in Poland around the figure of Józef Piłsudski, the military commander who served as de facto leader (1926–1935) of the Second Republic, starting during the interwar period and continuing after his death in 1935 until the present day. During the interwar period, Piłsudski's personality cult was propagated by the state media, which described him as a masterful strategist and a political visionary, and associated him with his role in regaining Polish independence in the aftermath of World War I, and his leadership in the ensuing Polish–Soviet War. Piłsudski's successor Edward Śmigły-Rydz also began to develop his own cult of personality during the last years of the Second Republic.

=== Polish People's Republic ===
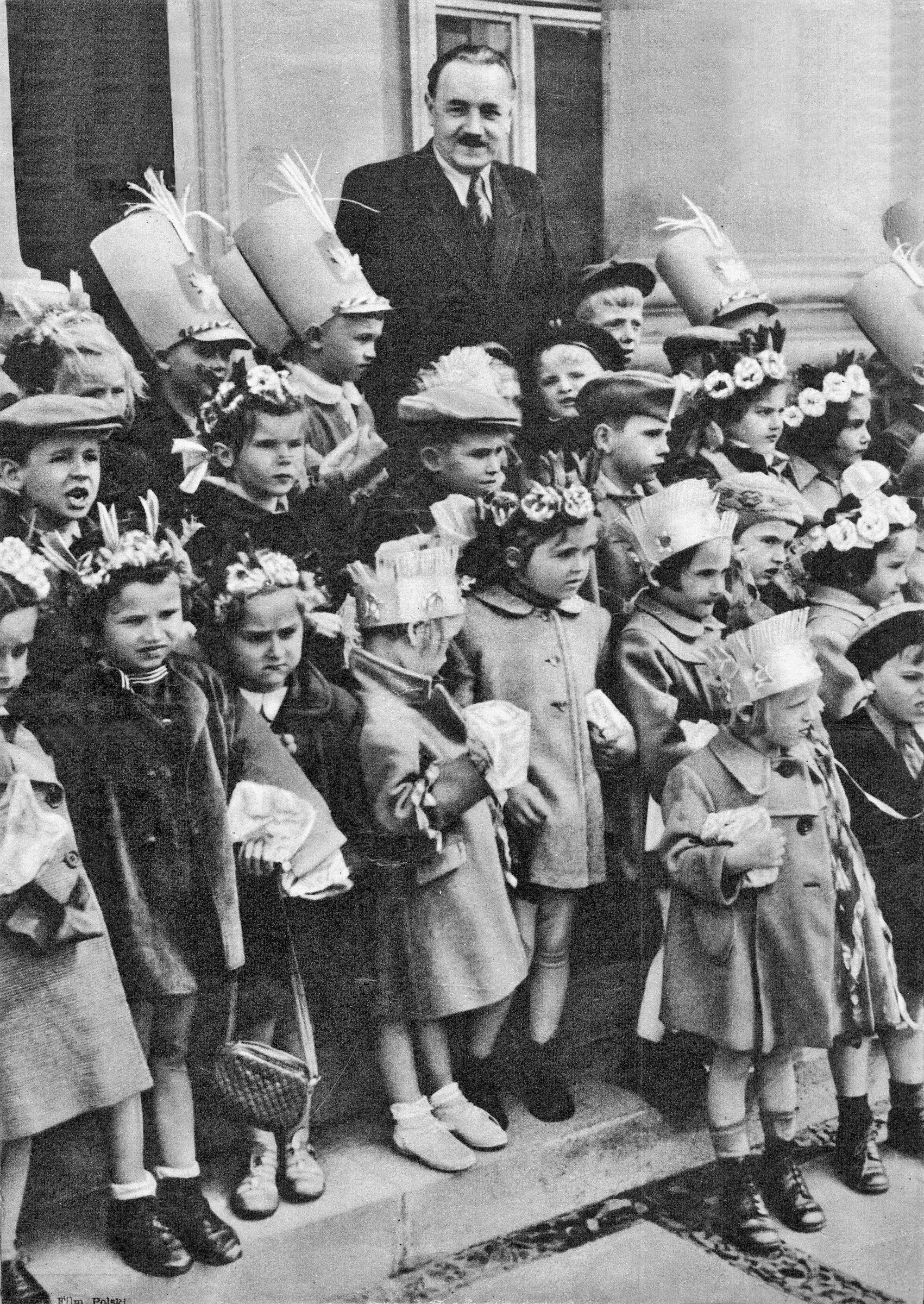
As part of his personality cult, Bolesław Bierut was often photographed surrounded by children.

In the post-war Polish People's Republic, cults of personality were formed around Bolesław Bierut, the General Secretary of the ruling Polish United Workers' Party and President of the country until his death in 1956, as well as around Soviet leader Joseph Stalin. Portraits of the two were often published next to each other in the press, with Bierut being described as "the first and most faithful pupil of Stalin in Poland." The culmination of the cult around Bierut can be dated to the first half of 1952, when his 60th birthday concurred with the fifth anniversary of his election as president, as well as the adoption of a new constitution. Bierut was praised for his achievements in the press, and from 4 March, daily updates were published about new commitments undertaken by workers to honor him. For his birthday a special anthology of poetry, featuring panegyrics by 14 well-known Polish authors, as well as a book for young readers, were published; two factories – a truck factory in Lublin and the Częstochowa steelworks – were named after him, as was the University of Wrocław.

In official discourse Bierut was referred to by a variety of titles, such as "the First Citizen and Host of the State", "the Teacher of the working masses", "the Helmsman of the Polish nation" and "the Fighter for the happiness of the Polish people." The different roles attributed to his persona was reflected in the various ways he was publicly addressed: among students and pupils he was called "the teacher and caretaker" or "great friend of children and youth", with propaganda photographs often showing him surrounded by children; among mine-workers he was dubbed "the friend of miners", and artists referred to him as "the caretaker of Polish culture".

=== Modern-day Poland ===
Piłsudski's cult has survived decades of repression, particularly during the era of communist rule. In modern Poland, Piłsudski is recognized as an important and largely positive figure in Polish history. Polish Independence Day is commemorated on November 11, the date when Piłsudski assumed power in Poland after the First World War.

Pope John Paul II is the namesake of numerous statues, museums, streets, universities, etc., and at least one reporter has been prosecuted for offending his persona in print.

== Portugal ==
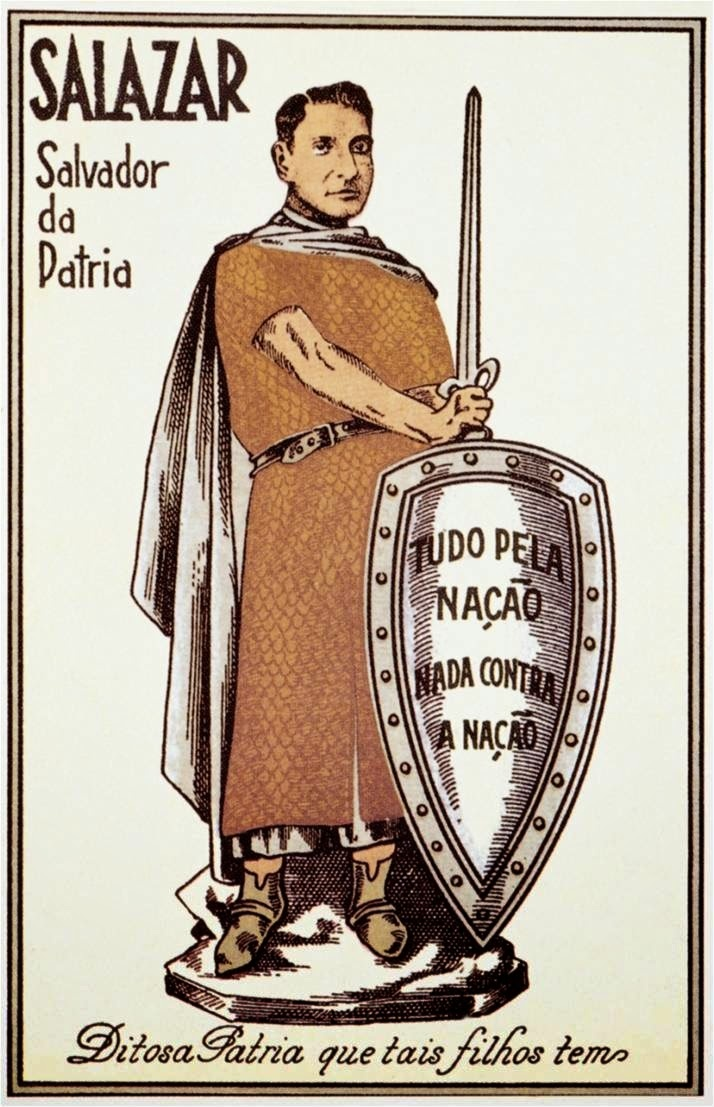
A propaganda poster depicting the dictator António de Oliveira Salazar as Afonso I of Portugal. The motto says "Everything for the nation, nothing against the nation".

During the Estado Novo regime, but mainly at its beginning, there was a significant effort by the state to promote António de Oliveira Salazar as a national hero who saved the country from political and financial instability, with him often getting compared to other historical figures of Portugal. Sometimes called "chefe" (chief), propaganda posters and photographs glorifying not only Salazar but also Óscar Carmona were commonly placed in public buildings such as schools and police stations. In schools, it was also common for books to have direct references to Salazar and his status as protector and savior of the nation, such as the famous "A Lição de Salazar" (The Lesson of Salazar), printed and distributed in Portuguese schools in 1938 with the purpose of promoting the values of the National Union party and the work carried out by Salazar up to that point. The government also used cinema (which was at that time a relatively new and growing phenomenon in Portugal) to further glorify Salazar but also to spread anti-communist and the apology of corporatism, thus causing cinematographic propaganda to be spread throughout the country on classic Portuguese films such as "O Pátio das Cantigas" (The Courtyard of Songs).

Some infrastructures inaugurated or restructured during the regime were named or renamed after the dictator, such as the 25 de Abril Bridge (formerly called Salazar Bridge, not to be confused with the Salazar Bridge built in 1935 in Santa Comba Dão) and the Josina Machel Secondary School (formerly called Salazar National Liceu), the latter also having a statue of the dictator at its main entrance. The Portuguese coin of 20 escudos had represented in itself the Salazar Bridge and Óscar Carmona had several stamps and angolar currency notes printed with his image in circulation in Angola.

== Romania ==
=== Kingdom of Romania ===
King of Romania, Carol II, also had a cult of personality during his rule.

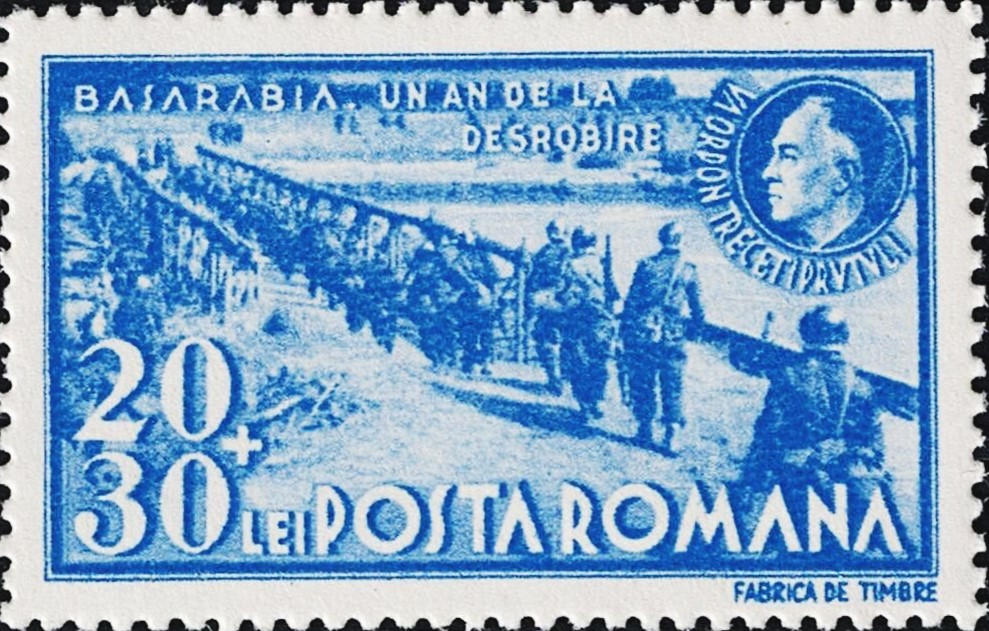
1942 post stamp featuring Ion Antonescu

Ion Antonescu, the Axis-aligned dictator of Romania during World War II who rose to power in 1940 with a coup orchestrated by him and the Fascist party Iron Guard and headed a fascist-like system, was also subjected to a personality cult. Antonescu had been identified with the "ideals of the Romanian people to the total fusion... truly [representing] the soul of the Romanian nation" and "eminent man with noble principles" and "iron will", "just, honest, a remarkable creator, capable of a penetrating comprehension of history", the founder of a new epoch.

=== Socialist Republic of Romania ===
In 1986 The New York Times reporter, David Binder stated that Romanian dictator Nicolae Ceaușescu presided over "a cult of personality that has equaled, or even surpassed, those of Stalin's Russia, Mao's China and Tito's Yugoslavia." Inspired by the personality cult surrounding Kim Il Sung in North Korea, it started with the 1971 July Theses which reversed the liberalization of the 1960s and imposed a strict nationalist ideology. Initially, the cult of personality was only focused on Ceaușescu himself; however, by the early 1980s, his wife Elena was also a focus of the cult even to the extent that she got credit for scientific achievements which she could never have accomplished. It remained in force until the overthrow of the regime in 1989 and the couple's execution.

Another Romanian communist ruler, Gheorghe Gheorghiu-Dej, also had a personality cult.

== Russia ==
=== Soviet era ===
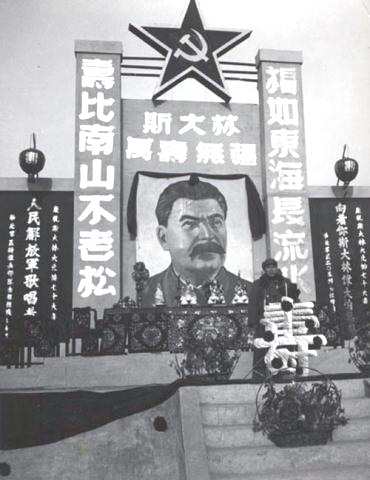
Chinese communists celebrate Joseph Stalin's 70th birthday, 1949.

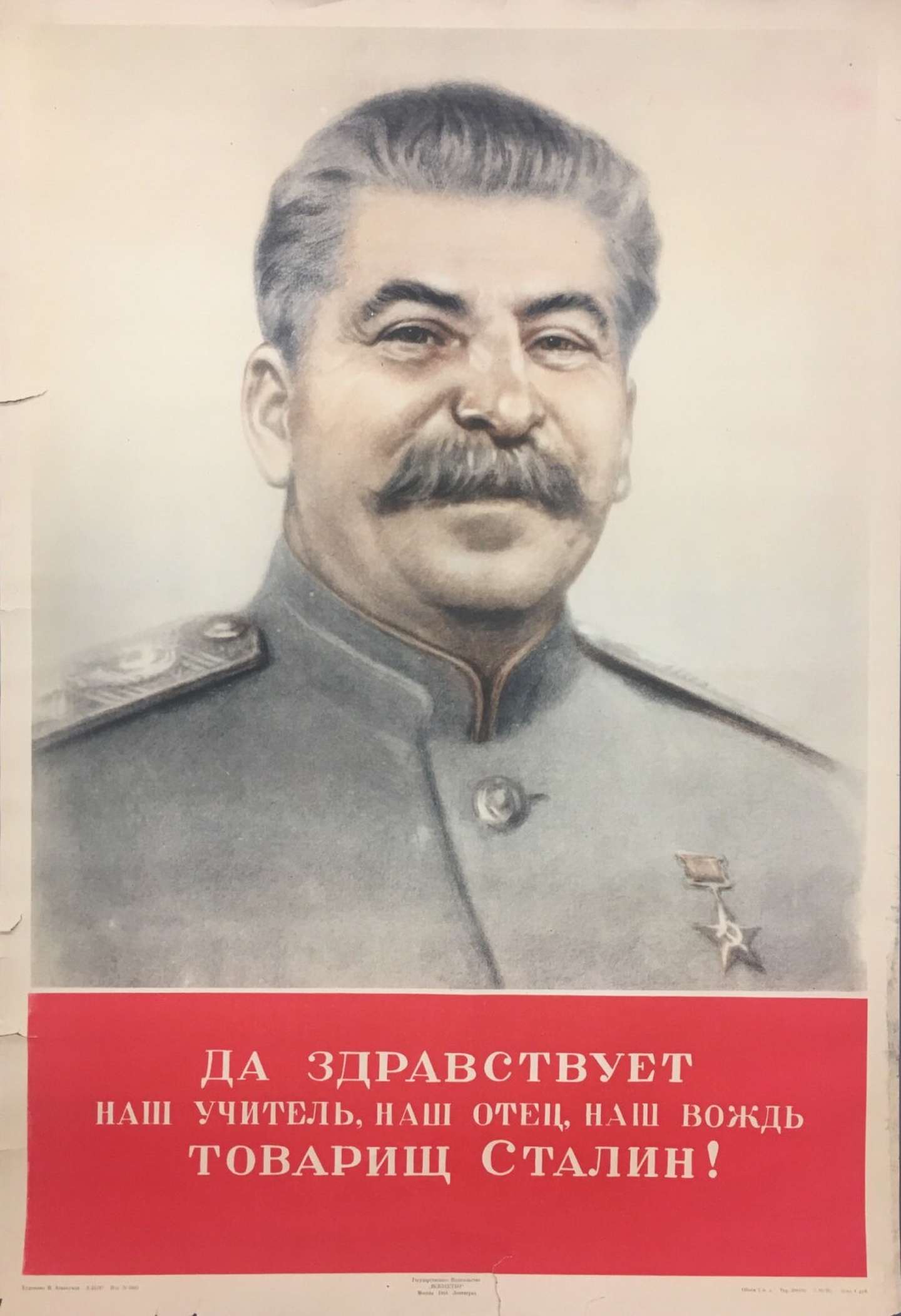
"Long live our teacher, our father, our leader, Comrade Stalin!" (1946 poster, Soviet Union). Stalin was the leader about whom the expression "cult of personality" was devised in 1956 by Nikita Khrushchev.

Nikita Khrushchev recalled Karl Marx's criticism in his 1956 "Secret Speech" denouncing Joseph Stalin and his cult of personality to the 20th Party Congress:

Comrades, the cult of the individual acquired such monstrous size chiefly because Stalin himself, using all conceivable methods, supported the glorification of his own person.... One of the most characteristic examples of Stalin's self-glorification and of his lack of even elementary modesty is the edition of his Short Biography, which was published in 1948.

This book is an expression of the most dissolute flattery, an example of making a man into a godhead, of transforming him into an infallible sage, "the greatest leader", "sublime strategist of all times and nations". Finally no other words could be found with which to lift Stalin up to the heavens.

We need not give here examples of the loathsome adulation filling this book. All we need to add is that they all were approved and edited by Stalin personally and some of them were added in his own handwriting to the draft text of the book.

Some authors (e.g., Alexander Zinovyev) have argued that Leonid Brezhnev's rule was also characterized by a cult of personality, though unlike Stalin, Brezhnev did not initiate large-scale persecutions in the country. One of the aspects of Leonid Brezhnev's cult of personality was his obsession with titles, rewards and decorations, leading to his inflated decoration with medals, orders and so on. This was often ridiculed by the ordinary people and led to the creation of many political jokes.

=== Modern Russia ===
Some journalists and Russian oppositionists argue that there is now a cult of personality around Vladimir Putin. As of 2011, one-fourth of the Russian population believes that a cult of personality reminiscent of Soviet Union-era leaders has developed around Putin, while another thirty percent believed that there were increasing signs of a personality cult surrounding Putin. Evidence of this includes food products named after him. Other evidence of Putin's personality cult includes the existence of the Army of Putin, his own female fan club as well as his involvement in action man publicity stunts. According to the United States Government-funded Radio Free Europe, in December 2015, a Russian youth group by the name of "Network" published a book titled "World-Changing Words: Key quotes of Vladimir Putin", which has been compared to Mao Zedong's Little Red Book.

The Head of the Chechen Republic, Ramzan Kadyrov has also been likened to possessing an extensive cult of personality. According to The New Yorker columnist Joshua Yaffa, media in Chechnya supplies heavy coverage to their leader, including "plenty of stories of citizens appealing to Kadyrov through messages on Instagram, and in many cases Kadyrov himself would show up the next day to fix some small problem or cajole an incompetent official into action." Kadyrov's father Akhmad has also been subject to lavish attention, and in 2021 his book A Path Bathed in Light was made required reading for Chechen highschoolers. Ramzan ordered dozens of images of superheroes in 2020 to be removed, on the grounds that "there are many real heroes from whom you can and should take an example, otherwise children think that only these heroes exist," and had them replaced with pictures of his father. Then-Chechen President Alu Alkhanov criticized Kadyrov in 2007 for growing a personality cult. Kadyrov denied all such allegations in an interview with Radio Free Europe/Radio Liberty.

== Rwanda ==
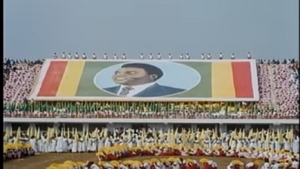
Juvénal Habyarimana ruled Rwanda as a totalitarian Hutu Power military dictator for more than 20 years from a coup in 1973 to his subsequent murder in 1994.

Juvénal Habyarimana cultivated a significant cult of personality during his authoritarian rule in Rwanda from 1973 to 1994. His regime, a de facto totalitarian one-party military dictatorship under the Mouvement révolutionnaire nationale pour le développement (MRND), actively promoted an idealized image of Habyarimana, requiring citizens to participate in public displays of adulation through chanting, dancing, and rallies. This cult was bolstered by strict control over media and information, including state-wide censorship and the use of newspapers and radios, such as Kangura and Radio Télévision Libre des Mille Collines (RTLM) as a government propaganda tool, inciting hatred towards the Tutsi minority and Hutu opponents. Habyarimana's ideology, presented as "peasant-friendly," reinforced his image as a leader dedicated to the rural Hutu majority, while simultaneously suppressing dissent and eliminating rivals through political arrests and violence. This powerful cult of personality helped to solidify Habyarimana's hold on power and served as a foundation for the tragic events of the Rwandan genocide.

== Serbia ==
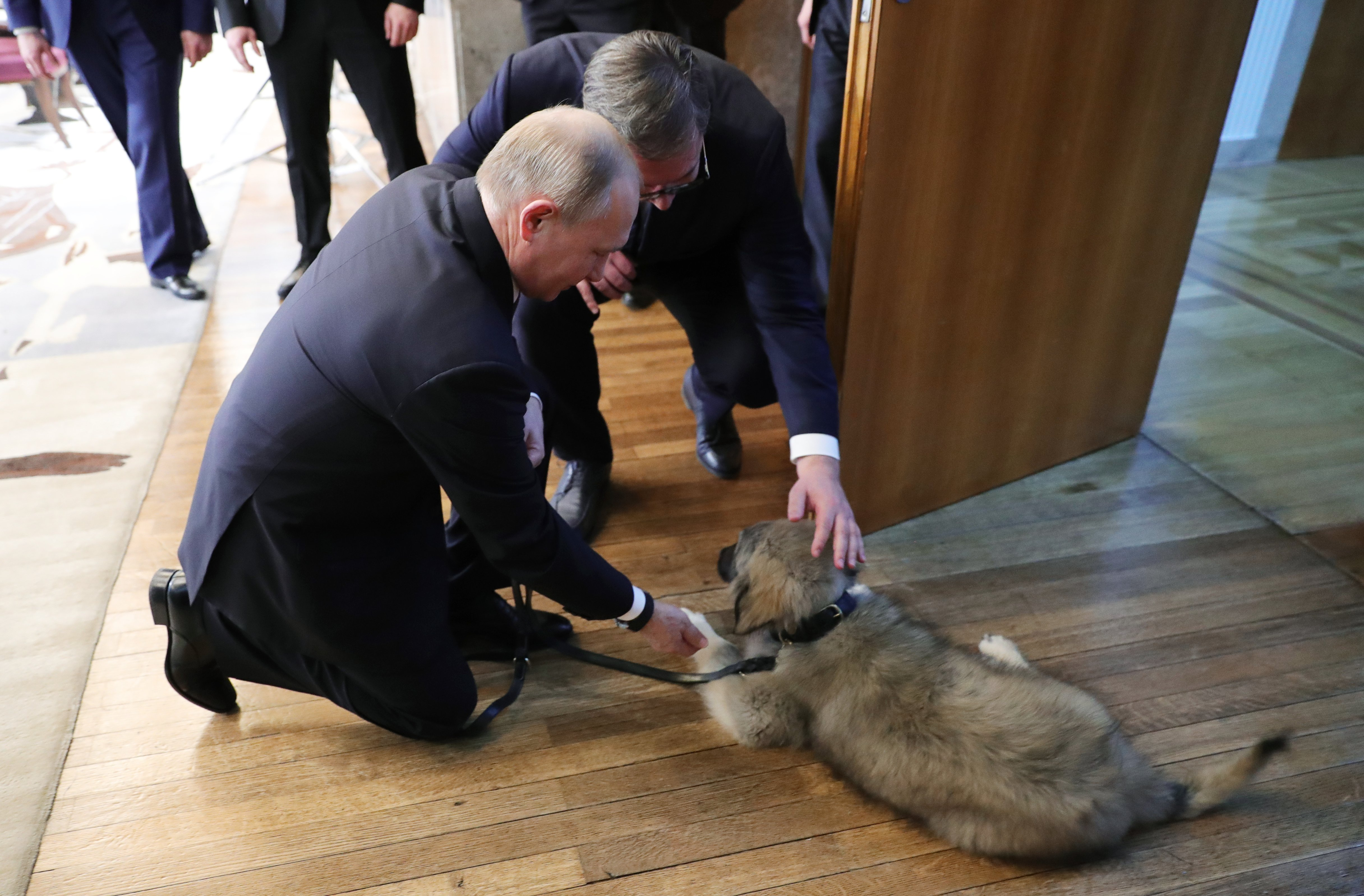
Serbian president Aleksandar Vučić petting a dog with Vladimir Putin, president of Russia. Pro-government media in Serbia most often presents Vučić as a powerful person under constant attack, who receives messages of support from Putin.

Some observers have described that Aleksandar Vučić built a cult of personality during his authoritarian rule as prime minister and as president. After Vučić's inauguration as the president of Serbia, he appointed Ana Brnabić as his successor as prime minister. Shortly afterwards, Brnabić suggested that portraits of Vućić be placed in all state institutions “to strengthen the cult of the state”, which was supported by some ministers. According to investigative journalism portal Crime and Corruption Reporting Network, more than 700 fake news were published on the front pages of pro-government tabloids during 2018. Many of them were about alleged attacks on Vučić and attempts of coups, as well as messages of support to him by Vladimir Putin. In 2020, Twitter announced that it shut down a network of 8,500 spam accounts that wrote 43 million tweets – acted in concert to cheerlead for Vučić and his party, boost Vučić-aligned content and attack his opponents. Some athletes and sports officials praised Vučić for own success, even giving him their own medals.

In the last days of the campaign before the 2017 presidential election, he was a guest with his parents on a program on Happy TV, in which he offered assistance in front of the camera to a man who allegedly fainted. Parliamentary leader of the governing Serbian Progressive Party, Zoran Babić, declared during the session that he admires the Vučić physically and mentally, stating that he was impressed that Vučić had not left the hall for hours to go to the toilet. Director of the Institute for Health Protection of Mother and Child of Serbia stated that the children patients and parents were more smiling and cheerful than ever because of the president's visit. After Vučić was hospitalized for cardiovascular problems in November 2019, ministers, party colleagues and local party committees wrote announcements and organized support groups, while his associates and pro-regime media accused the journalists of worsening the president's health by asking “inappropriate” questions about alleged corruption by government ministers.

== Somalia ==
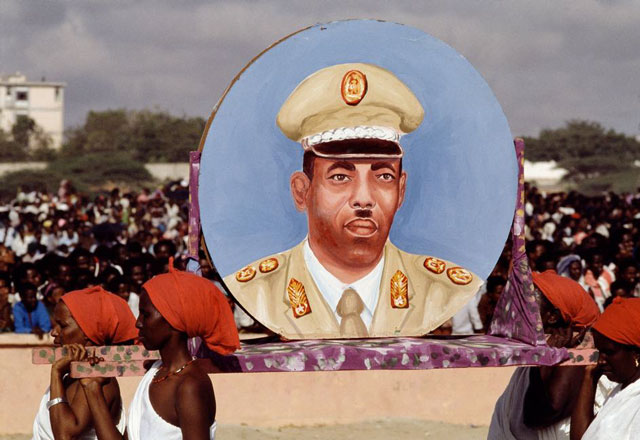
Portrait of Siad Barre during a parade at the anniversary of the 1969 coup that brought Barre to power, c. 1977

The growth of a personality cult was fostered around Siad Barre, who ruled Somalia as president and dictator between 1969 and 1991, as a means to replace the complex clan hierarchies of Somali society. Barre was styled the "Victorious Leader" (Guulwade) in official discourse; the traditional term of polite address ina'adeer, which means "cousin", was replaced by the non-kinship term jaalle, meaning "comrade" or "friend", and Barre was commonly referred to as "jaalle Siad Barre", or simply "jaalle Siad". Portraits of Barre along with Karl Marx and Vladimir Lenin were displayed in the streets for public occasions. A selection of his quotations were published and widely distributed in Barre's little blue-and-white book, reminiscent of Mao's Little Red Book in China.

== South Africa ==
A cult of personality was formed around Apartheid-era prime minister Hendrik Verwoerd. After his death, the town of Lyttelton was renamed to Verwoerdburg. Following the end of the apartheid the city was renamed to Centurion and most monuments to Verwoerd were destroyed or moved to Afrikaner only settlements.

Former president Jacob Zuma has been accused of forming a cult of personality around himself.

== Spain ==
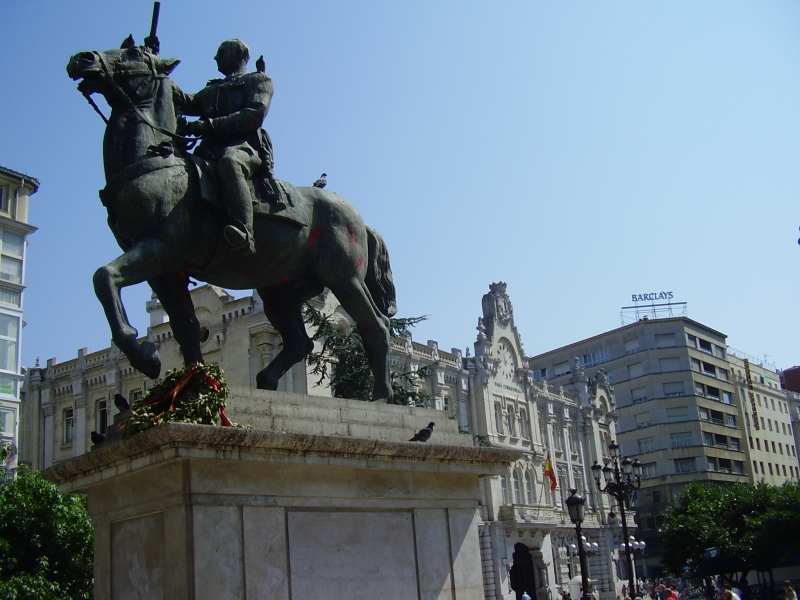
Equestrian statue of generalissimo Francisco Franco in the Plaza del Ayuntamiento (City Hall Plaza) of Santander, taken down in late 2008

A cult of personality surrounded Francisco Franco during his regime. From the mid-1940s onward, after he proclaimed Spain a monarchy with himself as regent for life, he was depicted much like a king. He wore the uniform of a captain general (a rank traditionally reserved for the king) and resided in the royal Pardo Palace. He appropriated the kingly privilege of walking beneath a canopy, and his portrait appeared on most Spanish coins. Indeed, although his formal titles were Jefe del Estado (Head of State) and Generalísimo de los Ejércitos Españoles (Generalissimo of the Spanish Armed Forces), he was referred to as Caudillo de España por la gracia de Dios, (By the Grace of God, the Leader of Spain). Por la Gracia de Dios is a technical, legal formulation which states sovereign dignity in absolute monarchies, and it had only been used by monarchs before Franco used it himself.

For almost four decades, schoolchildren were taught that Franco had been sent by Divine Providence to save Spain from chaos, atheism and poverty.

== Sri Lanka ==
Mahinda Rajapaksa has been accused of creating a cult of personality around himself, using the civil war victory and Sinhala chauvinism. He was referred as a "King" by some of his supporters, and he used the media to portray himself as a strong man. During his time in power, his pictures were shown on buses, billboards, and all forms of media. Television ads where songs were sung by school children in his rallies would hail him as "our father" and "father of the country". Rajapaksa also printed his picture on currency and named the budget airline Mihin Lanka after himself. Rajapaksa thought having his name in the sky would bring him good fortune. By 2022 the popularity of the Rajapaksas had declined and during the 2022 Sri Lankan Protests protesters named him "Myna" as an insulting nickname and demanded his resignation alongside the entire Rajapaksa family.

Mattala Rajapaksa International Airport, Magampura Mahinda Rajapaksa Port, Nelum Pokuna Mahinda Rajapaksa Theatre, and Mahinda Rajapaksa International Stadium were all high-profile lavish infrastructure projects initiated by Rajapaksa during his administration and named for him. Thus, critics have accused Rajapaksa of being narcissistic.

== Syria ==
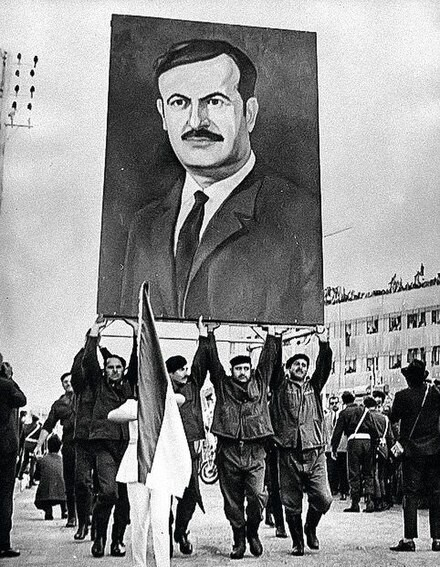
Syrians marching with giantic portrait of the Syrian president Hafez al-Assad

As one of his strategies to maintain power over Syria, Hafez al-Assad developed a state-sponsored cult of personality. Portraits of him, often depicting him engaging in heroic activities, were placed in every public space. He named myriad numbers of places and institutions in Syria after himself and other members of his family, such as Lake Assad, an artificial reservoir filled during his time in office. In school, children were taught to sing songs of adulation for Assad. Teachers would begin each school day with the slogan "Our eternal leader, Hafez al-Assad". The personality cult that he developed portrayed him as a wise, modest and just leader of the country. This strategy of creating a cult of personality was continued by Hafez's son, Bashar al-Assad, until his overthrow in 2024.

After the fall of the Assad regime, various statues of the al-Assad family were destroyed in which become known as the "de-Assadization".

== Tajikistan ==
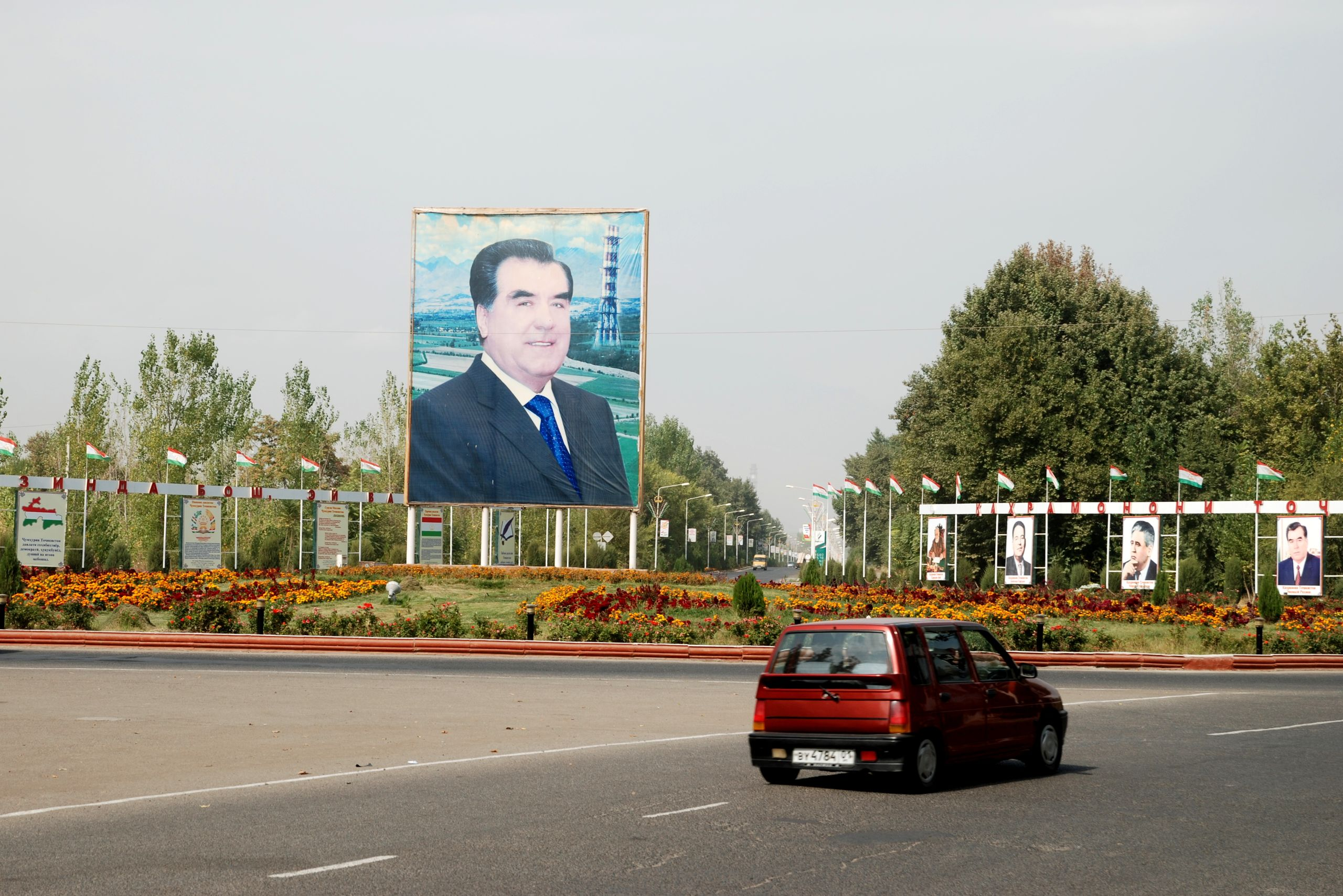
A portrait of Rahmon in Tursunzoda, Tajikistan

Long-serving ruler of Tajikistan Emomali Rahmon was a center of a personality cult, in which state media and educational materials portray him as the "Father of the Nation", credited with leading Tajikistan out from chaos toward a bright future. His portraits are displayed in most places in the country and songs have even been made for him such as "You are Worthy". A law was passed in December 2015, giving Rahmon titles as the "Founder of Peace and National Unity" and "Leader of the Nation" (peshvoi millat), along with immunity from all forms of prosecution.

== Thailand ==
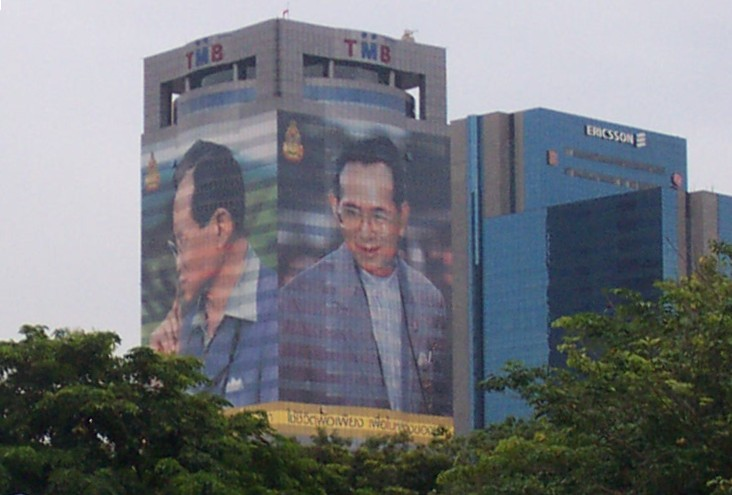
An image of the TMB Bank office building in Bangkok in 2006, adorned with a portrait of King Bhumibol Adulyadej

All members of Thailand's royal family, past and present, are officially venerated in a personality cult, especially beginning with King Bhumibol Adulyadej's ascension to the throne. Huge portraits of Bhumibol and his son and successor King Maha Vajiralongkorn, and other members of the royal family are disseminated throughout the country. The royal family is protected by lèse-majesté laws which allow critics to be jailed for three to fifteen years.

== Togo ==
President Gnassingbé Eyadéma had a personality cult of titanic proportions, including, but not limited to, an entourage of one thousand dancing women who sang and danced in praise of him; schoolchildren beginning their day by singing his praises; portraits which adorned most stores; a bronze statue in the capital Lomé; $20 wristwatches with his portrait, which disappeared and re-appeared every fifteen seconds; and even a comic book that depicted him as a superhero and budai with powers of invulnerability and superhuman strength. In addition, the date of a failed attempt on Eyadéma's life was annually commemorated as "the Feast of Victory Over Forces of Evil." Eyadéma even changed his first name from Étienne to Gnassingbé to note the date of the 1974 plane crash of which he was claimed to be the only survivor. A 2018 study found that "Gnassingbé Eyadema's rule rested on repression, patronage, and a bizarre leadership cult."

== Tunisia ==
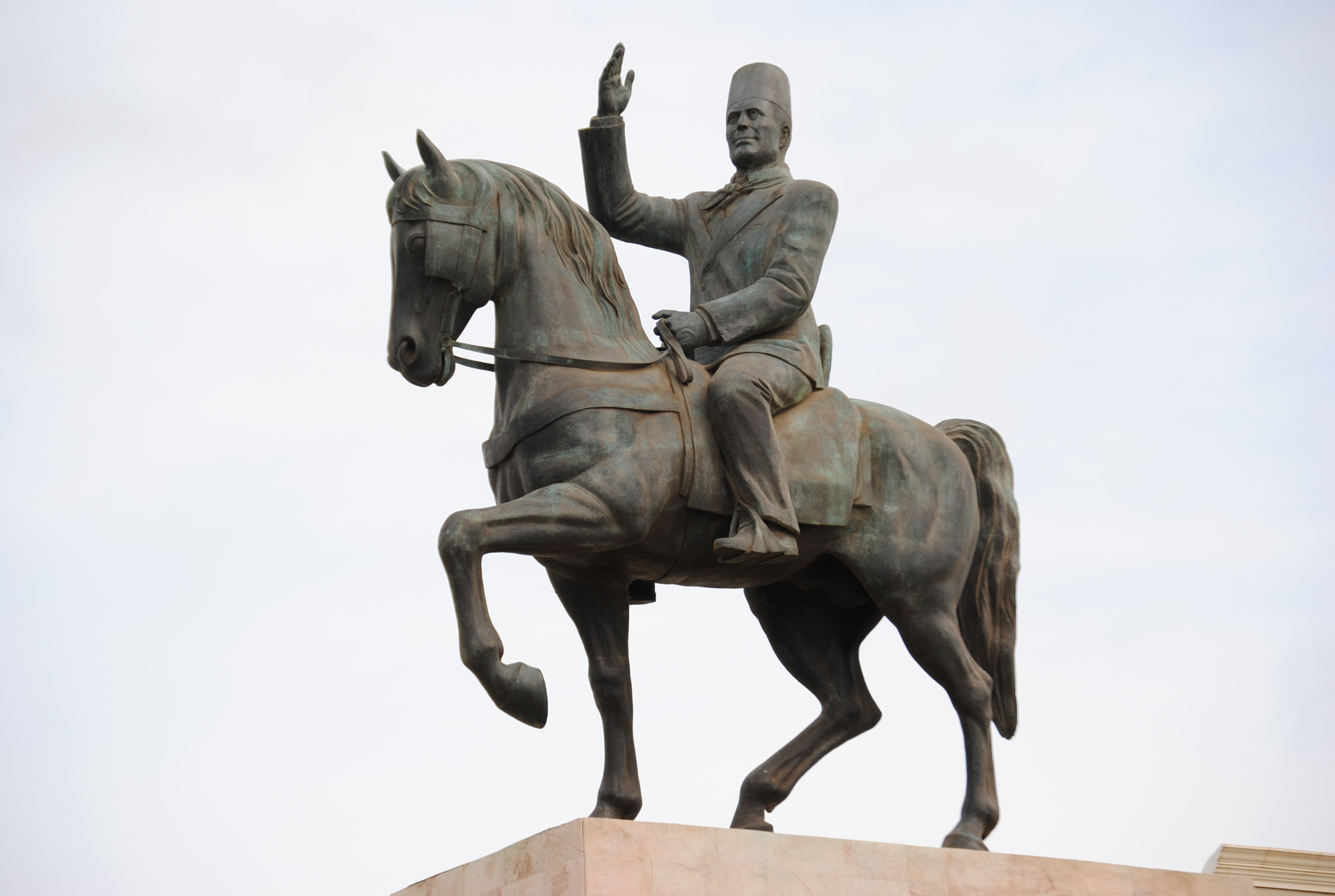
Statue of Habib Bourguiba

Habib Bourguiba, the first leader and president of the Republic of Tunisia, represents a great cult of personality in the history of modern Tunisia. An advocate formed in France in the 1920s, he returned to Tunisia to campaign in nationalist circles. In 1934, at the age of 31, he founded the Neo-Destour, spearhead of the movement for the independence of Tunisia. Several times arrested and exiled by the authorities of the French protectorate, he chose to negotiate with the Fourth Republic, while putting pressure on it, to achieve his goal. Once independence was obtained on March 20, 1956, he helped put an end to the monarchy and proclaim the Republic, of which he took over as first president on July 25, 1957.

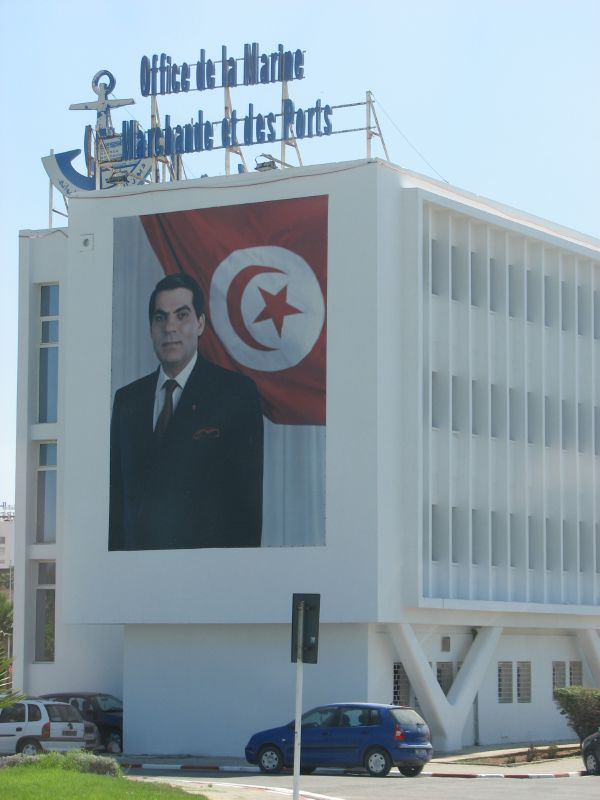
Huge portrait of Ben Ali on a Tunisian state agency building

From then on, he worked to set up a modern state. Among the priorities of its political action are the development of education, the reduction of inequalities between men and women, economic development and a balanced foreign policy, which makes it an exception among the Arab leaders.

Almost all the cities of Tunisia have a street or avenue bearing the name of Bourguiba since the independence of the country. The most famous of them is Avenue Habib Bourguiba located in Tunis. In 1965, it is even, during a trip to ten African countries, that an avenue bears his name in each of the capitals crossed. There is a mausoleum of Bourgiba in Monastir.

Former president Zine El Abidine Ben Ali who ousted Bourgiba and ruled for more than 20 years before fleeing the country during the 2011 revolution, had established a personality cult of his own. Portraits of him could be seen on buildings and crossroads throughout the whole country.

== Turkey ==
=== Republicans ===
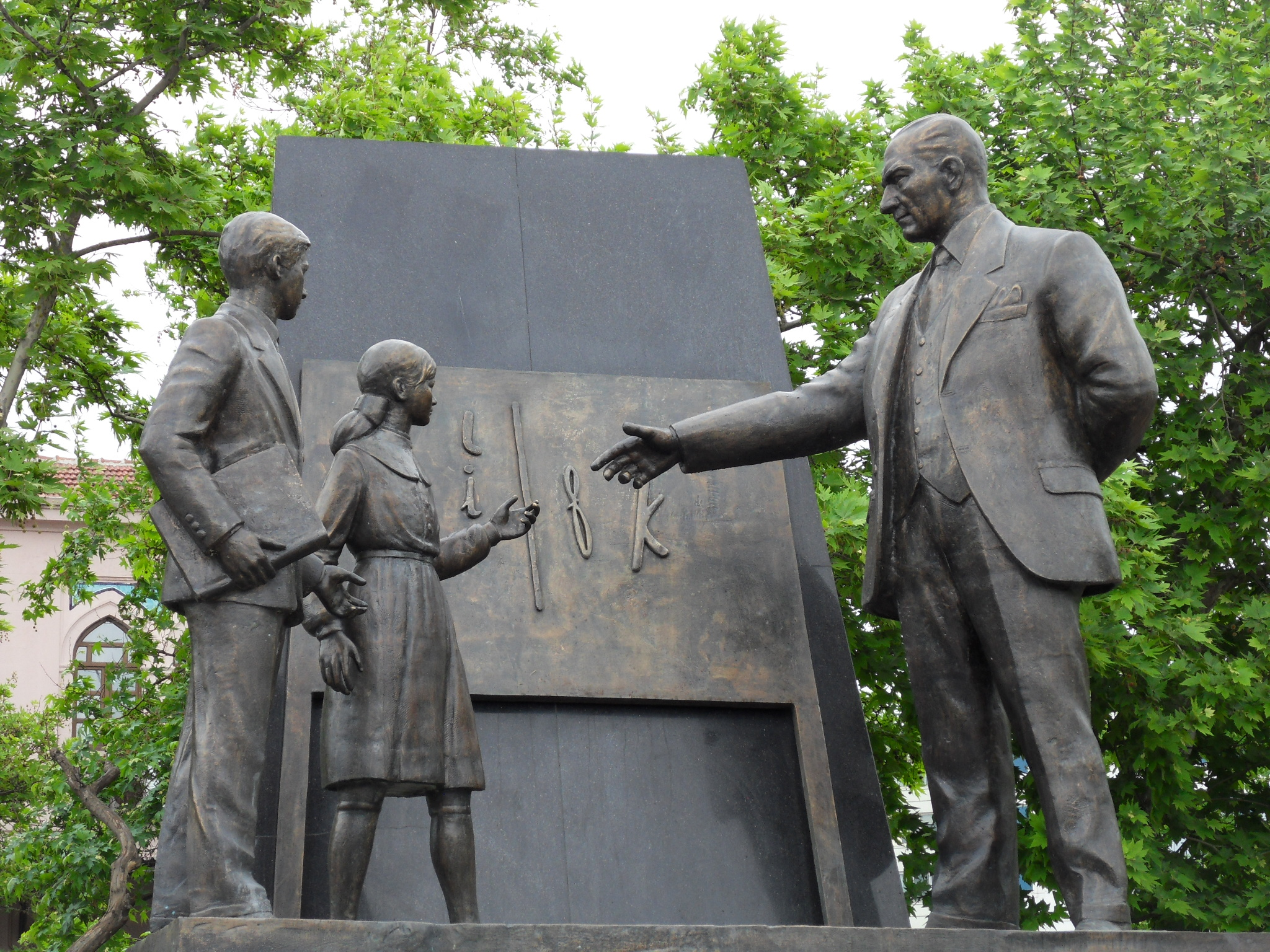
Monument to Atatürk in Kadıköy, Istanbul

In Turkey, founder of the Turkish Republic Mustafa Kemal Atatürk is commemorated by a myriad of memorials throughout the country, such as the Atatürk International Airport in Istanbul, the Atatürk Bridge over the Golden Horn (Haliç), the Atatürk Dam, and Atatürk Stadium. His titles include Great Leader (Ulu Önder), Eternal Commander (Ebedî Başkomutan), Head Teacher (Başöğretmen), and Eternal Chief (Ebedî Şef). Atatürk statues have been erected in all Turkish cities by the Turkish Government, and most towns have their own memorial to him. His face and name are seen and heard everywhere in Turkey; his portrait can be seen in all public buildings, in all schools and classrooms, on all school textbooks, on all Turkish lira banknotes, and in the homes of many Turkish families.

At the exact time of Atatürk's death, on every November 10, at 09:05, most vehicles and people in the country's streets pause for one minute in remembrance. In 1951, the Turkish Parliament issued a law (5816) outlawing insults to his reminiscence (Turkish: hatırasına alenen hakaret) or destruction of objects representing him, which is still in force. There is a government website that is aimed at denouncing different kinds of crimes found on the internet, including with the 8th element crimes committed against Atatürk (Turkish: Atatürk aleyhine işlenen suçlar). The Turkish government as of 2025 has filters in place to block websites deemed to contain materials insulting to his memory.

The start of Atatürk's cult of personality is placed in the 1920s when the first statues started being built. The idea of Atatürk as the "father of the Turks" is ingrained in Turkish politics and politicians in that country are evaluated in relation to his cult of personality. The persistence of the phenomenon of Atatürk's personality cult has become an area of deep interest to scholars.

Atatürk impersonators are also seen around Turkey much after Atatürk's death to preserve what is called the "world's longest-running personality cult".

=== Monarchists ===
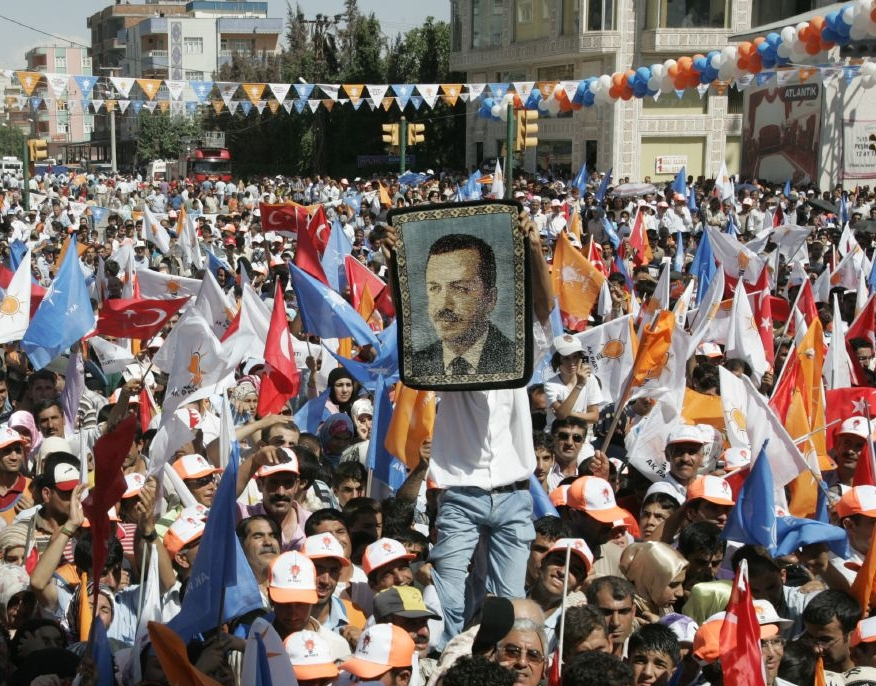
A wall rug of Erdoğan at a rally of his party

Ottoman sultans Mehmed the Conqueror and Abdul Hamid II have cults of personality created by religious conservatives and Islamists. The cults created for the sultans are kept alive by devout Muslims who oppose secular lifestyle and secularist ideas. Scholars have attributed a resurgence in Abdul Hamid's personality cult an attempt to check Atatürk's established image as the founder of modern Turkey.

In recent years there has been a growing cult of personality in Turkey around current President Recep Tayyip Erdoğan.

== Turkmenistan ==
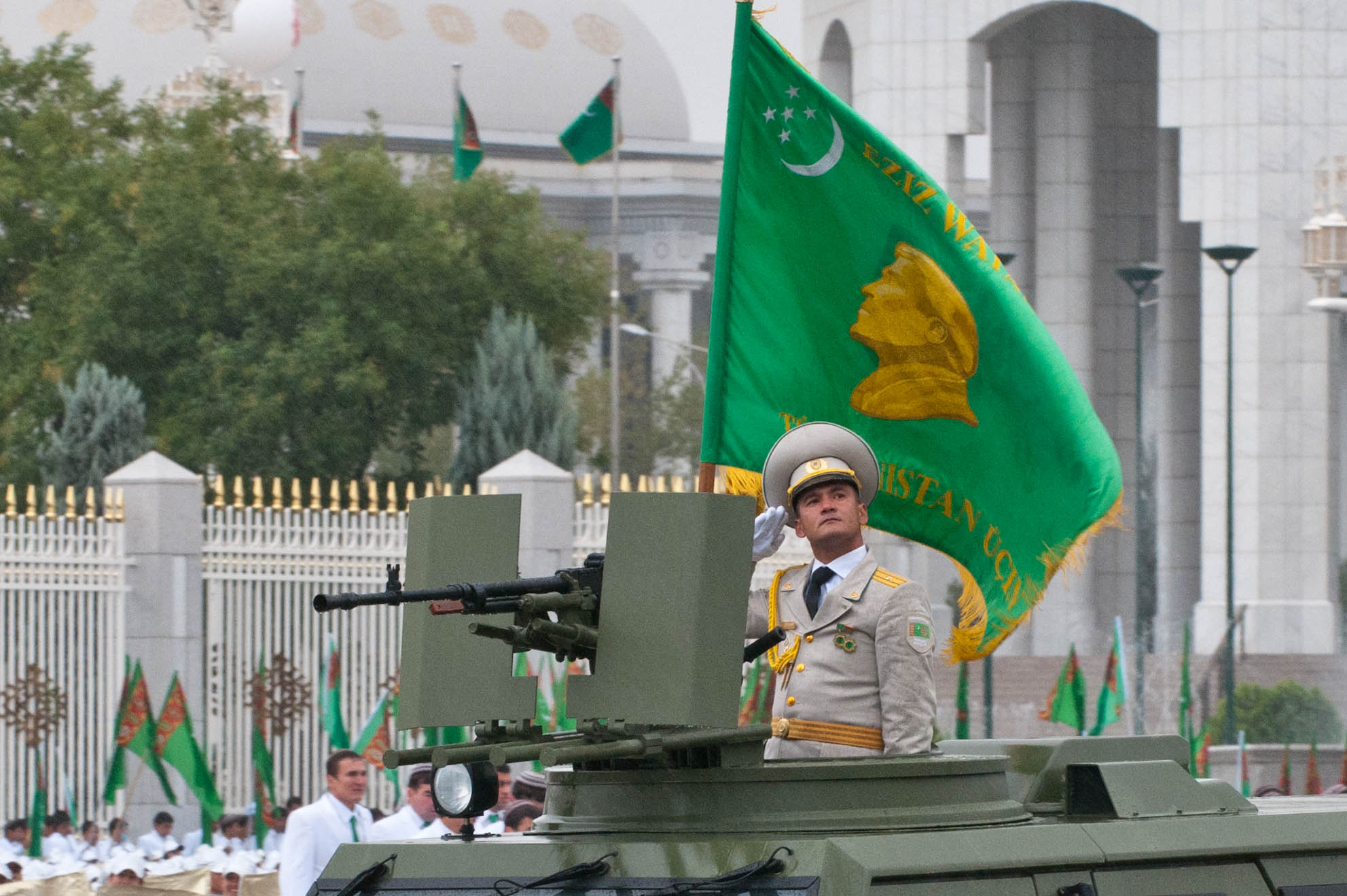
Niyazov in profile on Turkmenistan army flag

Saparmurat Niyazov, who was President of Turkmenistan from 1985 to 2006, is another oft-cited cultivator of a cult of personality. Niyazov simultaneously cut funding to and partially disassembled the education system in the name of "reform", while injecting ideological indoctrination into it by requiring all schools to use his own book, the Ruhnama, as their primary text, and like Kim Il Sung and Muammar Gaddafi, there was even a creation myth surrounding him.

During Niyazov's presidency, there was no freedom of the press or freedom of speech. This meant that opposition to Niyazov was strictly forbidden and major opposition figures were imprisoned, institutionalized, deported, or prompted to flee the country, and their family members were routinely harassed by the authorities. Additionally, a silhouette of Niyazov was used as a logo on television broadcasts, Krasnovodsk town was renamed "Turkmenbashi" after the then president, and schools, airports, and even a meteorite were also named after him and members of his family. Statues and pictures of him were also "erected everywhere". For these and other reasons, the US government said that by the time he died, "Niyazov's personality cult … had reached the dimensions of a state-imposed religion."

Human Rights Watch, in its World Report 2012, said there was a cult of personality of President Gurbanguly Berdimuhamedow and that it was strengthening. Agence France-Presse reported a developing personality cult. Reporters Without Borders said the president was promoting a cult of personality around himself and that his portraits had taken the place of those of the previous president.

== United Kingdom ==
The nature of the Westminster System used in the United Kingdom tends to create assertive figures that are revered in their party. Prime Ministers such as Winston Churchill and Margaret Thatcher sometimes develop a cult of personality due to their long tenure or their leadership through crisis. Reverence for figures such as former Labour Party leader Jeremy Corbyn has also been described as a cult of personality, something that Corbyn himself has admitted to embarrassment at. Following her departure as leader of the Scottish National Party, Nicola Sturgeon was also accused by SNP figures of running a cult of personality within the party. Nigel Farage, the former leader of UKIP and current leader of Reform UK, has been accused of having a cult of personality.

Additionally, the reverence of the British monarchy, particularly the late Queen Elizabeth II, has been described as resembling a cult of personality.

== United States ==
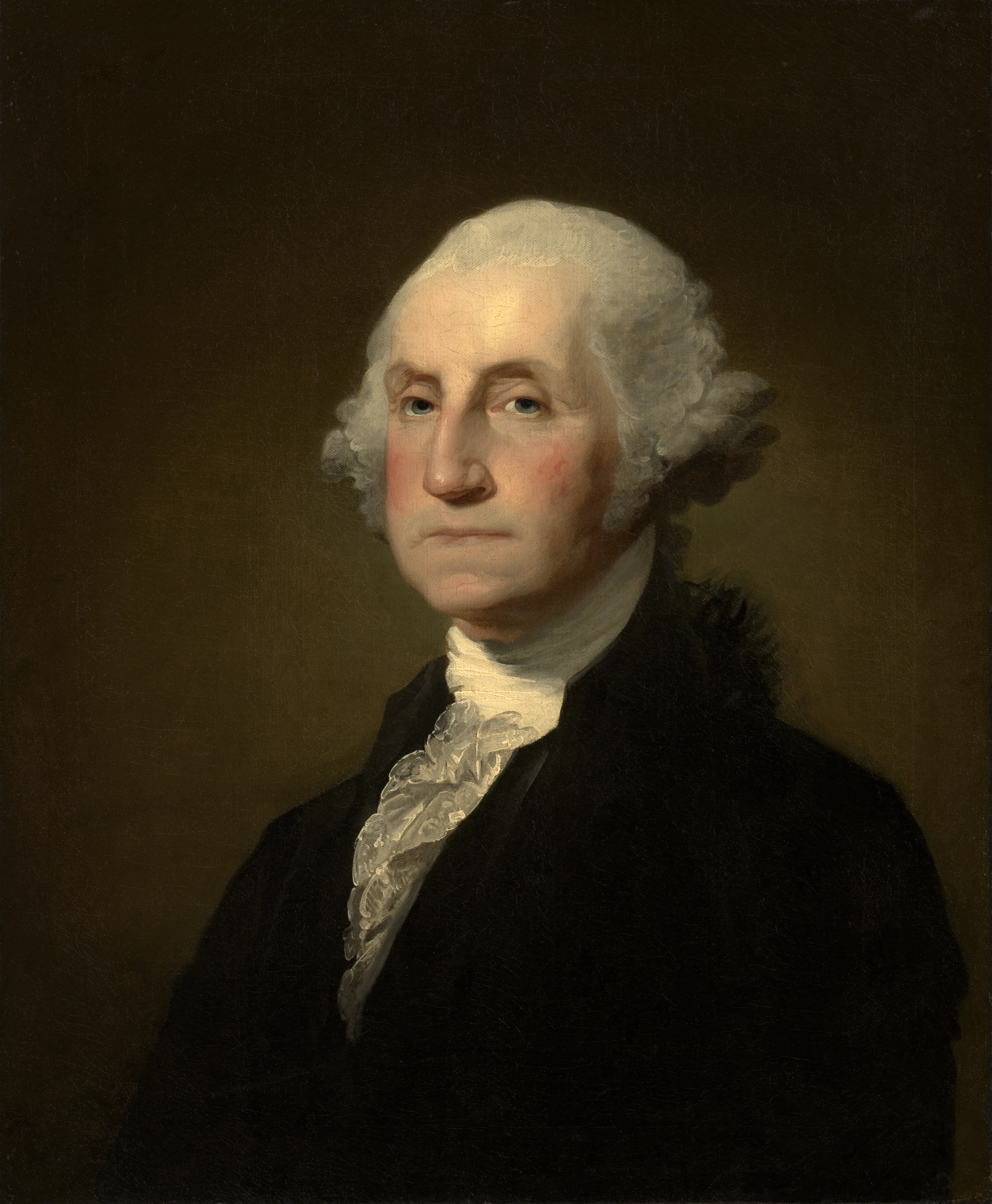
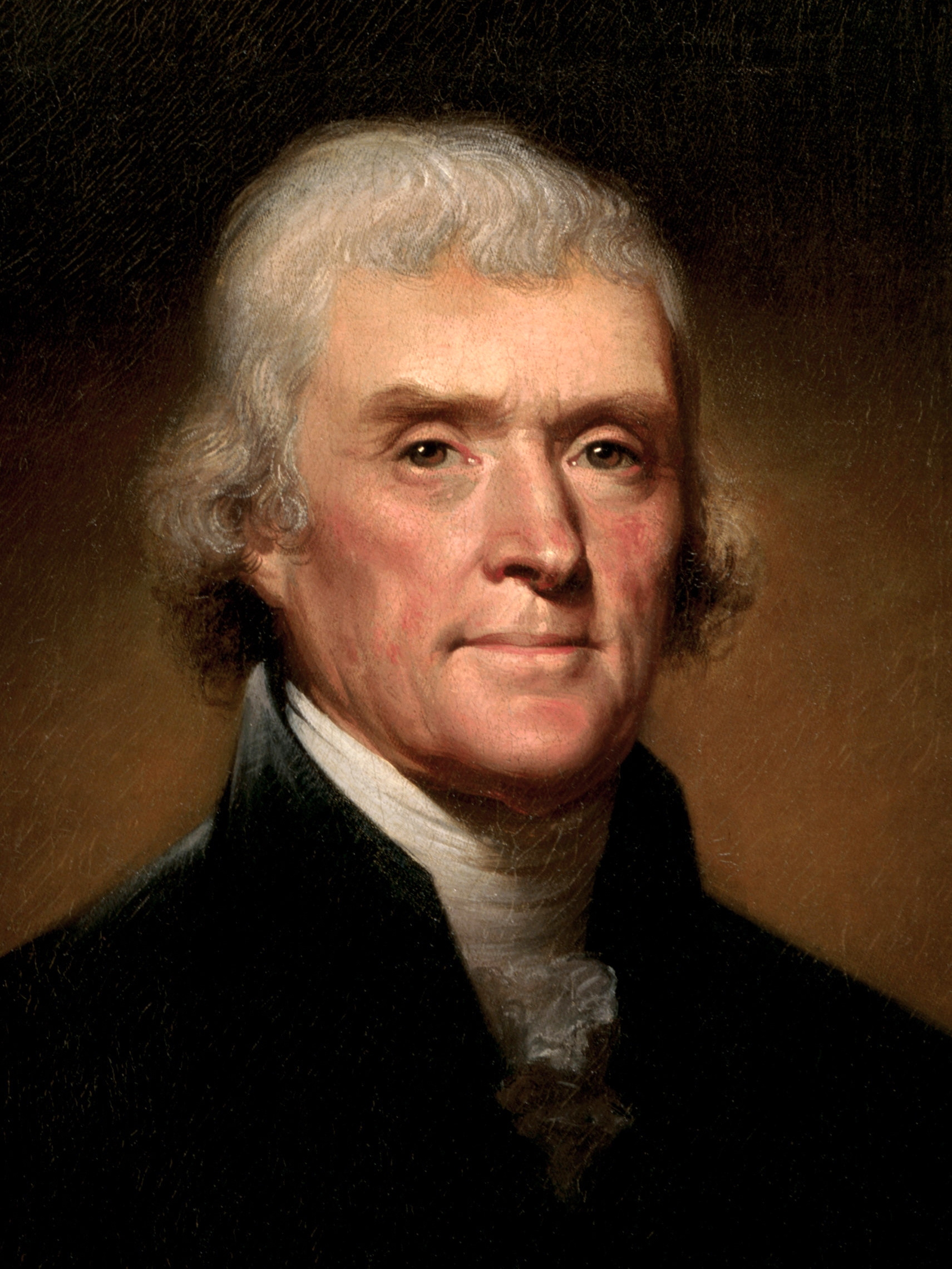
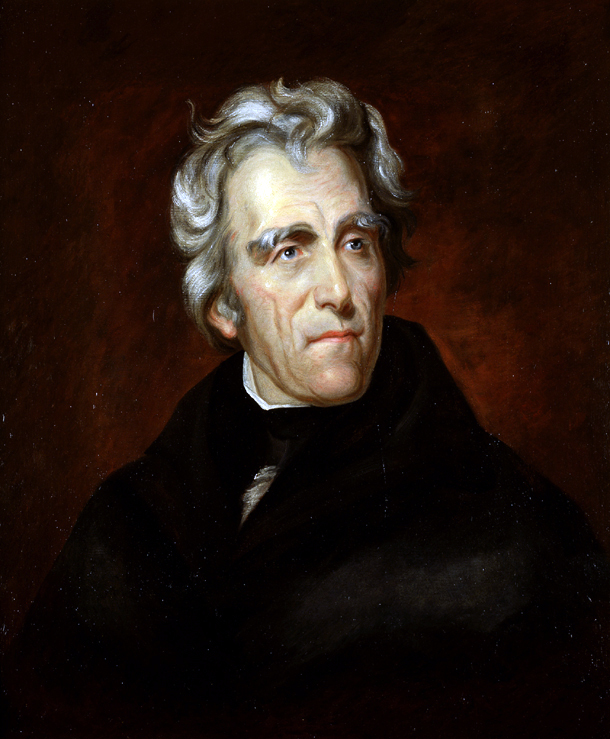
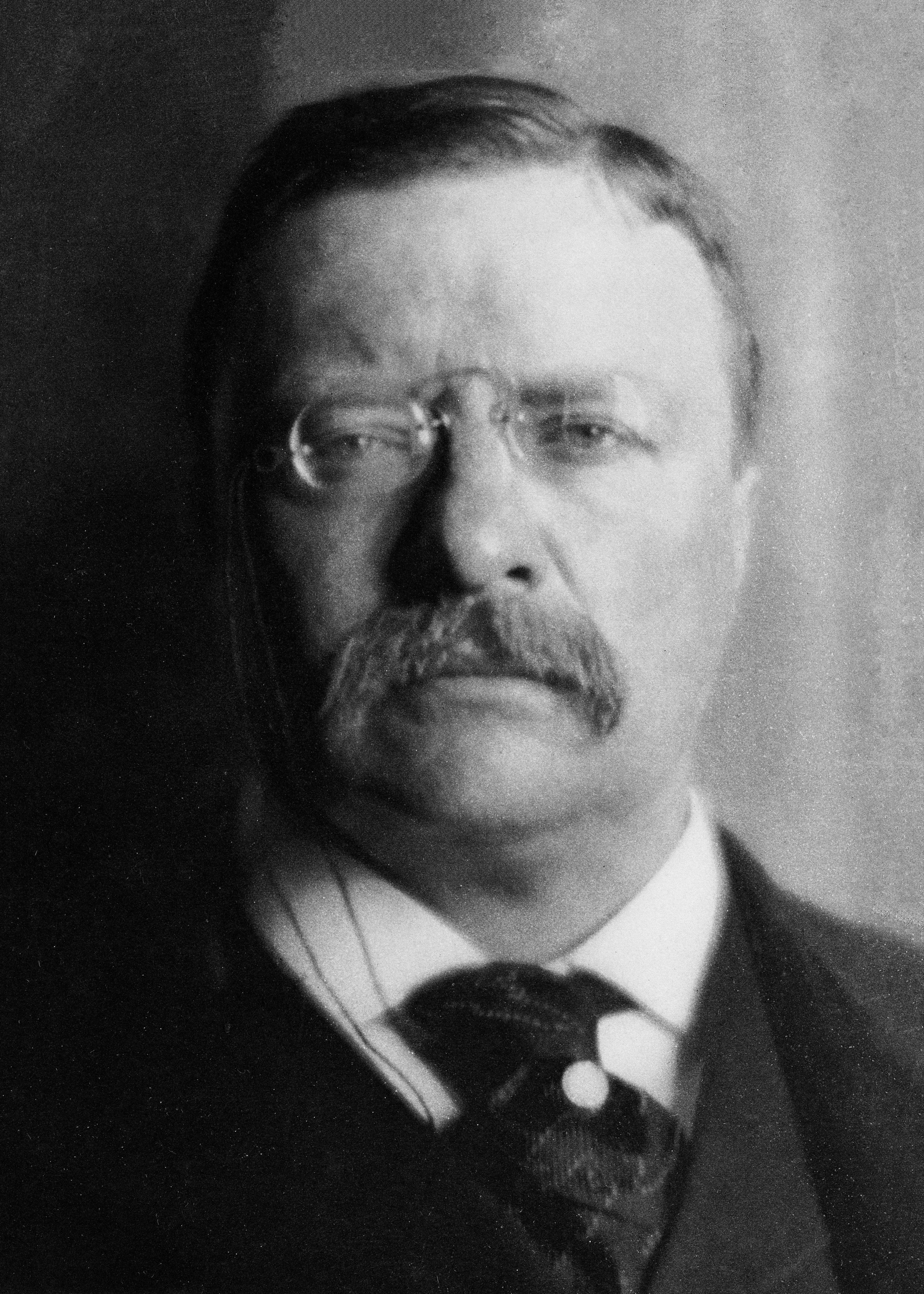
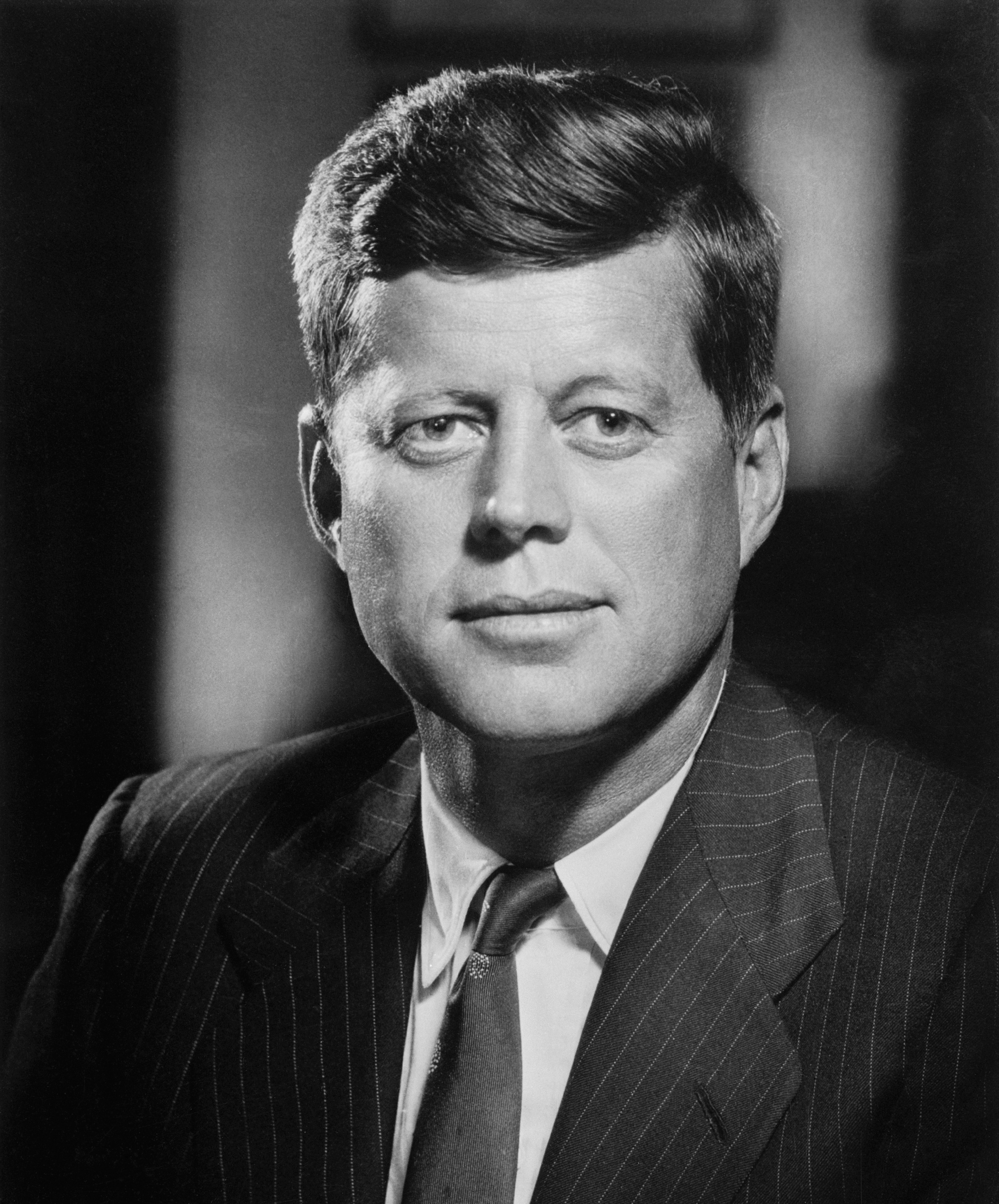
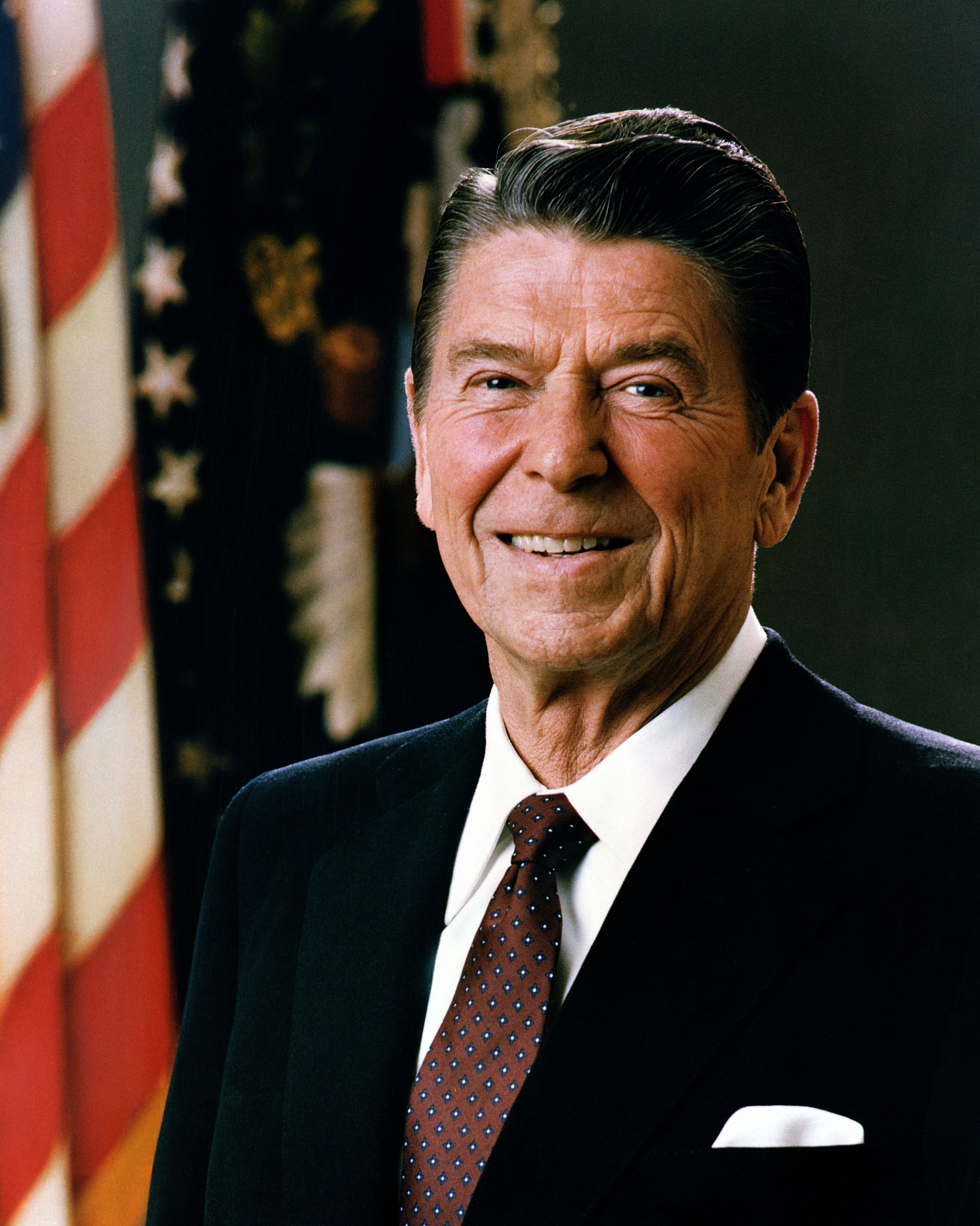
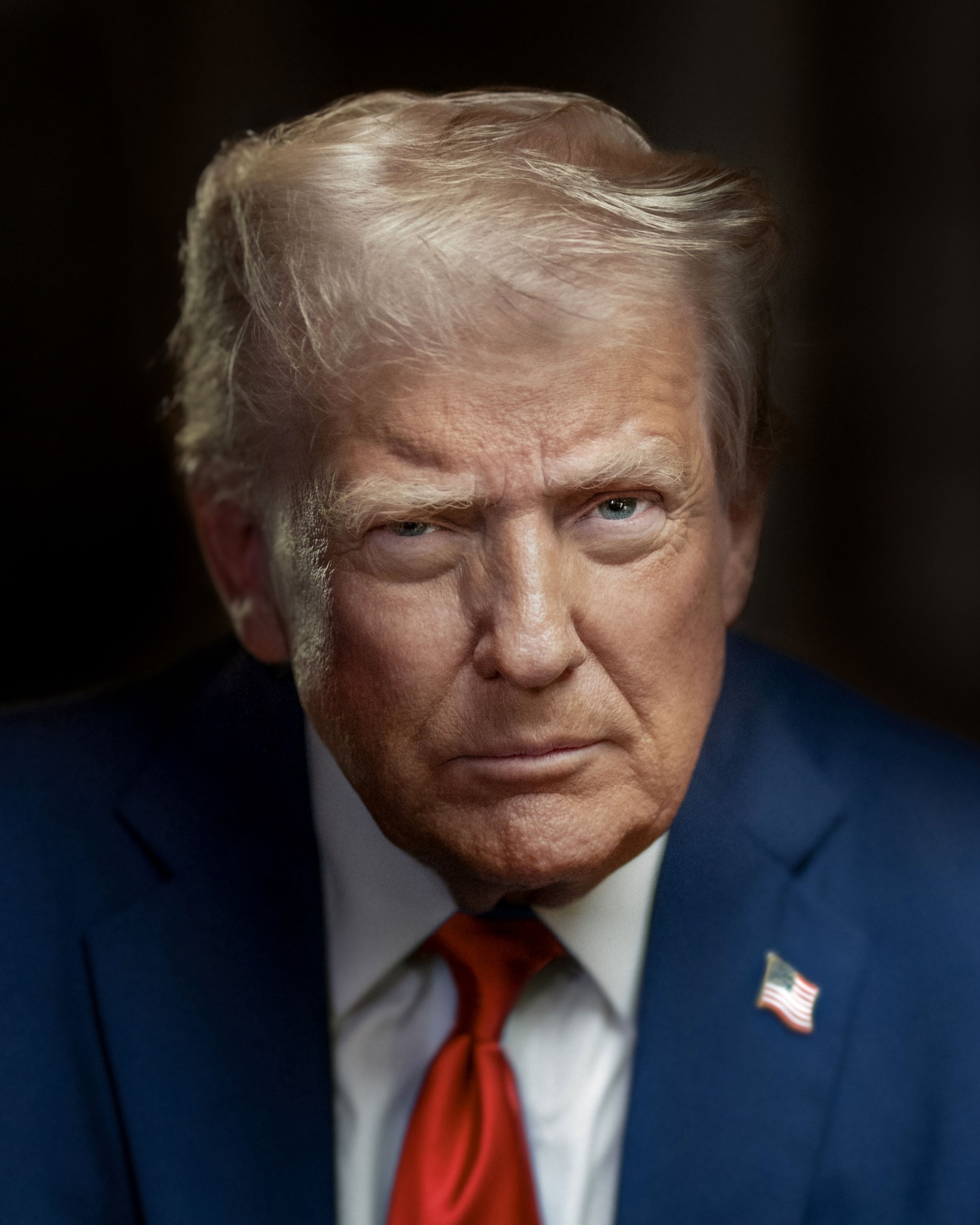
Presidents in American history who have been assessed by various historians as being supported by the effects of a cult of personality include George Washington, Thomas Jefferson, Andrew Jackson, Theodore Roosevelt, Franklin D. Roosevelt, John F. Kennedy, Ronald Reagan, and Donald Trump.

A number of statesmen in American history have been noted by various historians as being supported by the effects of a cult of personality. Among the most reified figures in American historiography are the "Founding Fathers," a group which includes figures like George Washington, Thomas Jefferson, Benjamin Franklin, Paul Revere, and others. Other American statesmen, mostly presidents, have also been described as having personality cults, including Andrew Jackson, Theodore Roosevelt, Franklin D. Roosevelt, Ronald Reagan, and Donald Trump. Conrad Black, who wrote several biographies of American presidents, argued that "supreme champion of the American personality cult" has "deservedly" been Abraham Lincoln. John F. Kennedy's cult of personality largely came about after his assassination, although his and his wife Jackie Kennedy's appearance all contributed to the aura of "Camelot" which surrounded his administration.

Another American politician to whom a cult of personality has been ascribed is Huey Long, the populist governor of Louisiana from 1928 to 1932, who continued to control the politics of the state as a United States senator until he was assassinated in 1935. The LaRouche movement has been considered a personality cult centred around Lyndon LaRouche. Critics of the Revolutionary Communist Party, USA have labeled it a personality cult centered around its leader, Bob Avakian. The MAGA movement is sometimes analyzed as a cult of personality.

== Venezuela ==
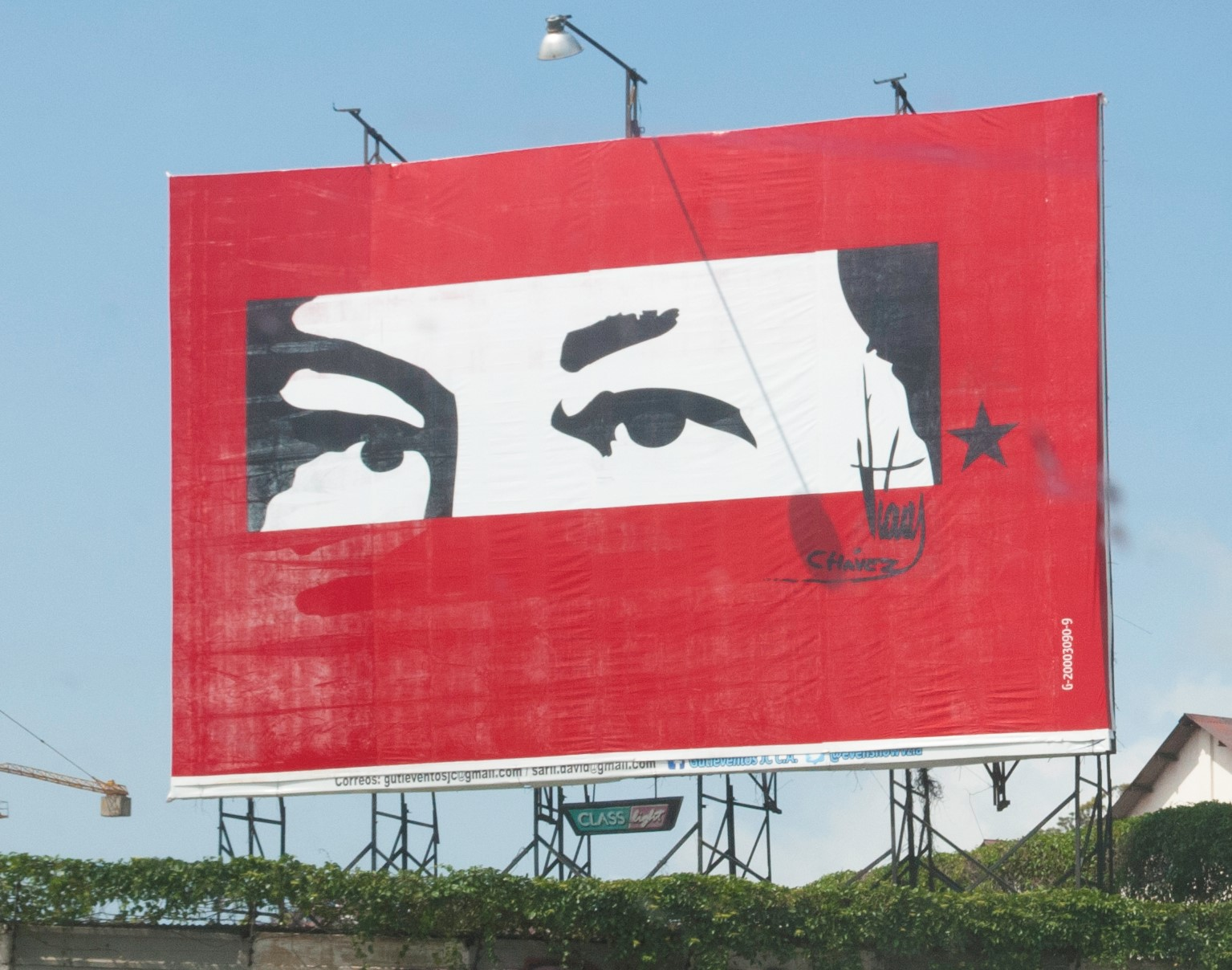
A billboard of Hugo Chávez's eyes and signature in Guarenas, Venezuela

In Venezuela, a cult of personality has been created around the late president Hugo Chávez, in which his supporters venerate him. Chávez largely received his support through his charisma and by spending Venezuela's oil funds on the poor. Since his death, his followers, known as "Chavistas" refer to his death as a "transition to immortality", commonly calling Chávez the "eternal commander". Among his followers, Chávez has been compared to holy figures, especially by his successor Nicolás Maduro.

According to Tomás Straka of Andres Bello University, Chávez's cult of personality began following the 1992 Venezuelan coup d'état attempts which Chávez led, with Straka explaining that some Venezuelans "saw no solution to their most fundamental problems and they saw in Chávez a savior, or an avenger of those groups that had no hope". Since the beginning of Chávez's tenure in 1999, the Venezuelan government manipulated the Venezuelan public with social programs depicting him as a great leader for the people. The struggles that Chávez endured throughout his presidency, such as the 2002 Venezuelan coup d'état attempt, also drew compassion from his followers which boosted his support. By the time of Chávez's death, speculation about potential Chavista reactions to his death were compared to the sorrow felt by those in North Korea who mourned the death of Kim Jong Il, with one scholar of Latin America from the University of California Santa Barbara, Juan Pablo Lupi, stating that the creation of Chávez's cult of personality was "very well-staged, all this process of myth-making and appealing to the feelings and religious sentiment of the people. This is something that is quasi-religious". The creation of Chávez's cult of personality was a strategy used by his government to maintain legitimacy before and after his death.

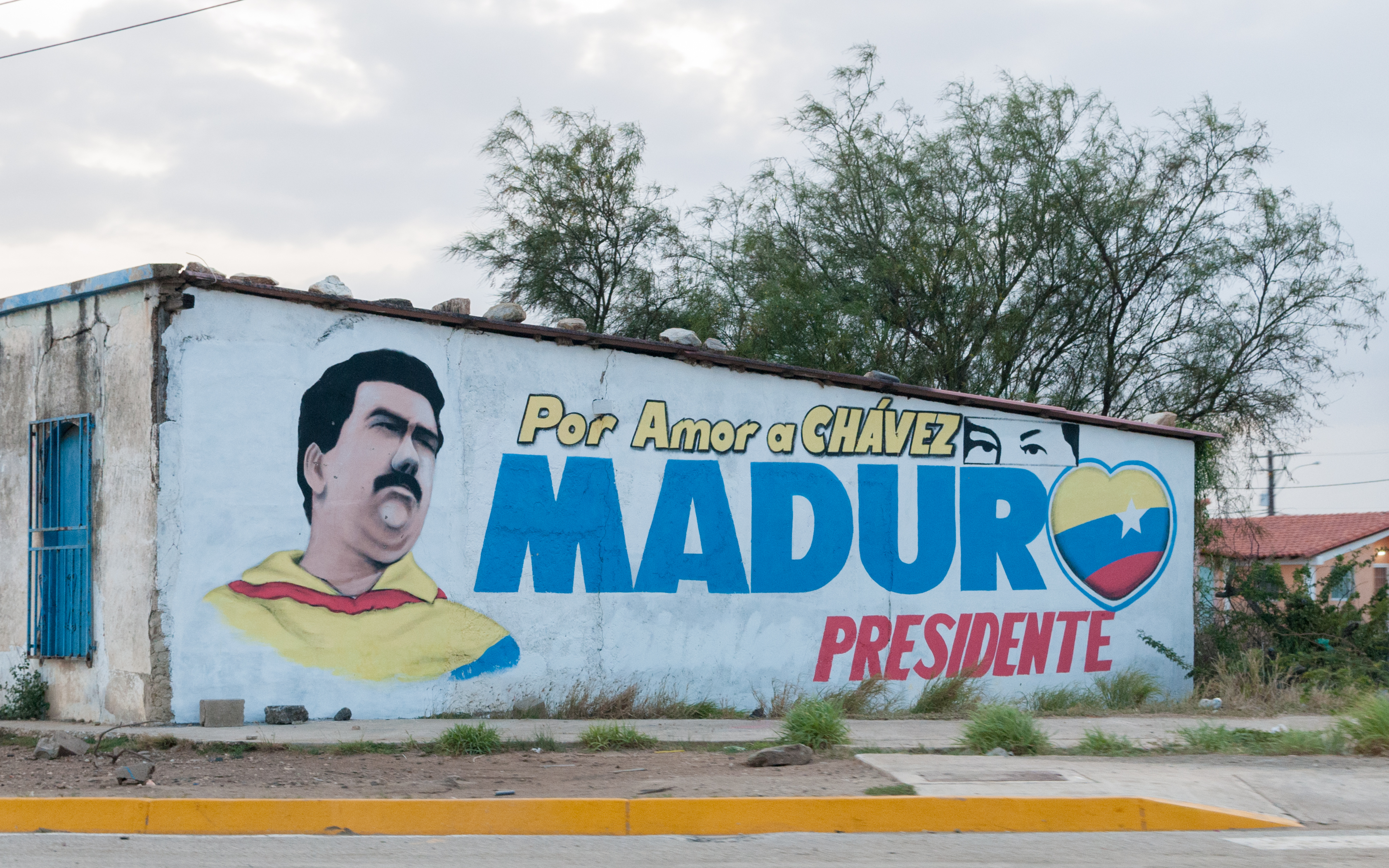
A mural of Nicolás Maduro, saying "For the love of Chávez. Maduro (for) President." with the popular "Chávez eyes" visible.

His successor, Nicolás Maduro, had a similar cult of personality, framing himself as the "Son of Chávez," dominating public media with heroic iconography, such as the Súper Bigote cartoon, and flooding urban landscapes with official murals and billboards. Following Maduro's ousting during the 2026 United States intervention in Venezuela, Maduro's cult of personality was systematically erased by authorities.

== Vietnam ==
=== Communist Vietnam ===
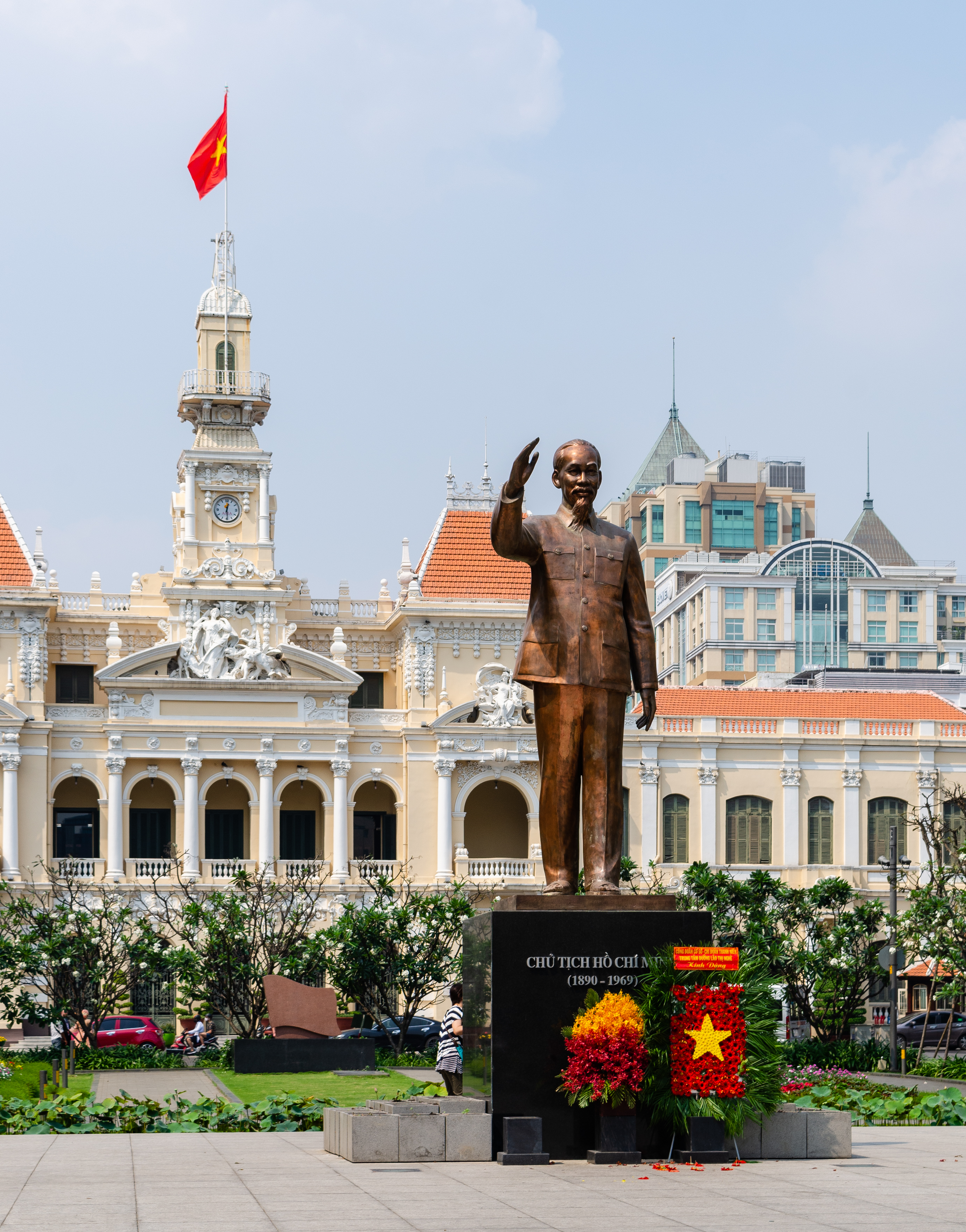
Ho Chi Minh statue in front of the City Hall of Ho Chi Minh City

The Vietnamese Communist Party regime has continually maintained a personality cult around Ho Chi Minh since the 1950s in North Vietnam, and it was later extended to South Vietnam after reunification, which it sees as a crucial part of its propaganda campaign surrounding Ho and the Party's past. The official communist philosophy in Vietnam is called Ho Chi Minh thought (tư tưởng Hồ Chí Minh). Ho Chi Minh is frequently glorified in schools by schoolchildren. Opinions, publications and broadcasts that are critical of Ho Chi Minh or that identify his flaws are de facto banned in Vietnam, and the commentators are arrested or fined for "opposing the people's revolution". Some people "worship the President", according to a BBC report.

The former capital of South Vietnam, Saigon, was officially renamed Ho Chi Minh City on May 1, 1975, one day after its capture, which officially ended the Vietnam War.

=== South Vietnam ===
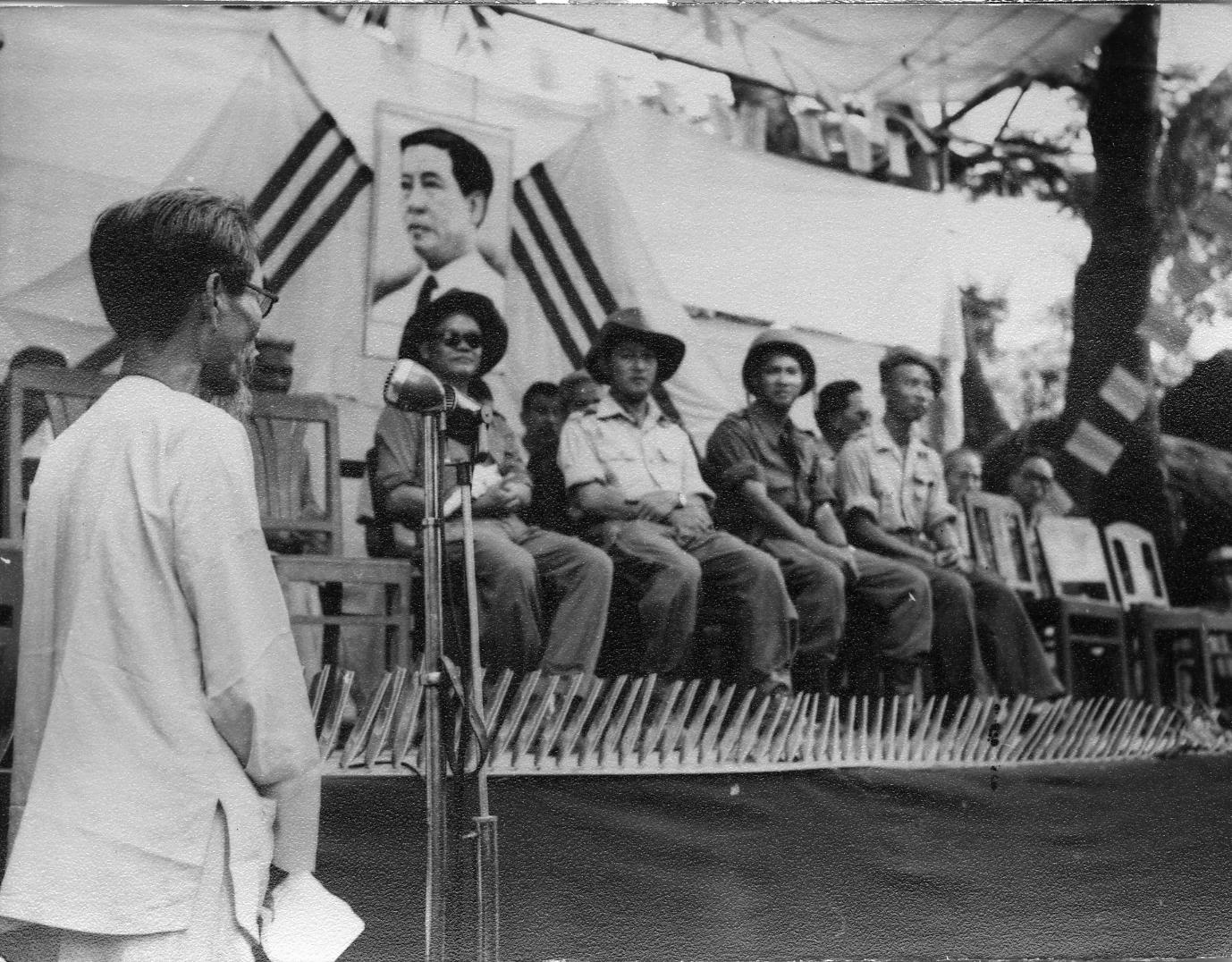
Portrait of President Ngo Dinh Diem during a pro-government demonstration in South Vietnam

The establishment of a personality cult of Ngo Dinh Diem, who was the leader of South Vietnam, was a part of his efforts to legitimize his regime by organizing propaganda maintaining a Vietnamese national identity centered on his leadership and his ideals. In 1954, Ngo Dinh Diem launched the National Revolutionary Movement (NRM), a mass political organization designed to spread Ngo Dinh Diem's Person Dignity Theory and his policies and suppress the subversives to the regime, as opposed to the Personalist Labor Revolutionary Party which operated entirely out of public view. During the indoctrination campaigns led by the NRM, which were inspired by the ones of Vichy France, the government officials of South Vietnam repeated to the Vietnamese peasantry lectures given by the Ngo brothers on personalist principles of government and citizenship. In 1955, Ngo Dinh Diem launched the Ministry of Information and Youth to carry out propaganda and censorship activities, throughout which the Ministry sought to build a personality cult around Ngo Dinh Diem similar to the one of Ho Chi Minh ("Uncle Ho"). The Ministry presented Ngo Dinh Diem as an "enlightened sovereign" who could improve the lot of all Vietnamese by creating "economic and social stability for all" within a personalist framework, and constructed a public narrative of his life, focused on such episodes as his "refusal to compromise Vietnamese autonomy."

== Yugoslavia ==
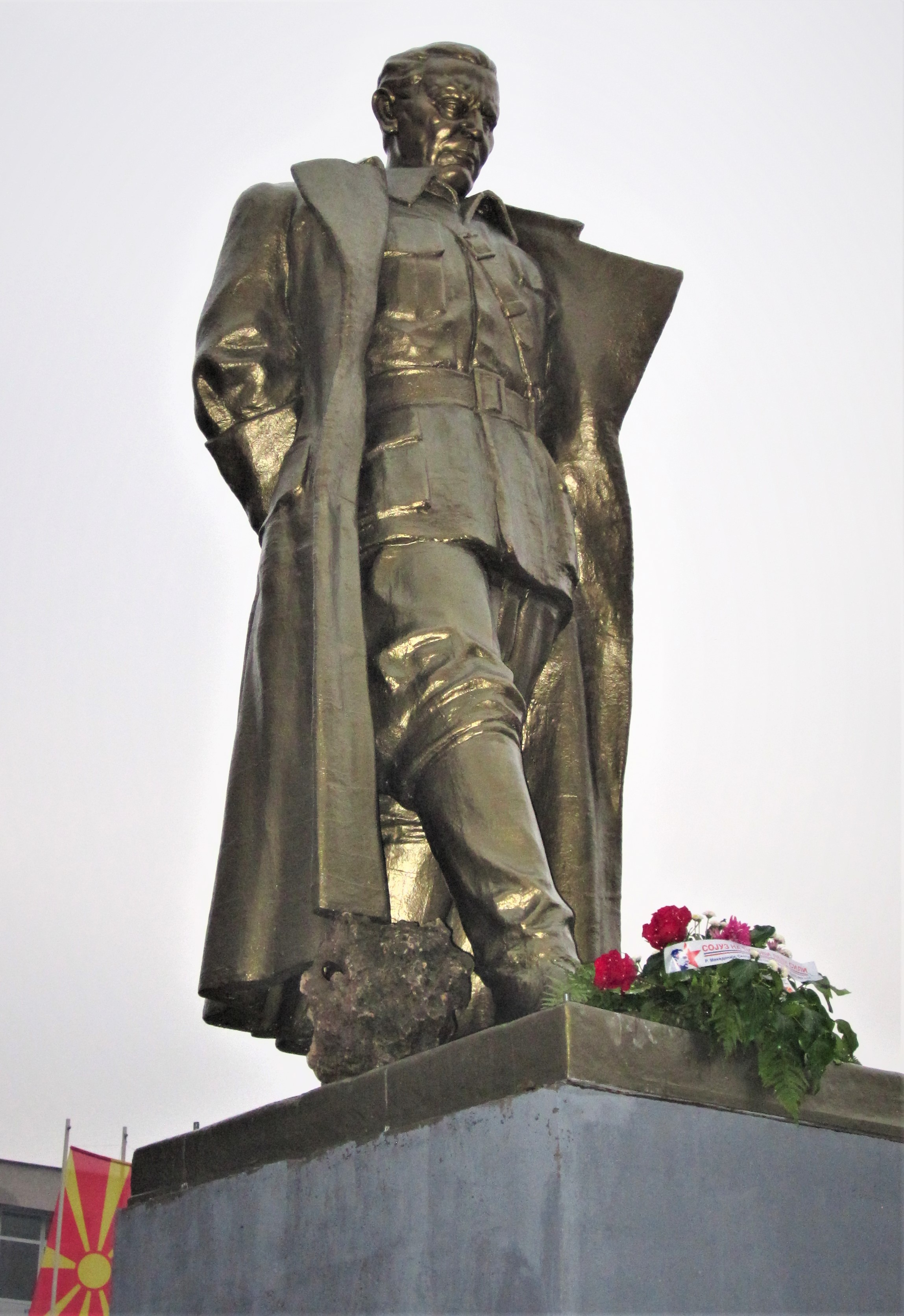
Josip Broz Tito statue in Skopje, North Macedonia

A cult of personality was developed around Josip Broz Tito, the leader of Yugoslavia from 1945 to 1980. Emerging from his leading role in Yugoslav Partisans' liberation struggle in World War II, Tito's cult of personality went on to be solidified by the Tito–Stalin split of 1948, embarking Yugoslavia on a path towards a socialist system independent of the Soviet Union. Aside from priding Yugoslavia on an international scene, Tito's call for brotherhood and unity of Yugoslav nations and similar methods made his position in the Yugoslav political landscape an important unifying force that held Yugoslavia together. His cult has been described as a combination of a "peasant chief, protector and the legendary hero". During his lifetime, his cult of personality included, among other things, naming places after him (including four cities), celebrations of his birthday (including Relay of Youth), widespread use of his portraits, writing his name in landscapes so that they could be seen from the air, etc.

== Yemen ==
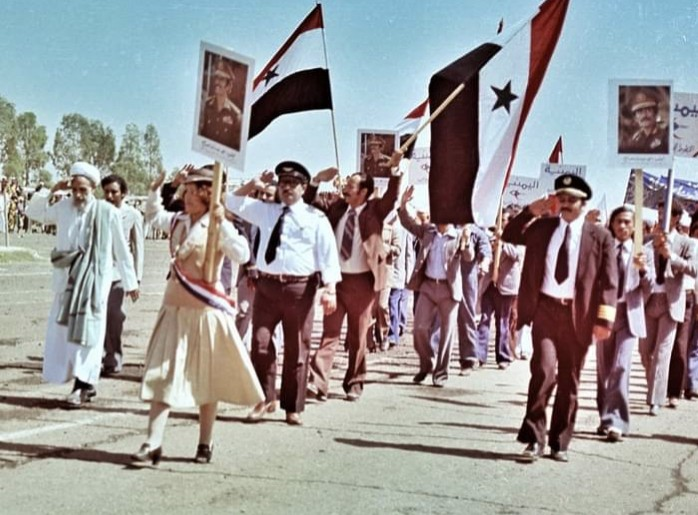
Marching with flags and Saleh portraits, 1983

Until the Yemeni revolution in 2011, there was a personality cult around the former President Ali Abdullah Saleh during his tenure that increased with supporters giving credit to Saleh for the unification of Yemen, displaying him as the defender of Arab nationalism as Chairman of Yemen's long-time sole legal party, the General People's Congress and as a defender of Yemen in military uniform with field marshal shoulderboards.

== Zaire ==
Mobutu Sese Seko used his cult of personality to create a god-like public image of himself in Zaire, which today is the Democratic Republic of the Congo. Mobutu created a totalitarian state, amassed massive wealth for himself and presided over the economic deterioration of his country and human rights abuses.

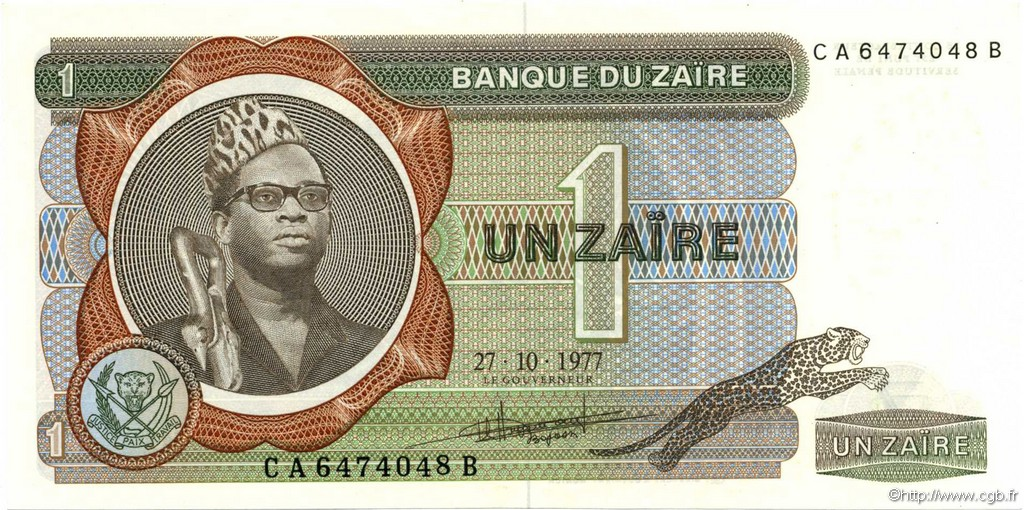
Mobutu's depiction in the 1977-issued 1 zaire banknote

He used mass media communications to entrench his rule.

Mobutu embarked on a campaign of pro-African cultural awareness and in 1972, he formally changed his name from Joseph-Désiré Mobutu to Mobutu Sese Seko Nkuku Ngbendu Wa Za Banga ("The all-powerful warrior who, because of his endurance and inflexible will to win, goes from conquest to conquest, leaving fire in his wake.")

== Zimbabwe ==
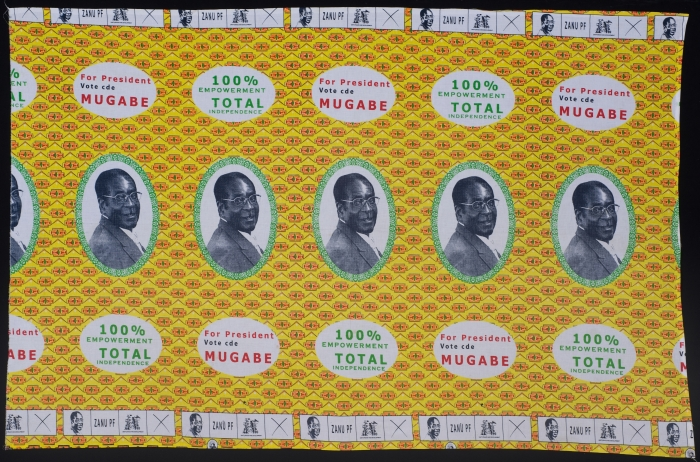
Cloth propagandizing Robert Mugabe, leader of the ZANU-PF party, for the 2008 general elections

Robert Mugabe, who was 93 years old, was Africa's oldest president in office before the 2017 Zimbabwean coup d'état when he was overthrown. Serving as Prime Minister and President of Zimbabwe from 1980, Mugabe was driven by a cult of personality supported by the public media's exaltation, which presented him as the only qualified leader that no other individual was qualified to rule.

His long reign resulted in the progressive militarization of the state under civilian authority, combining military power with civilian rule. He declared he would not step down until he won his fight against the British and Americans’ regime change agenda for the Zimbabwean independence. In terms of the economy, he portrayed himself as the defender of the interests of the majority black Zimbabweans, resembling the personalization of power.
