= List of equestrian statues in Spain =

This is a list of equestrian statues in Spain.

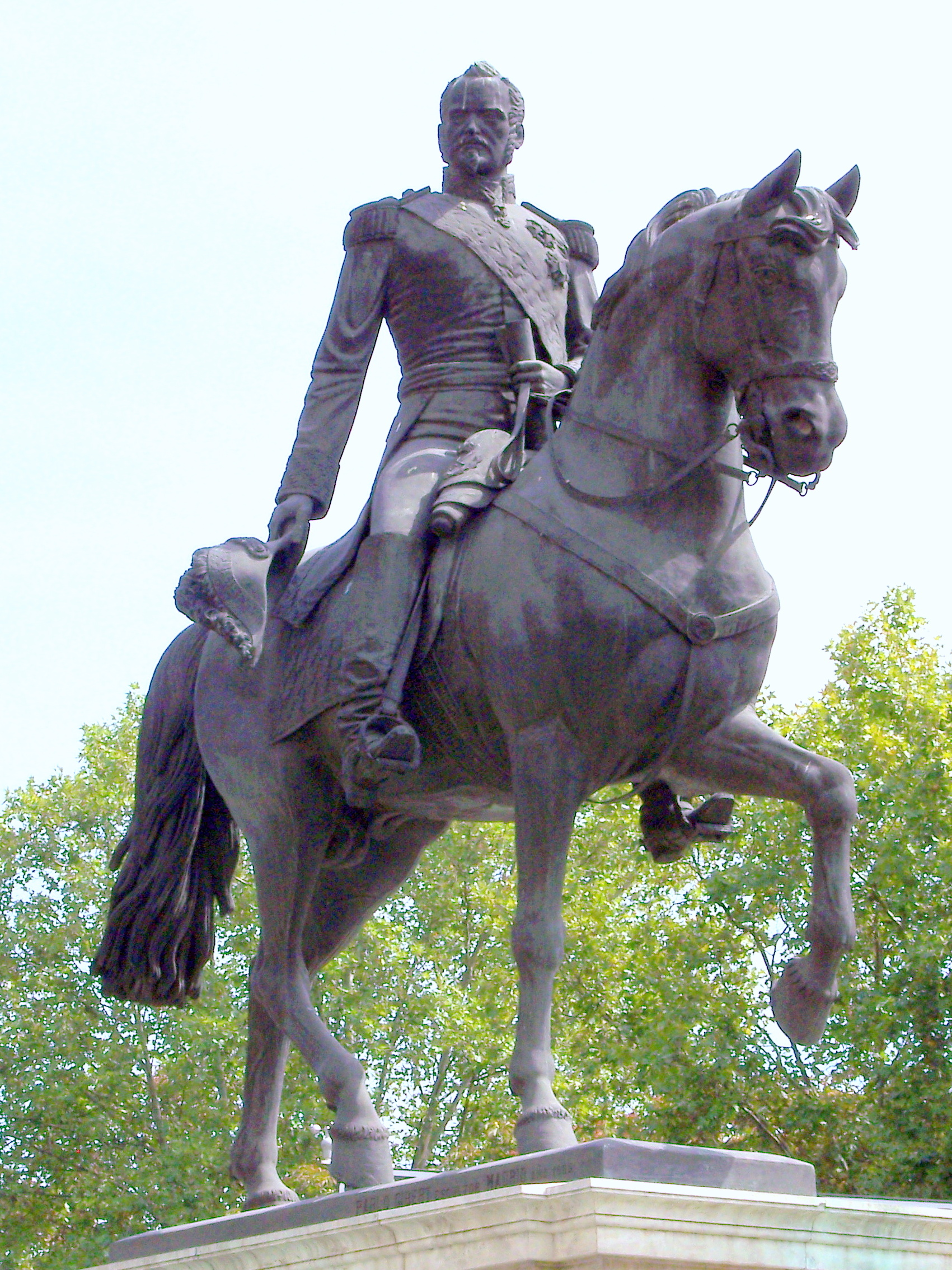
Bronze equestrian statue of General Baldomero Espartero, by Pablo Gibert, in Madrid.

== Madrid ==
- Equestrian of King Philip III by Giambologna and Pietro Tacca at the Plaza Mayor, 1616, installed in the present place in 1848.
- Equestrian of King Felipe IV by Pietro Tacca at the Plaza de Oriente. It was inaugurated in 1843. The bronze equestrian statue was made between 1634 and 1640 by Pietro Tacca, who requested Galileo Galilei's advice to achieve its stability: rear part is solid and front is hollow
- Equestrian of Queen Isabella of Castile by Manuel Oms Canet, 1883.
- Equestrian of Manuel Gutiérrez de la Concha by Andrés Aleu, 1885.
- Equestrian of General Baldomero Espartero, the Peacemaker, by Pablo Gibert, 1886. Probably the best known equestrian sculpture in Spain.
- Equestrian of General Martínez Campos by Mariano Benlliure at the Retiro Park, 1907.
- Equestrian of King Alfonso XII by Mariano Benlliure at the Retiro Park, 1909.
- Equestrian of Don Quixote and Sancho Panza, by Lorenzo Coullaut Valera, part of the Monument to Cervantes at the Plaza de España, 1930.
- An aluminium equestrian Los Portadores de la Antorcha (The Torch Bearers) by Anna Hyatt Huntington at the Plaza de Ramón y Cajal (square) in the Ciudad Universitaria, 1955.
- Equestrian of José de San Martín in the Parque del Oeste, 1961. The statue is a replica of the one in Buenos Aires by Louis-Joseph Daumas, 1862.
- Equestrian of King Carlos III at the Puerta del Sol. Made by Miguel Ángel Rodríguez and Eduardo Zancada in 1994. The statue is a replica of a smaller one sculpted by Juan Pascual de Mena in the 18th century.
- Equestrian of Simón Bolívar in the parque del Oeste. Made by Emilio Laíz Campos. Unveiled in 1970.
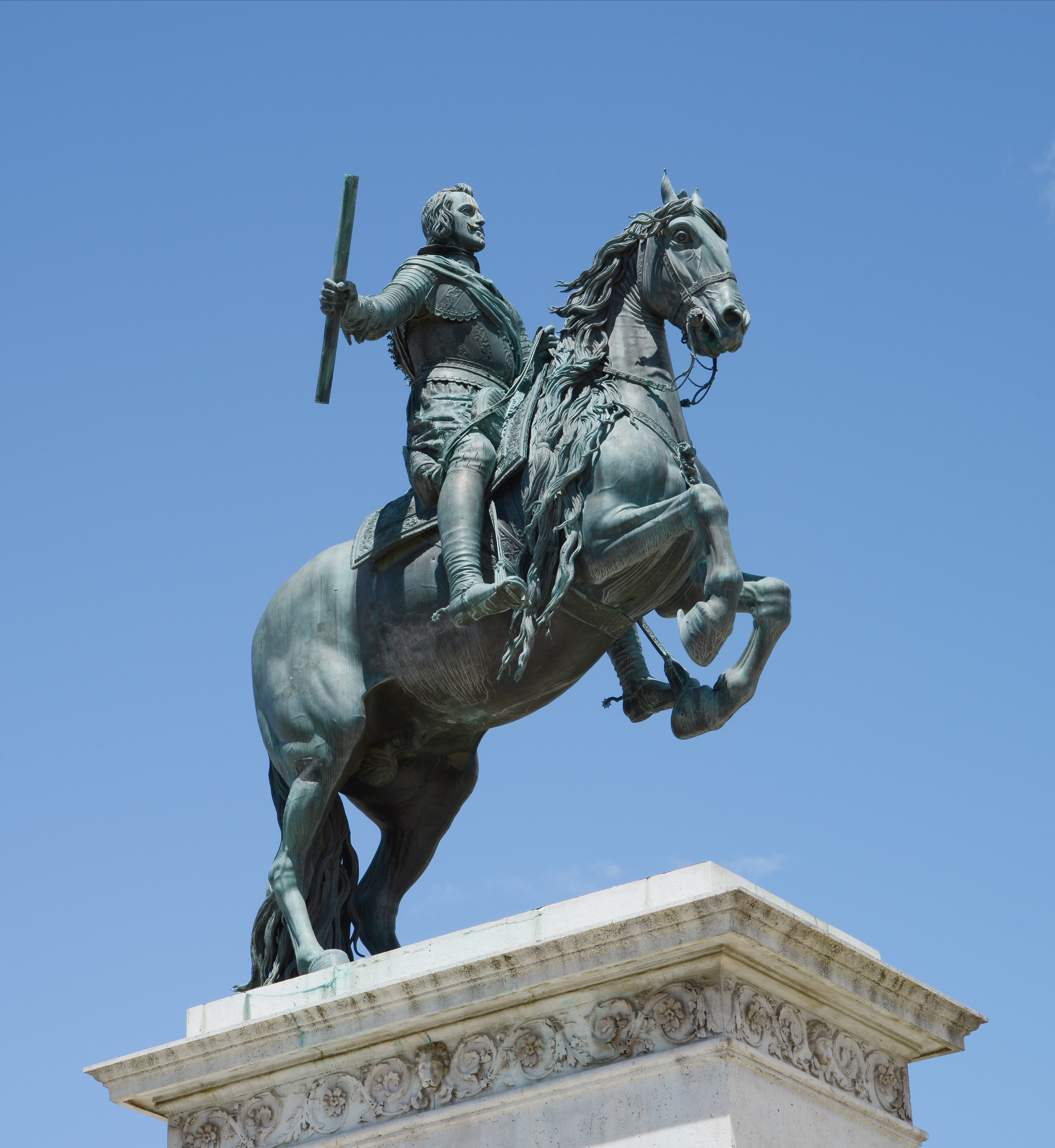
King Felipe IV

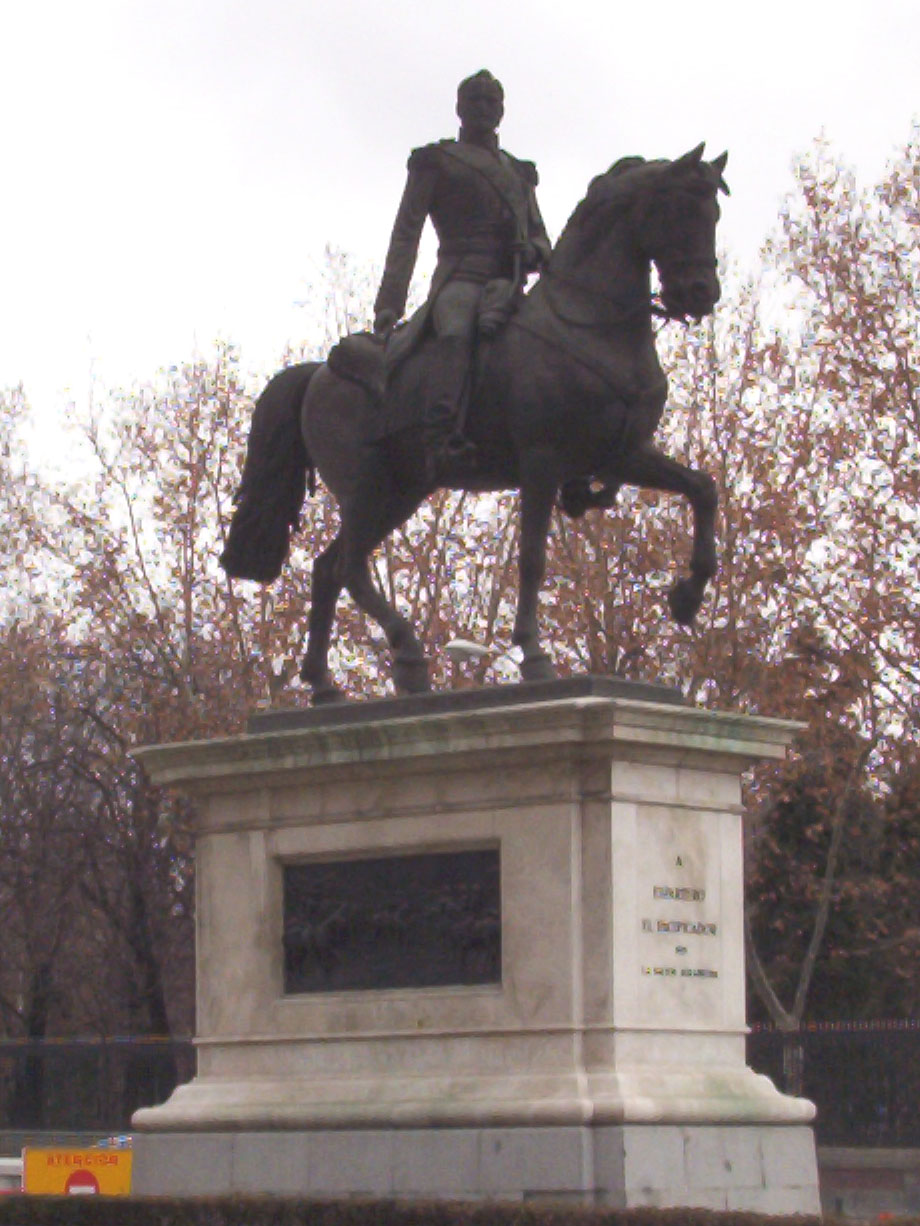
General Baldomero Espartero

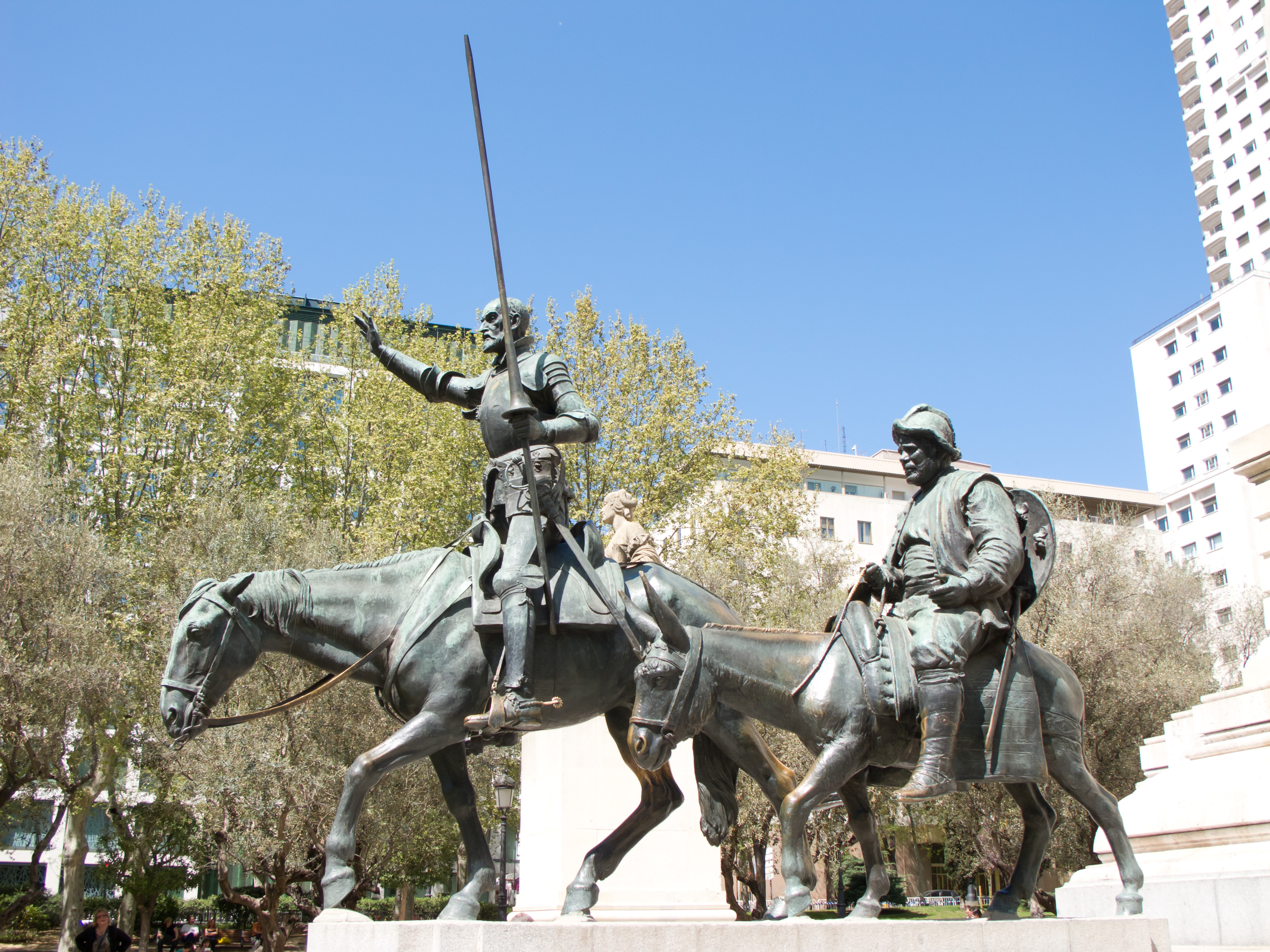
Don Quixote and Sancho Panza portion of the larger Monument to Cervantes

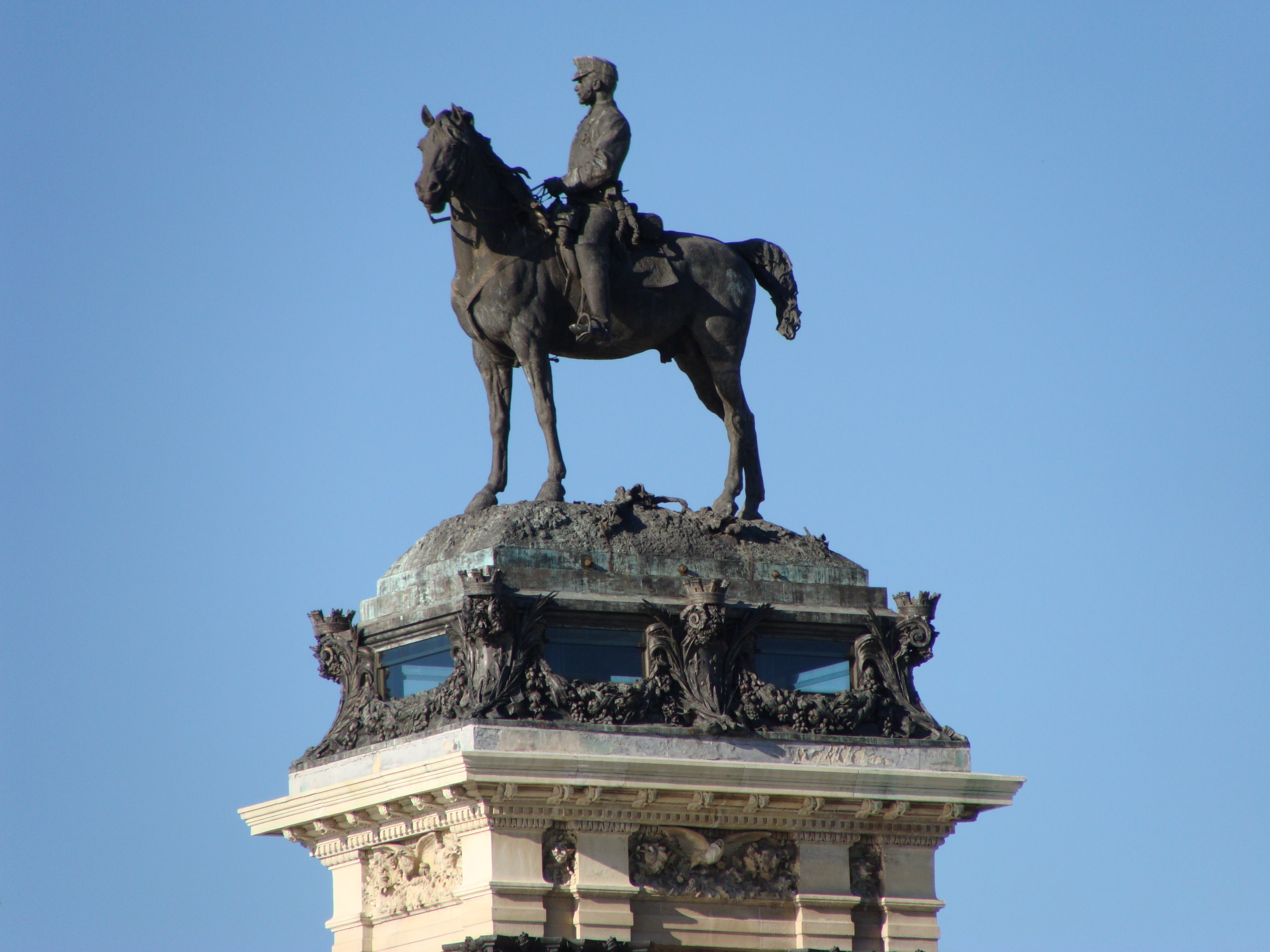
King Alfonso XII

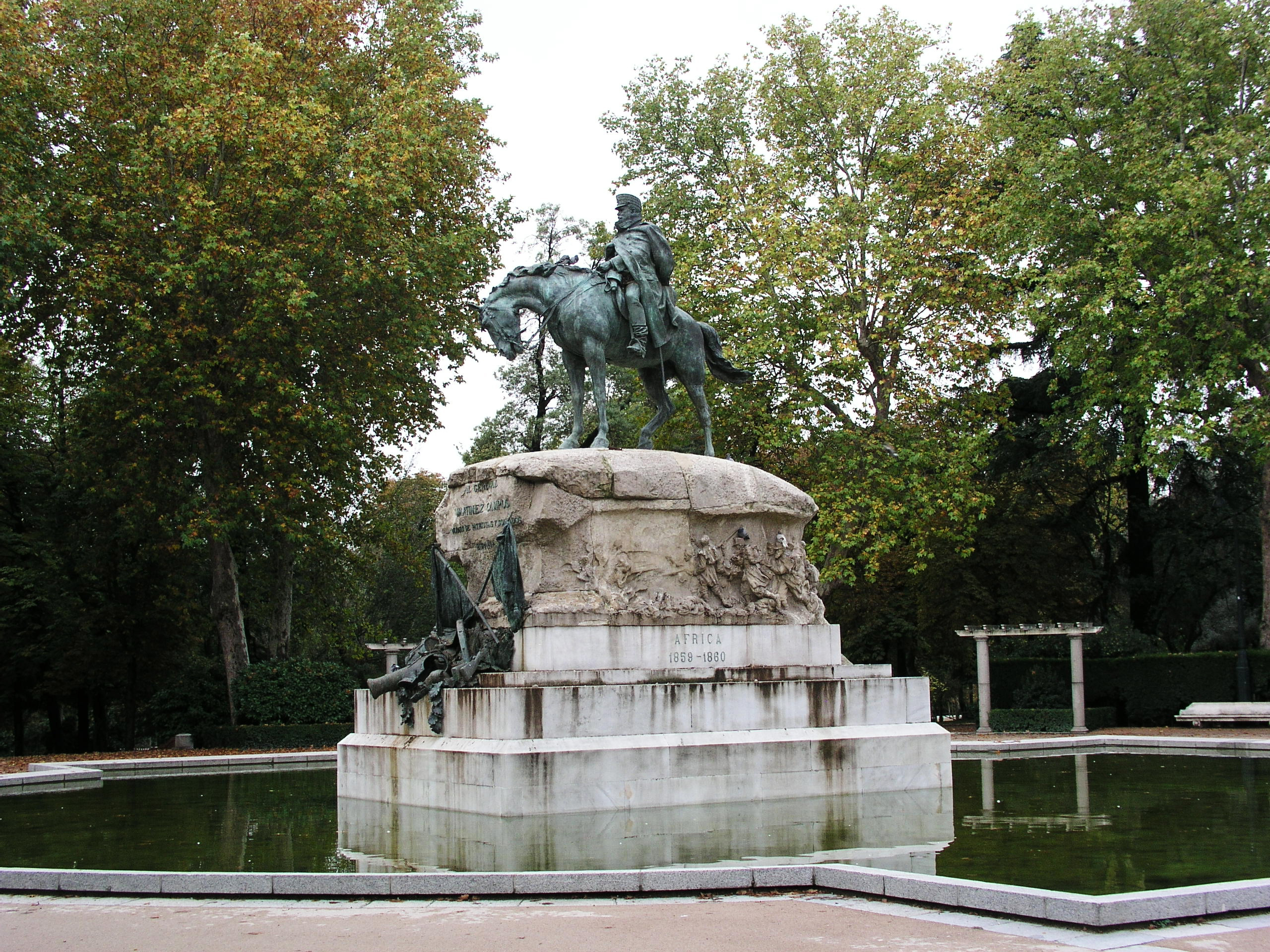
General Martínez Campos

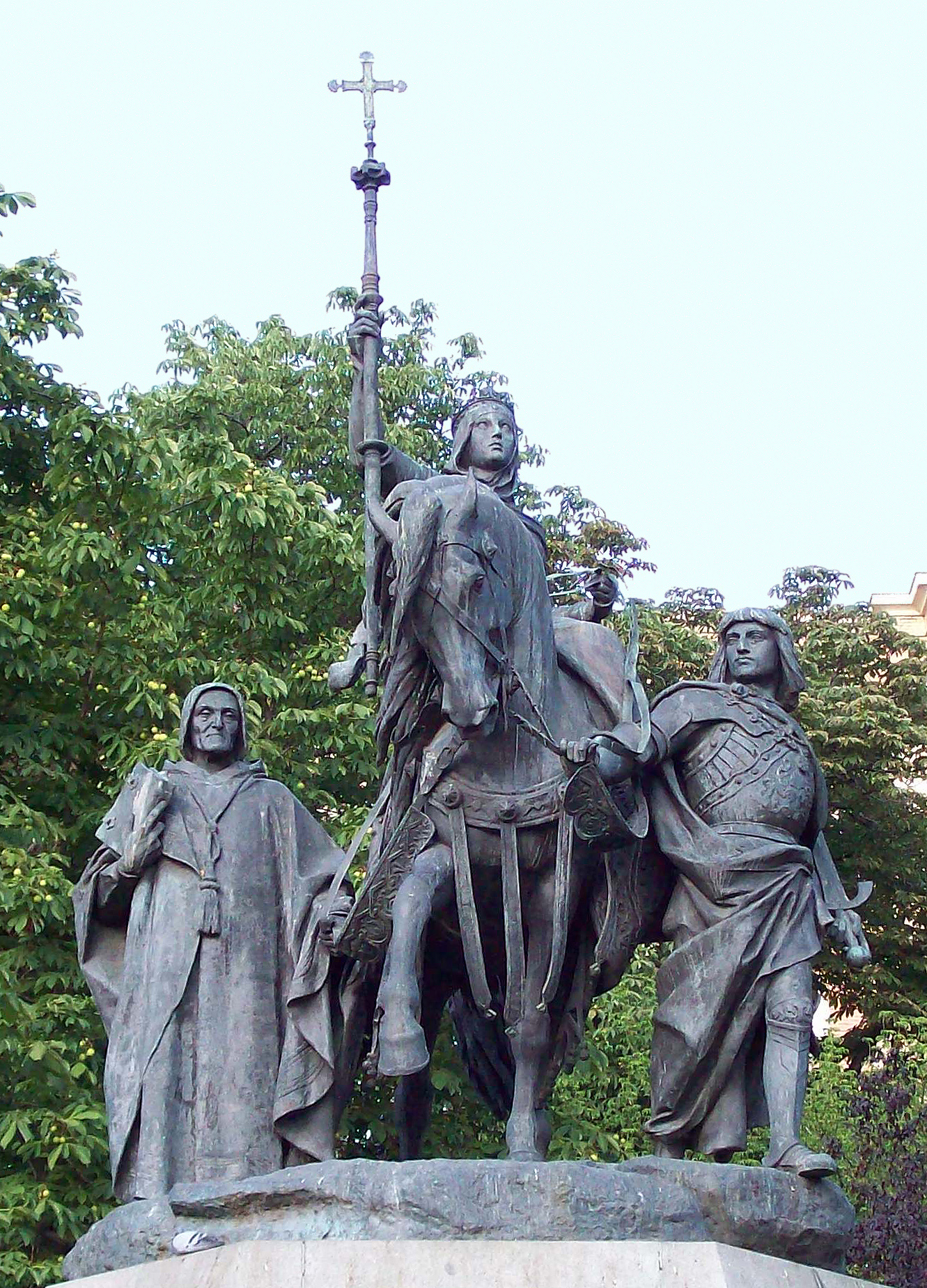
Queen Isabella of Castile

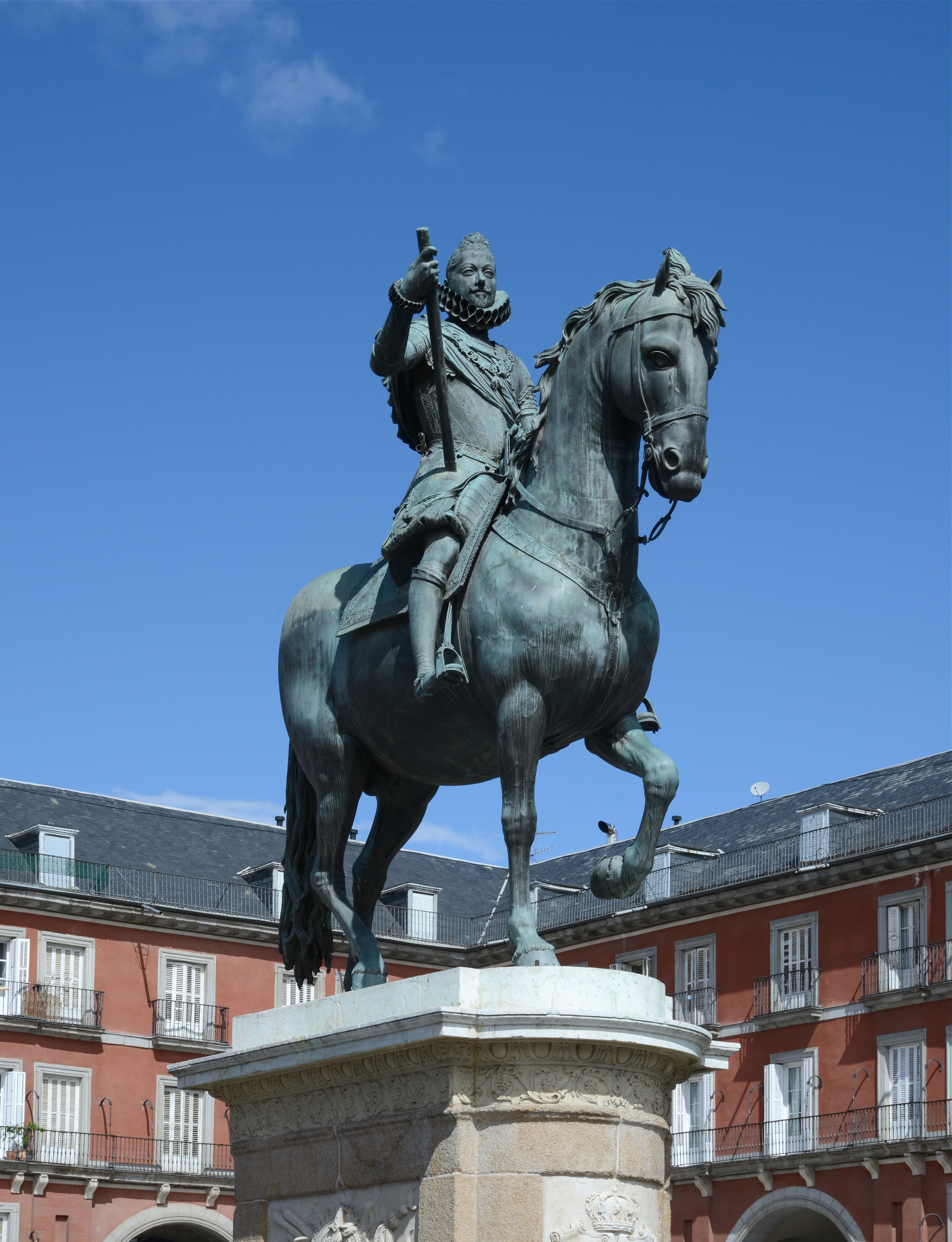
King Philip III

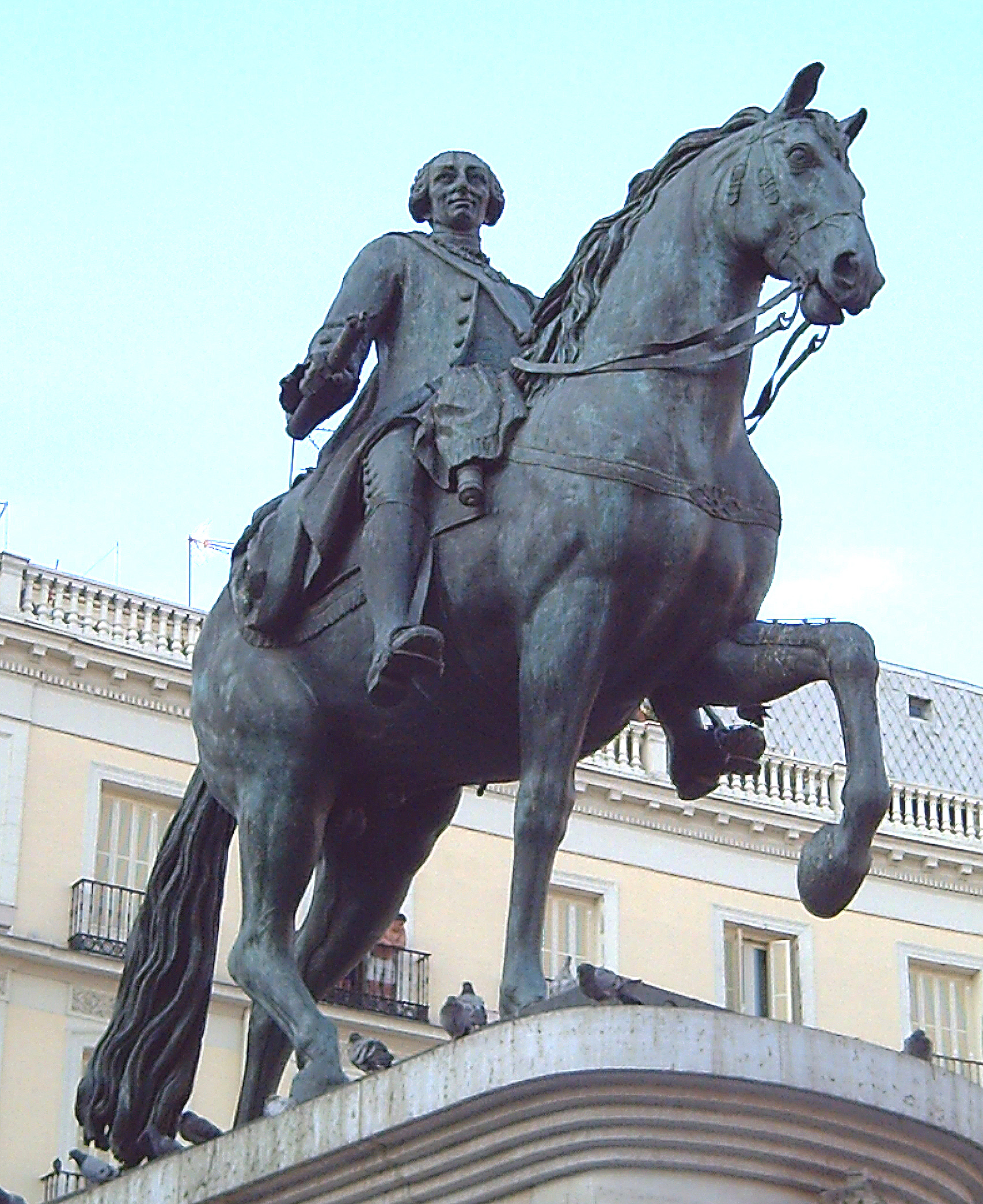
King Charles III

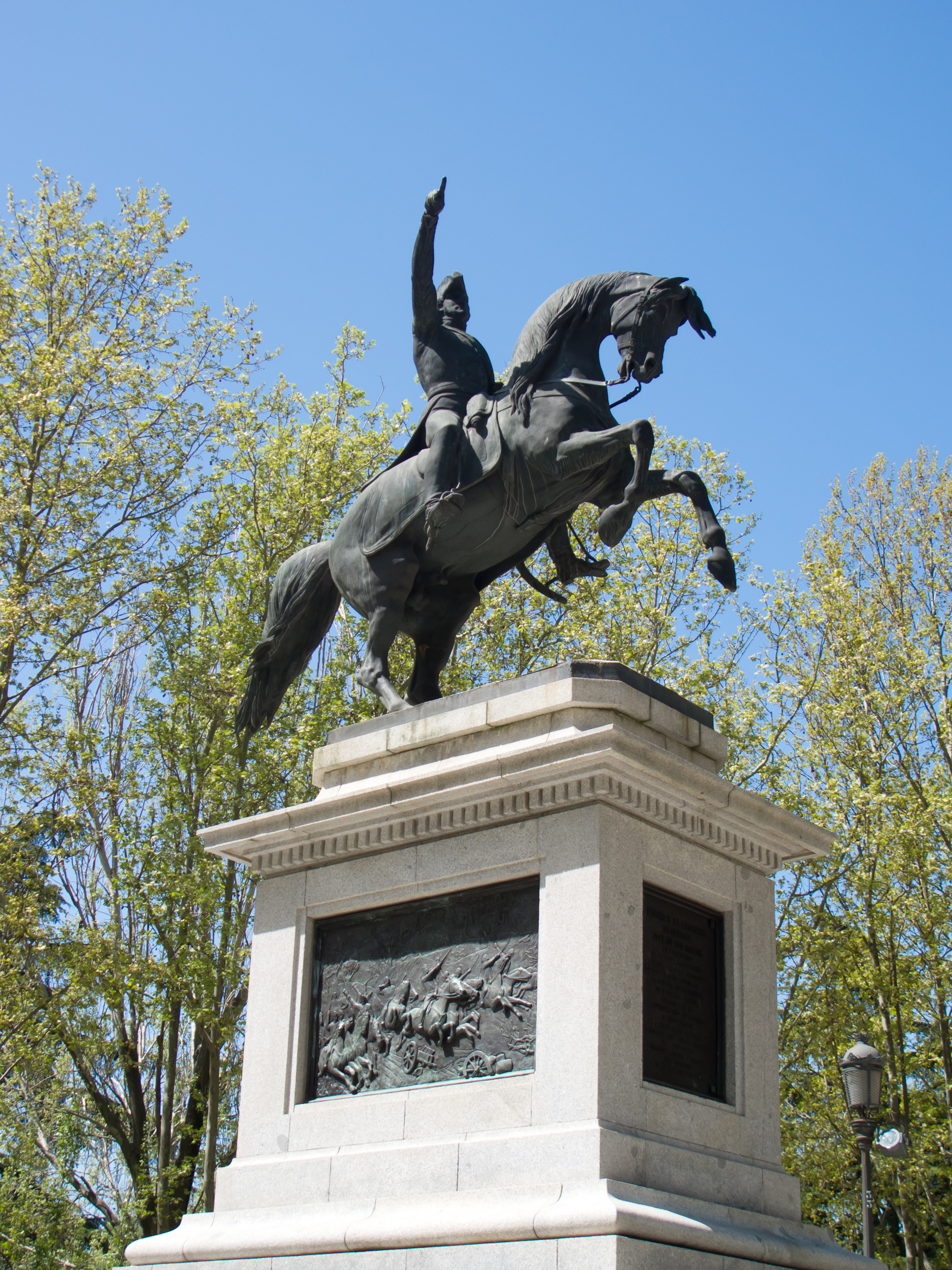
José de San Martín

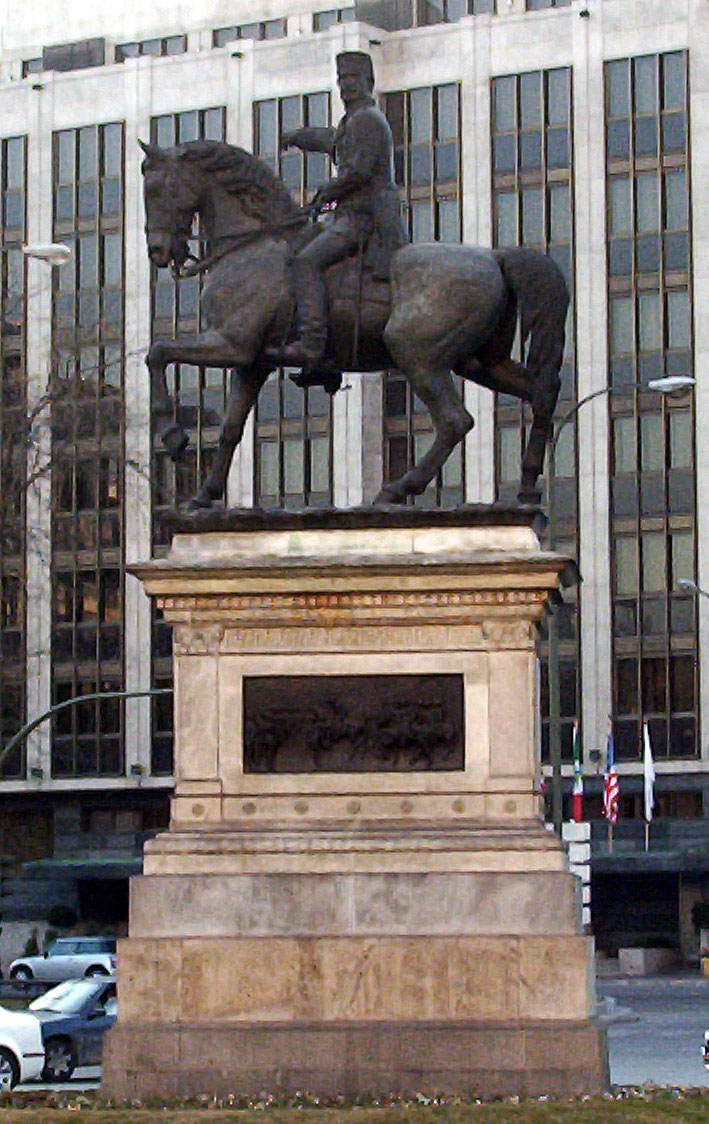
Manuel Gutiérrez de la Concha

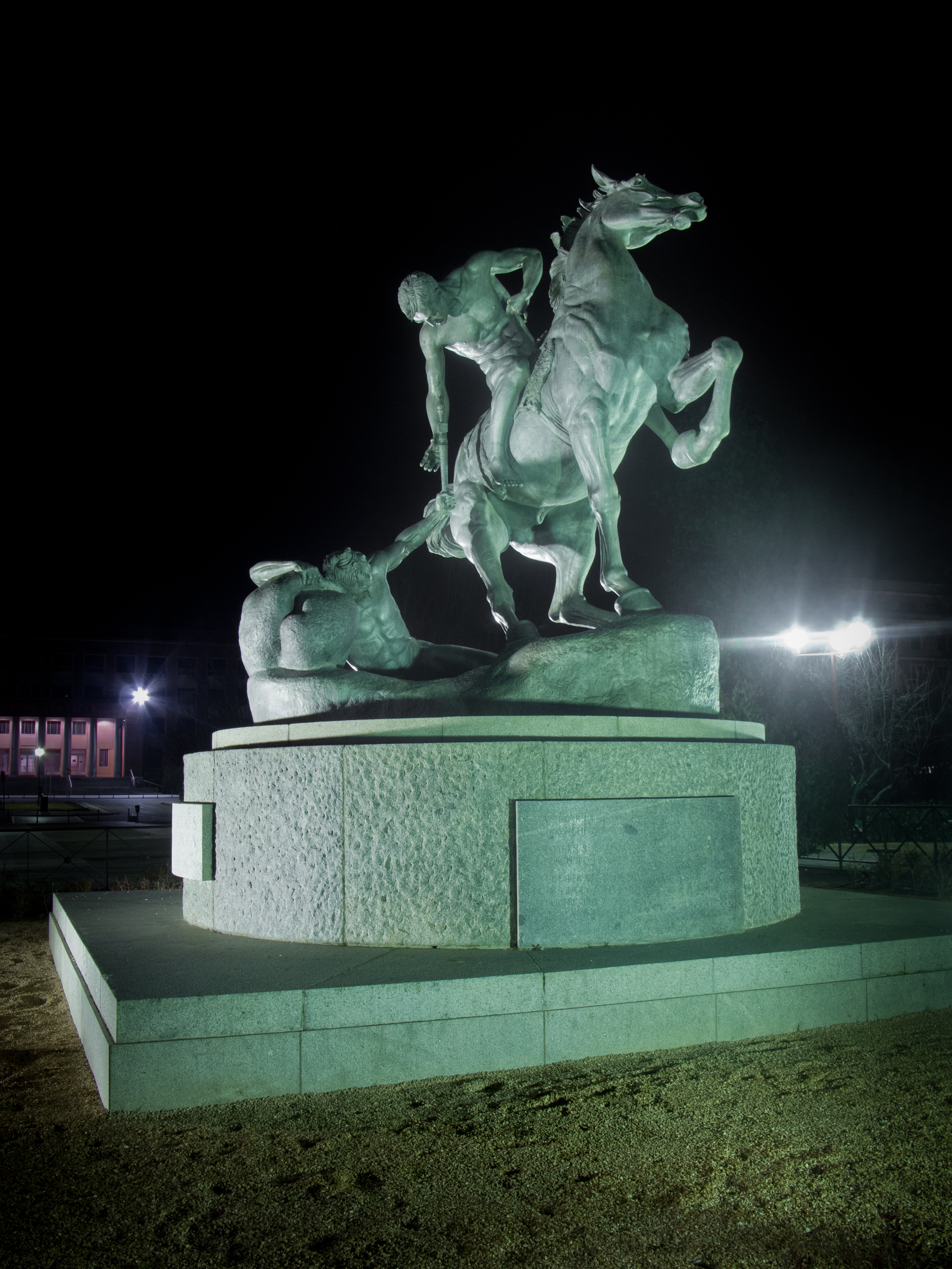
Los Portadores de la Antorcha

== Alcázar de San Juan ==
- Equestrian of Don Quixote and Sancho Panza.
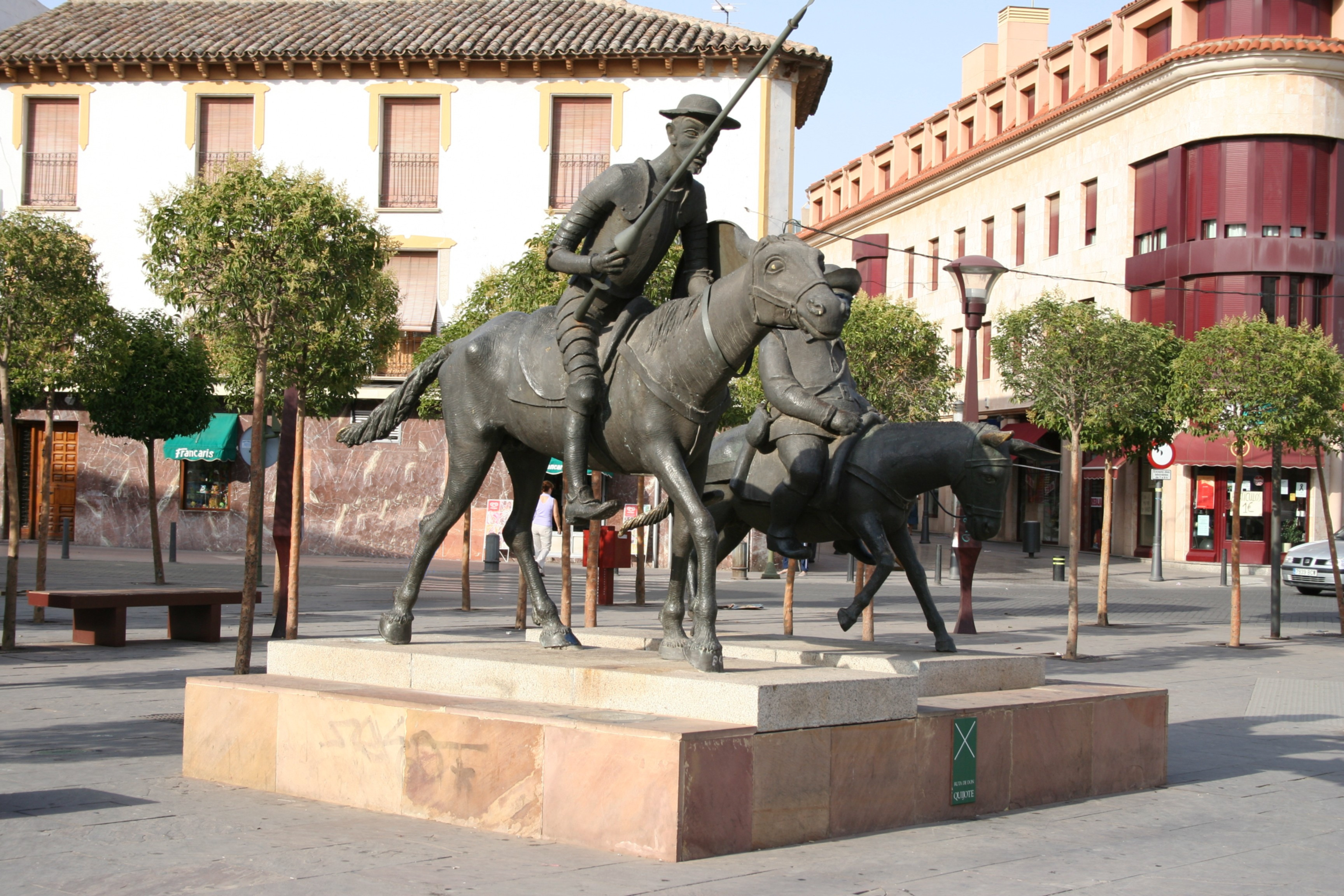
Don Quixote and Sancho Panza in Alcázar de San Juan

== Antequera ==
- Equestrian of King Fernando I in front of the Palacio de Nájera.
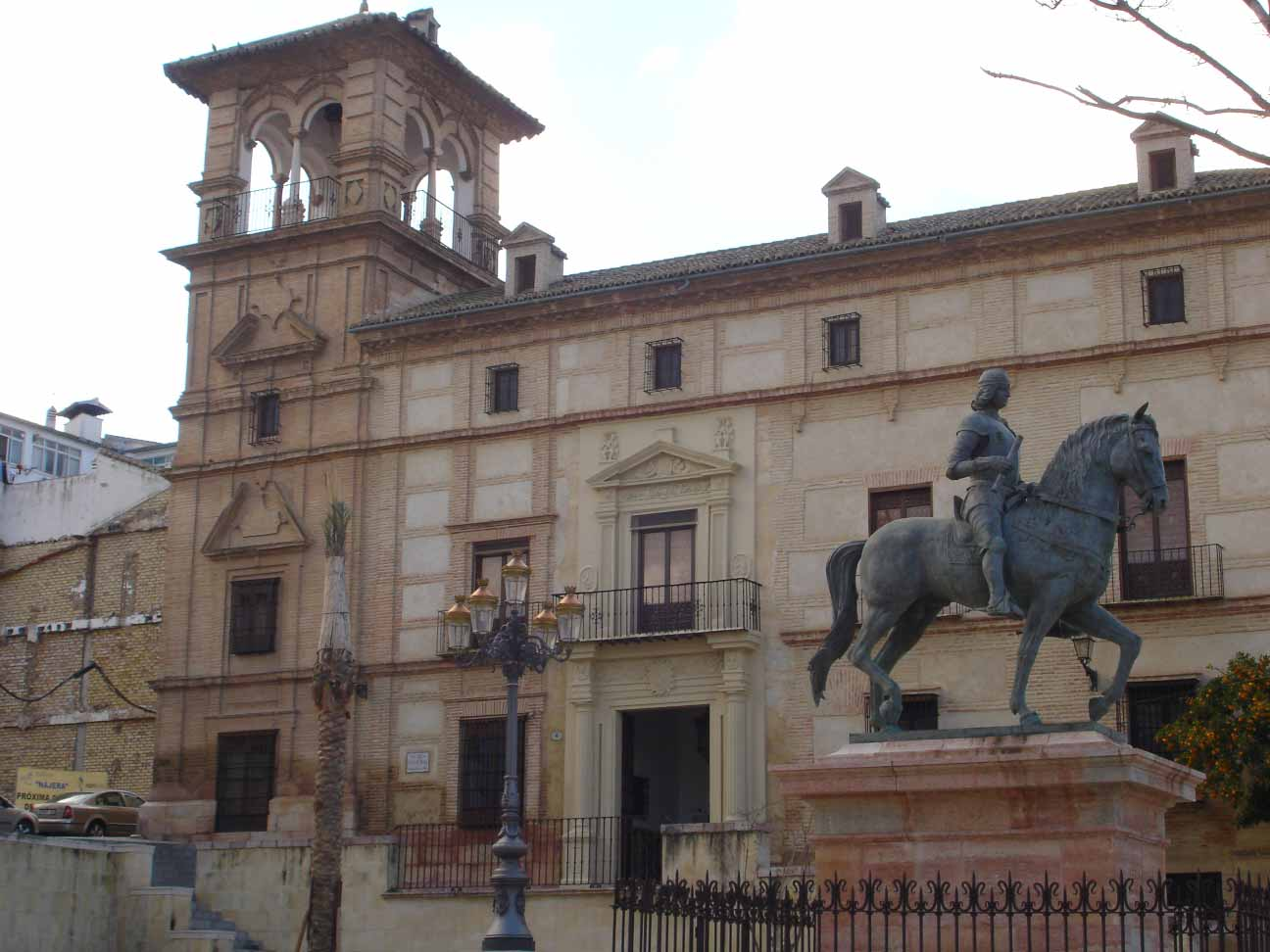
King Fernando I in Antequera

== Badajoz ==
- Equestrian of Hernando de Soto in the Barcarrota.
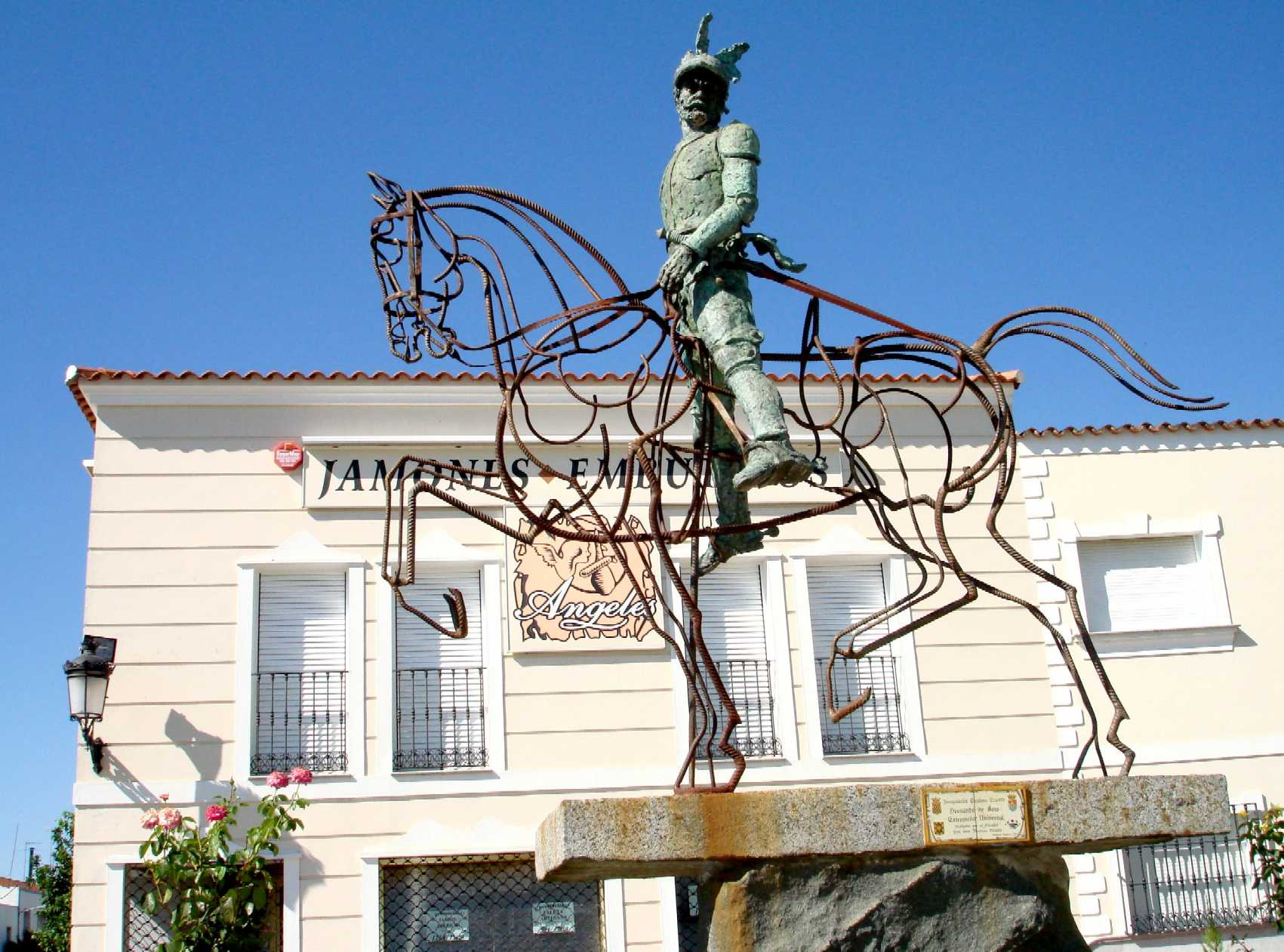
Hernando de Soto in Badajoz

== Barcelona ==
- Saint George killing the dragon by Pere Johan, relief tondo at Palau de la Generalitat ancient façade (1418)
- Saint George by Andreu Aleu, at Palau de la Generalitat façade (1864-1872)
- Monument to General Juan Prim by Lluís Puiggener at Parc de la Ciutadella (1887, restored 1945)
- Equestrian of Count Ramon Berenguer III by Josep Llimona, at Via Laietana, next to the Roman walls (1888)
- Saint James by Manuel Fuxà at Caixa de Barcelona building, Plaça de Sant Jaume (1903)
- Tired Saint George, equestrian statue of Saint George by Josep Llimona at Mirador del Llobregat, Montjuïc (1924)
- Fountain of Saint George and the Dragon by Frederic Galcerà Alabart at the "Pati dels Tarongers" in the Palace of the Generalitat de Catalunya (1926)
- Treball (The Work) and Saviesa (Wisdom) both by Llucià Oslé at Plaça Catalunya (1928)
- Barcelona by Frederic Marès at Plaça Catalunya (1928)
- Olympic horsemen by Pau Gargallo, at Barcelona Olympic Stadium (1928-1929, restored 1991)
- Uranus by Pau Gargallo, at Barcelona City Hall entrance hall (1933, installed 1990)
- Saint George on the cloister fountain, by Emili Colom, at the Cathedral (1970)
- Longinus riding by Josep Maria Subirachs at Sagrada Família Passion Façade (1996)
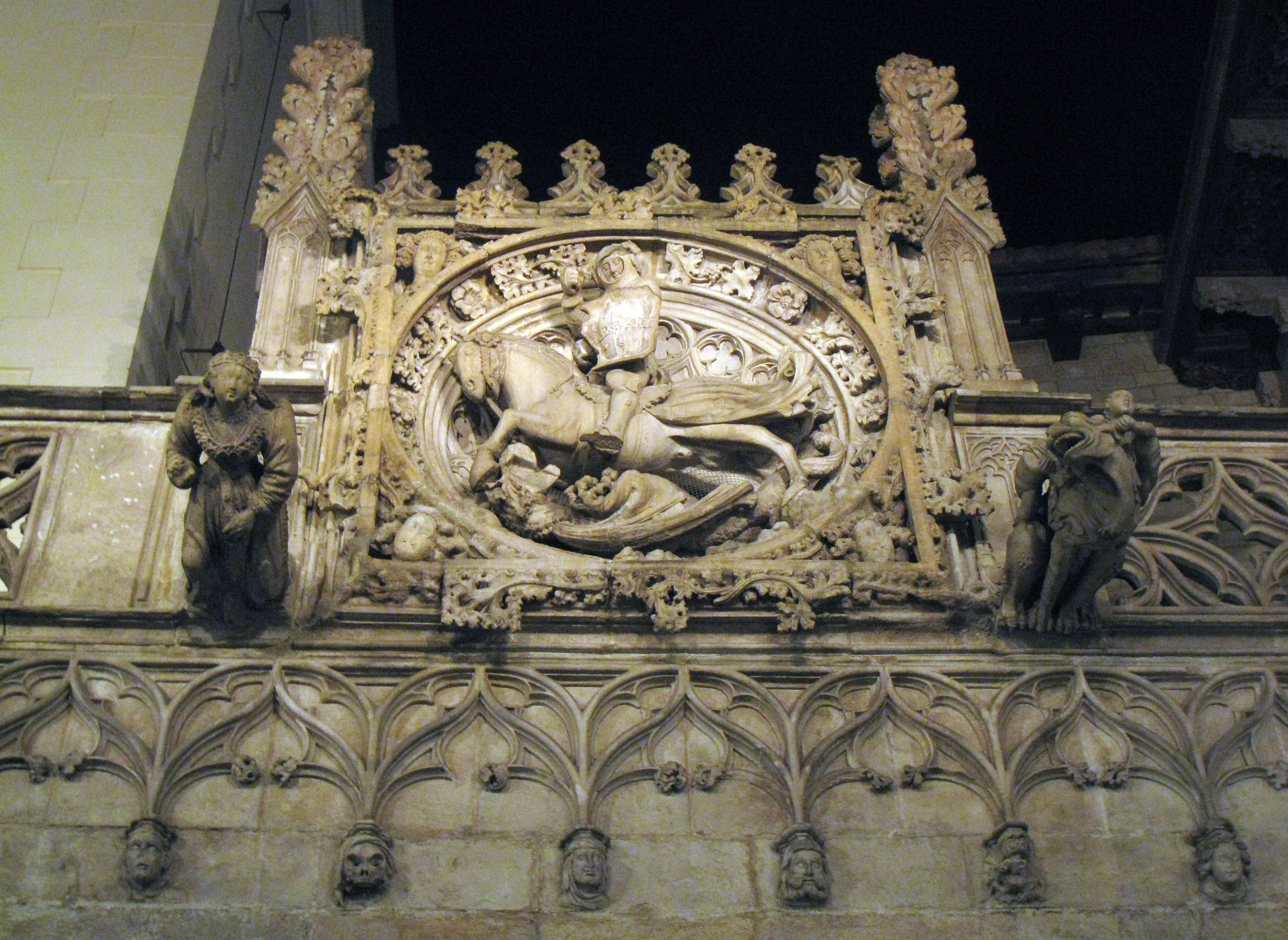
Pere Joan's Saint George

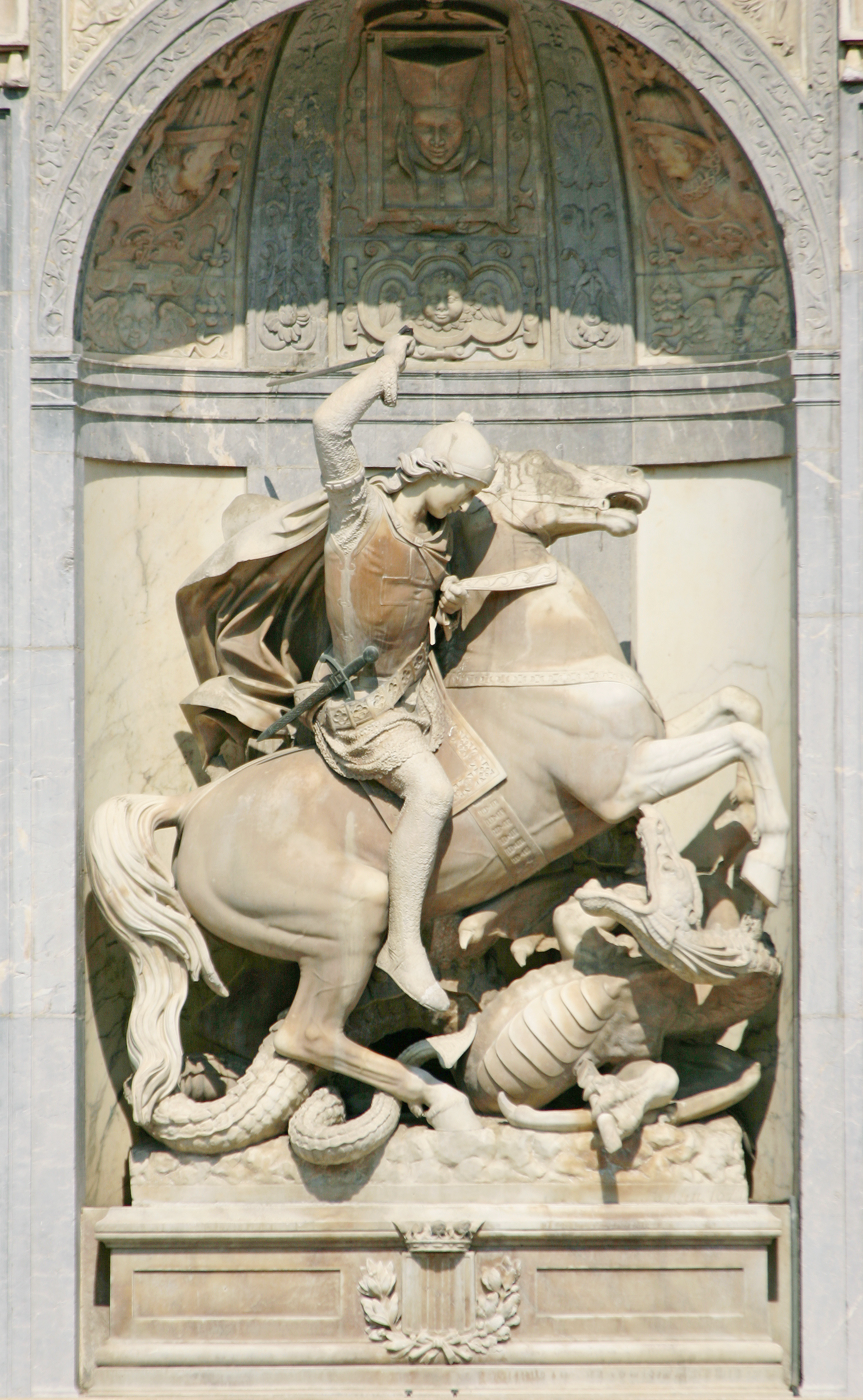
Andreu Aleu's Saint George at Palau de la Generalitat

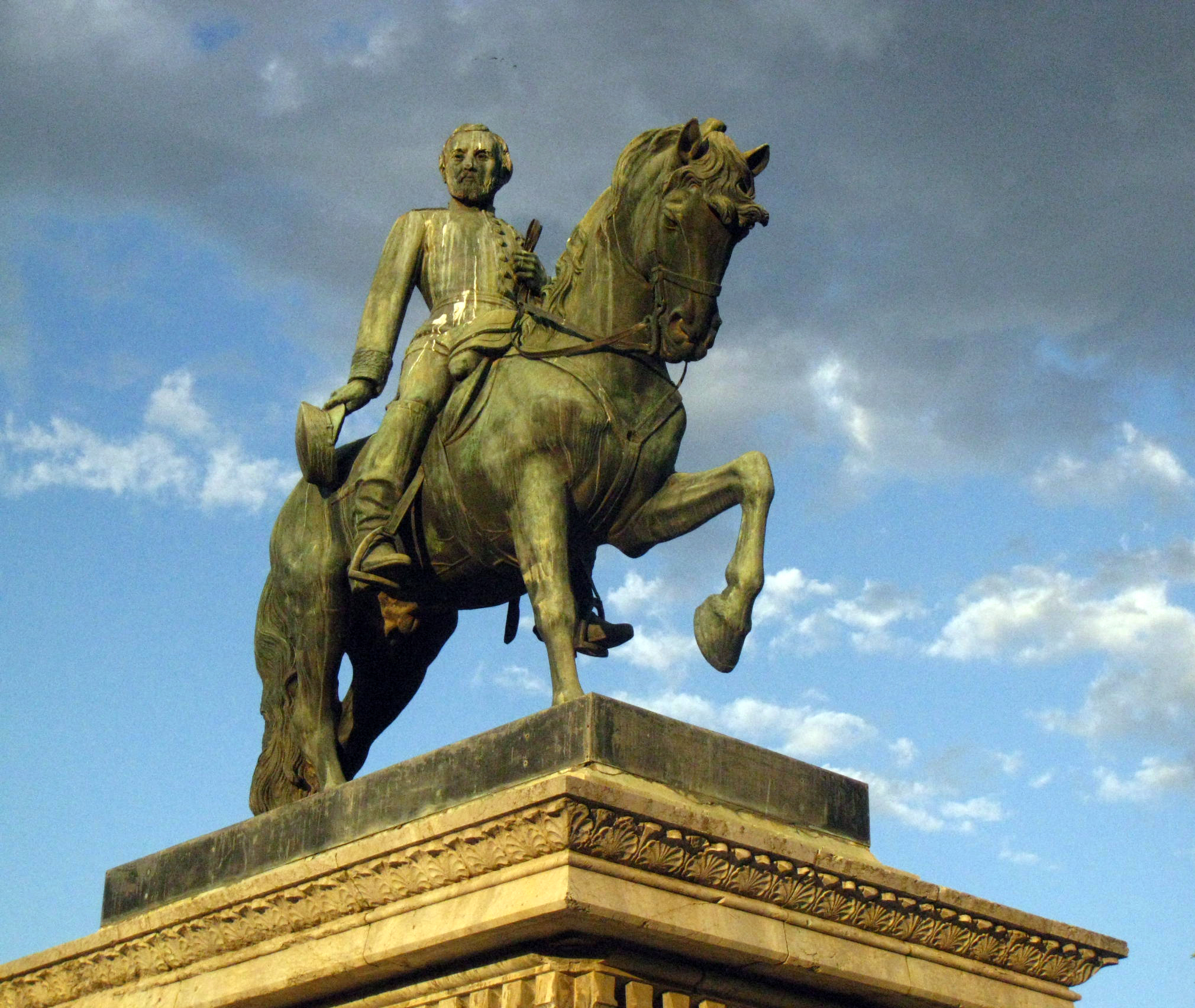
General Juan Prim at Parc de la Ciutadella

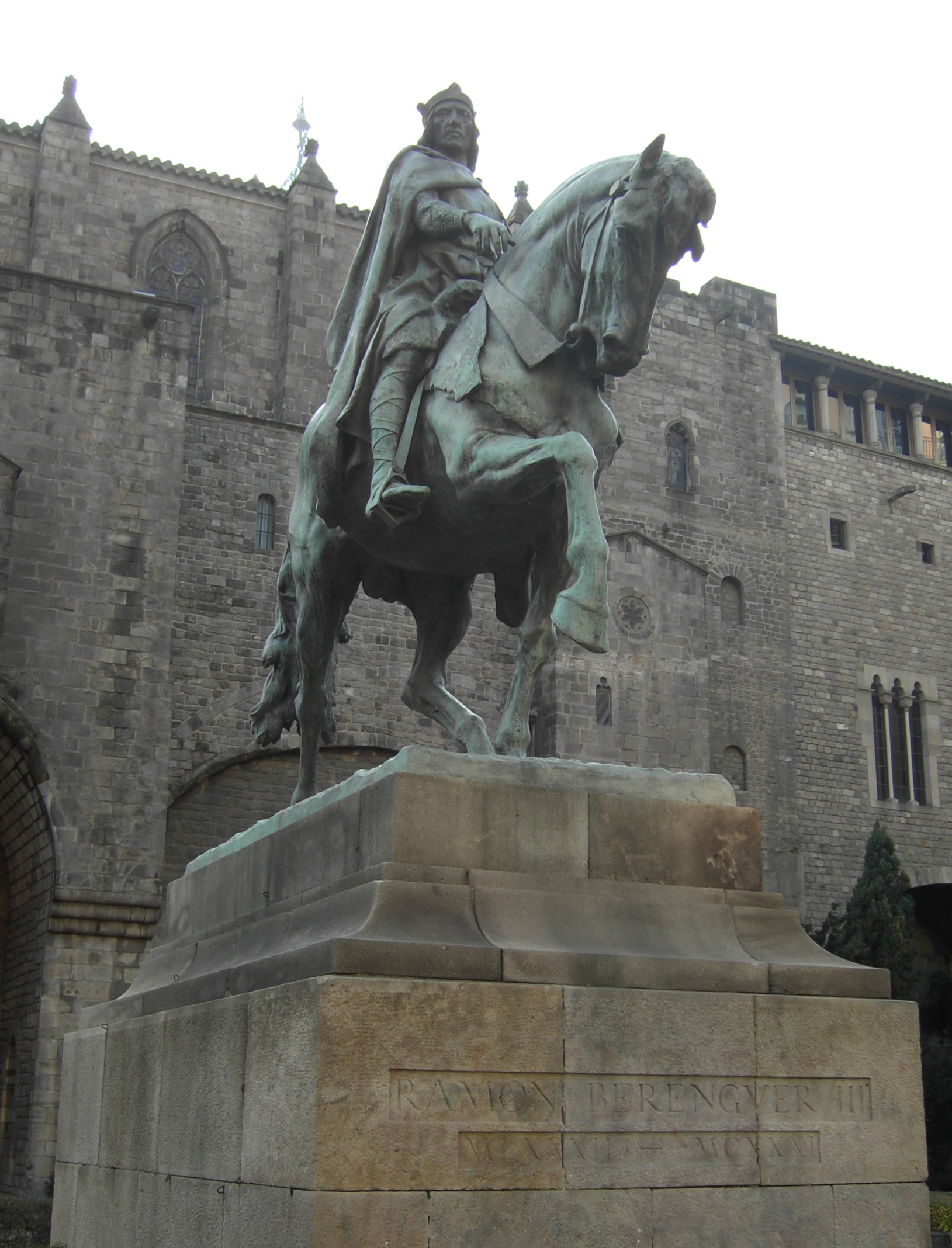
Count Ramon Berenguer III

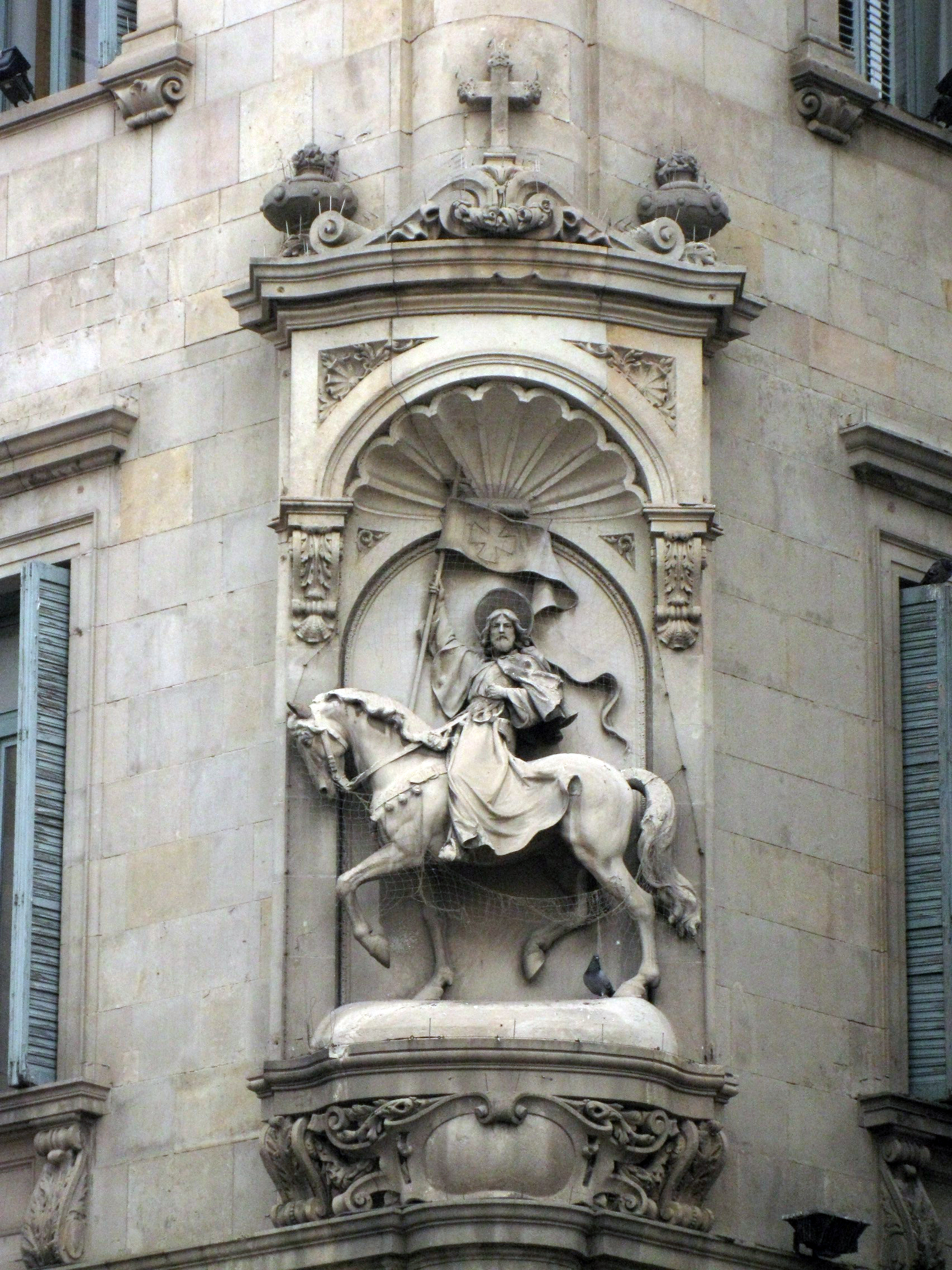
Saint James at Plaça de Sant Jaume

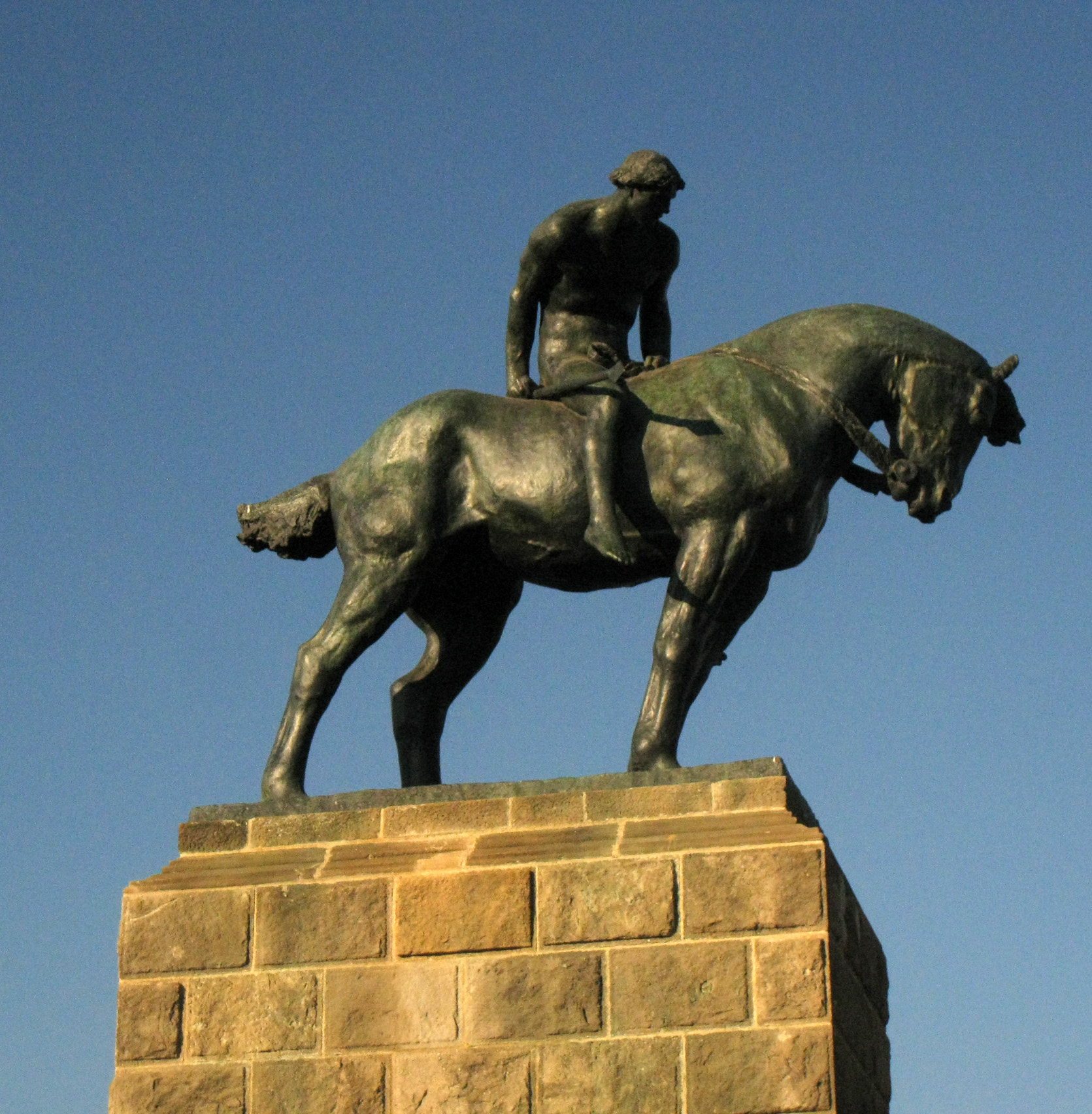
Tired Saint George at Montjuïc

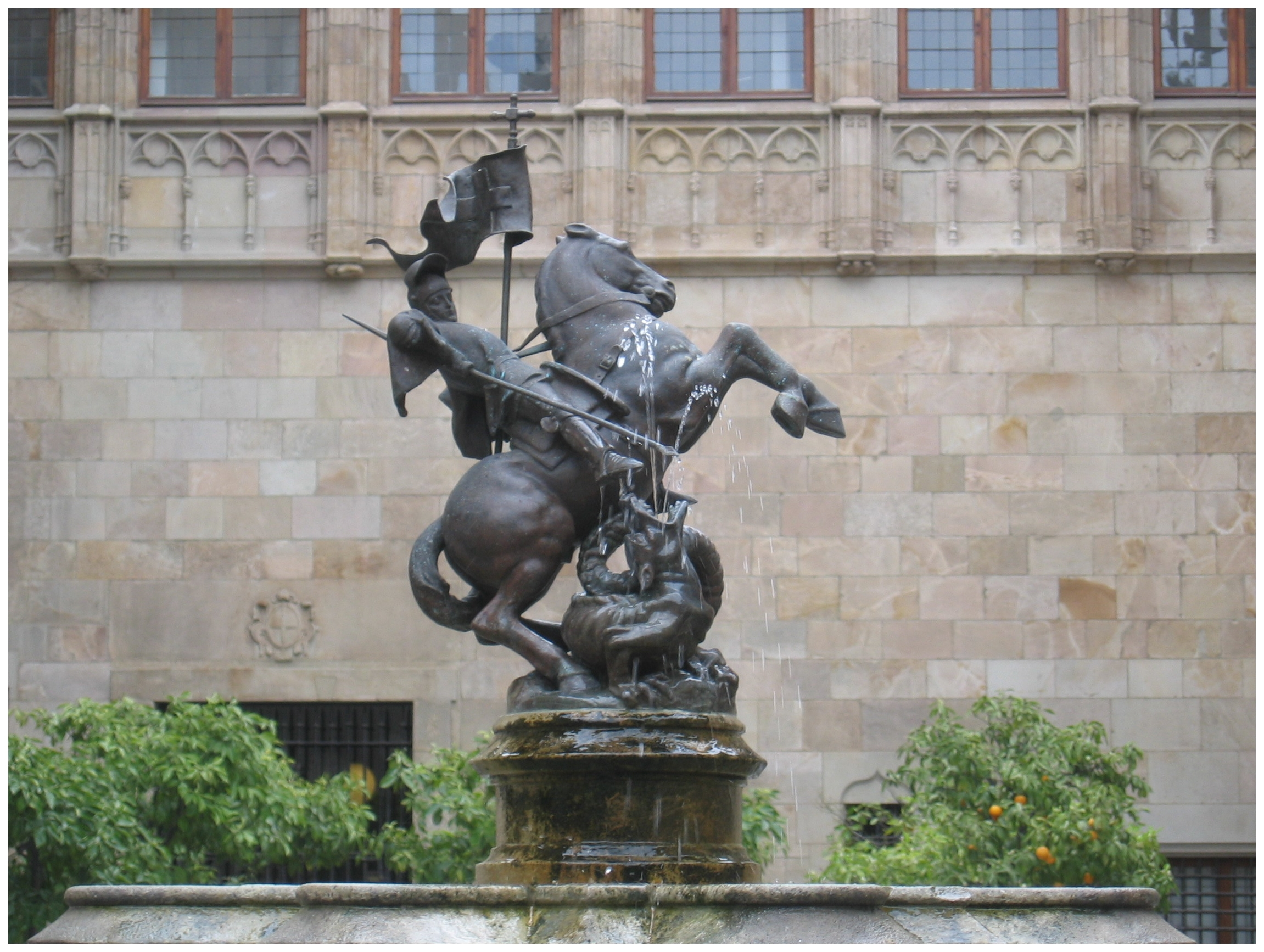
Fountain of Saint George and the Dragon at the Palace of the Generalitat de Catalunya

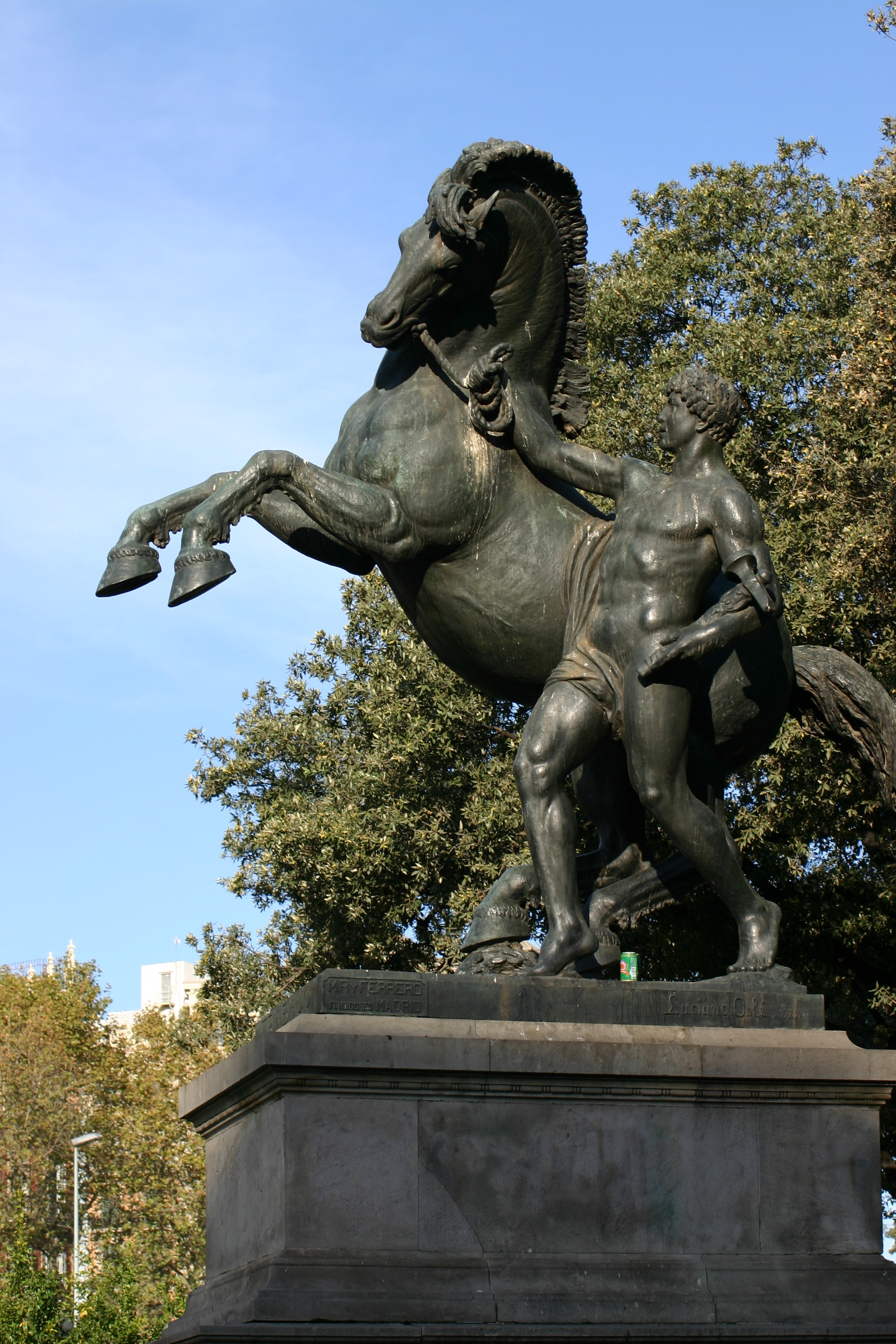
The Work by Llucià Oslé at Plaça de Catalunya

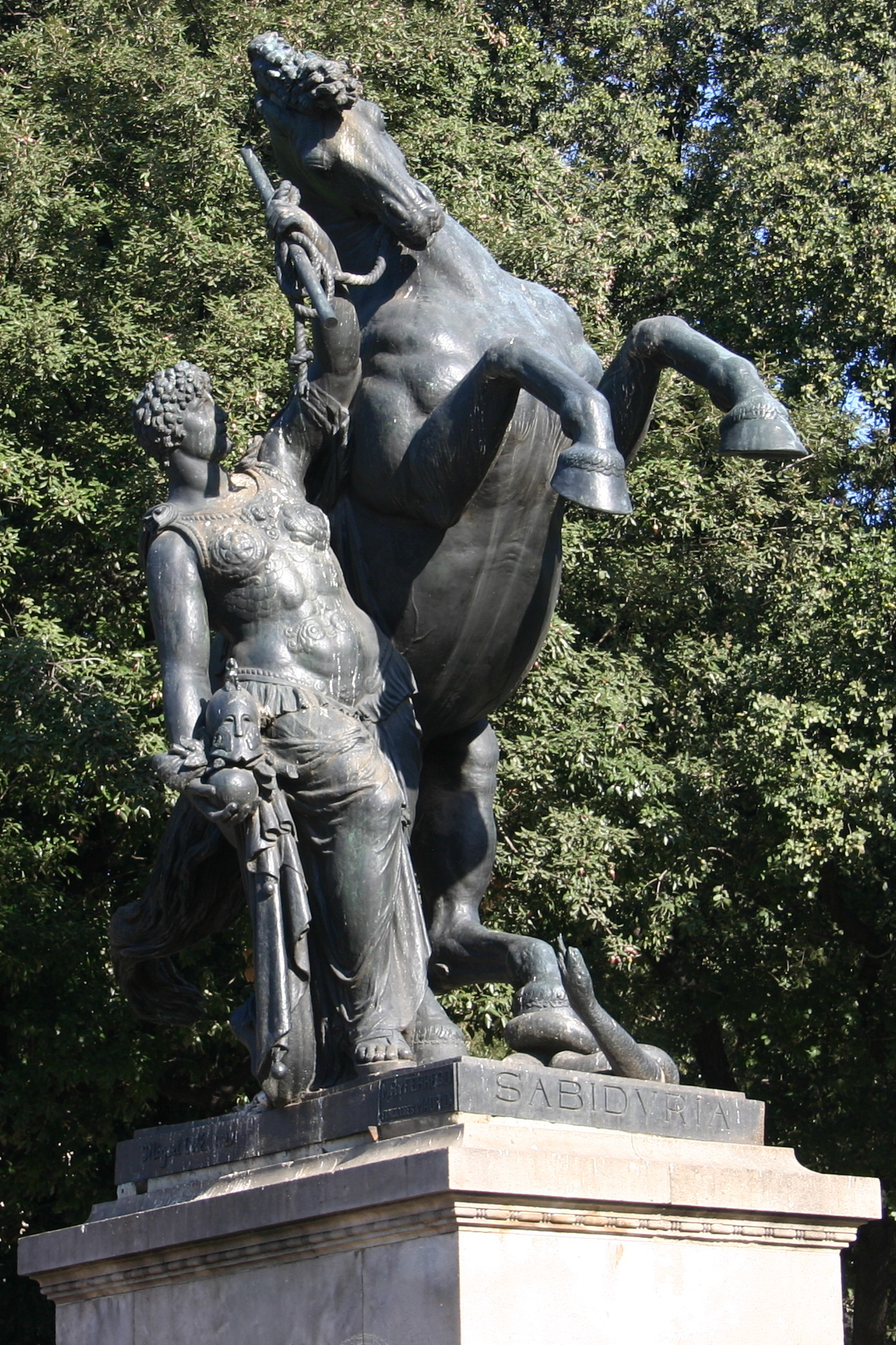
Wisedom by Llucià Oslé at Plaça de Catalunya

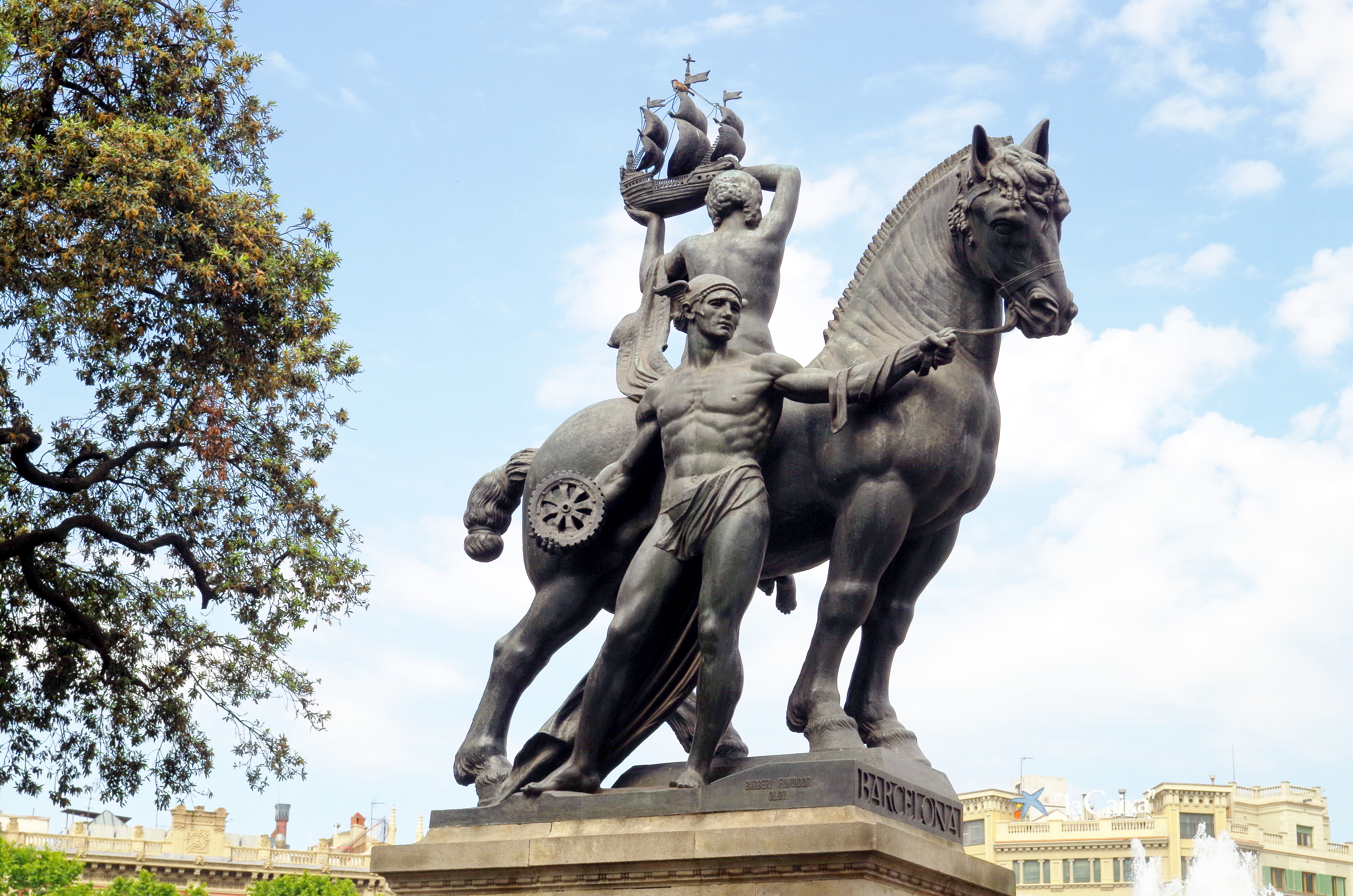
Barcelona by Frederic Marès at Plaça de Catalunya

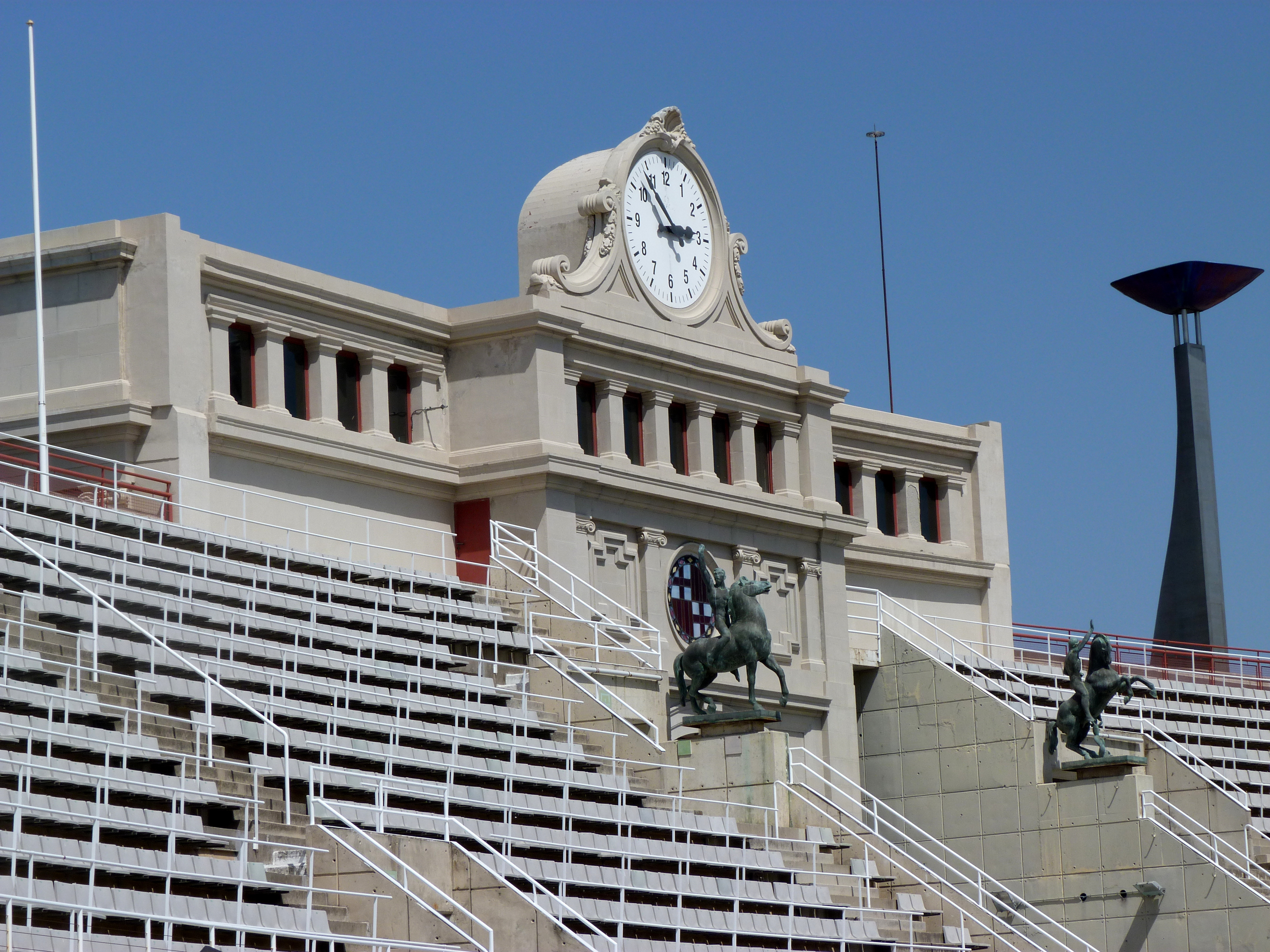
Olympic horsemen at Barcelona Stadium

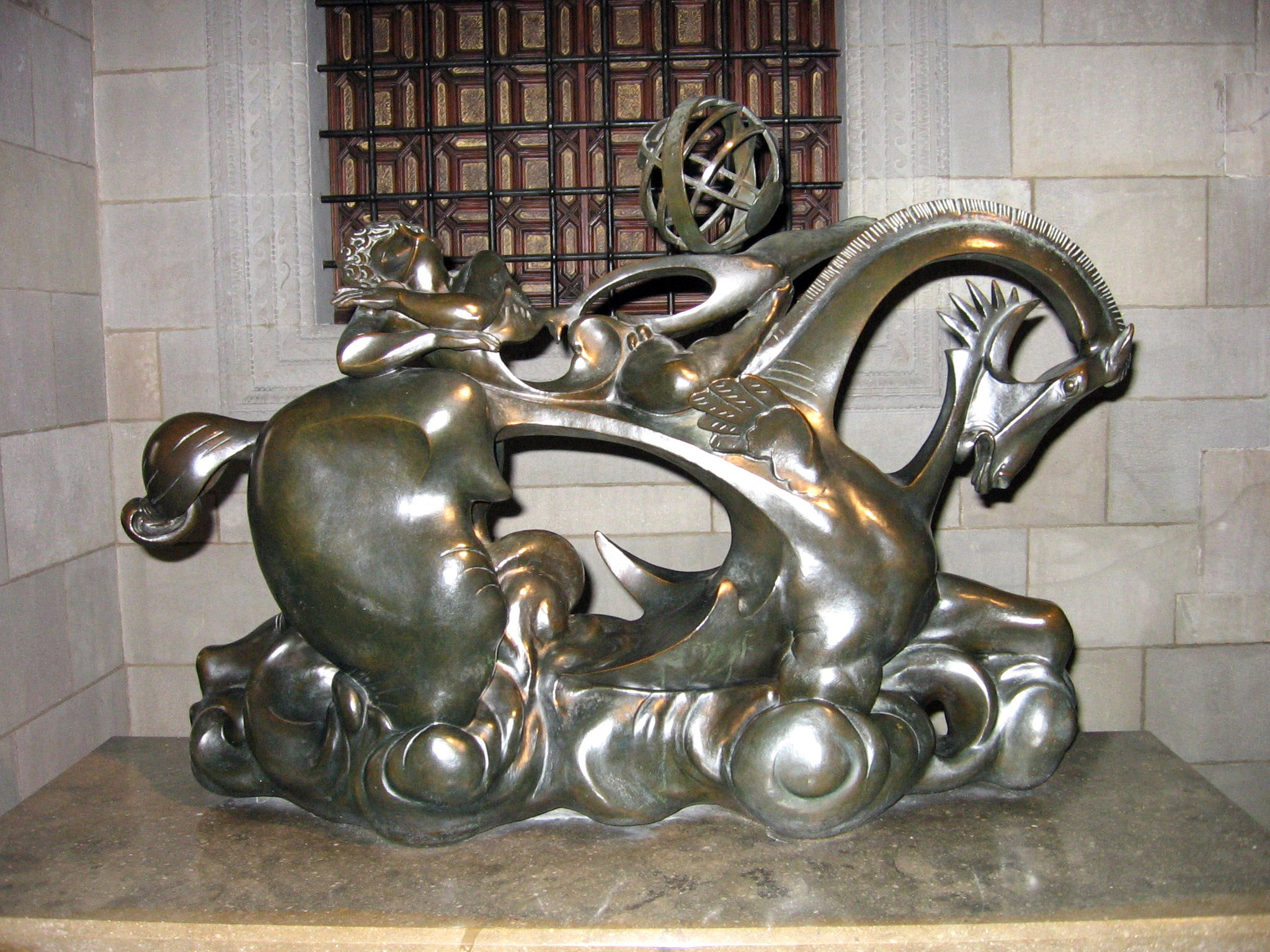
Uranus by Gargallo

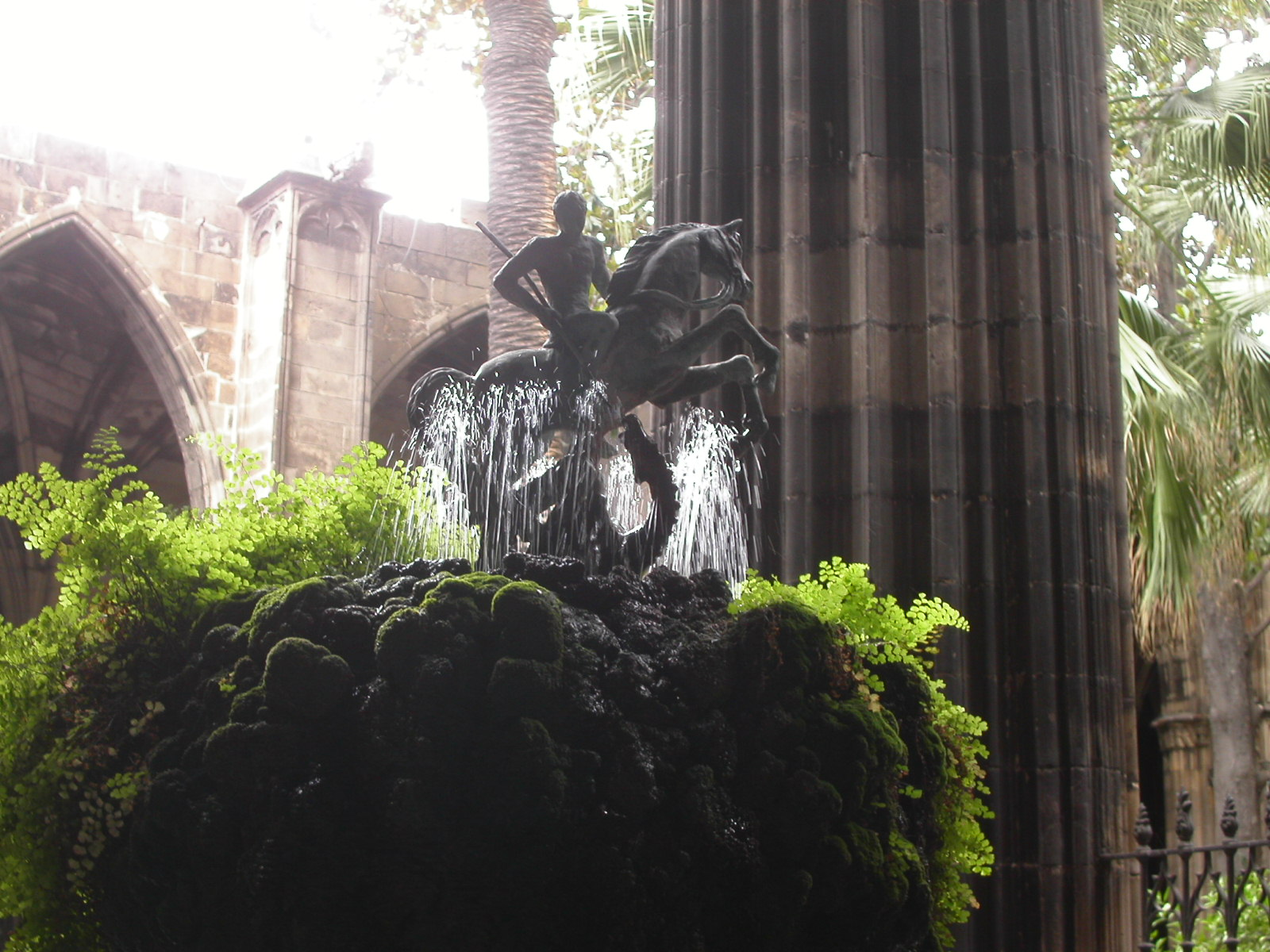
Saint George on the Cathedral fountain

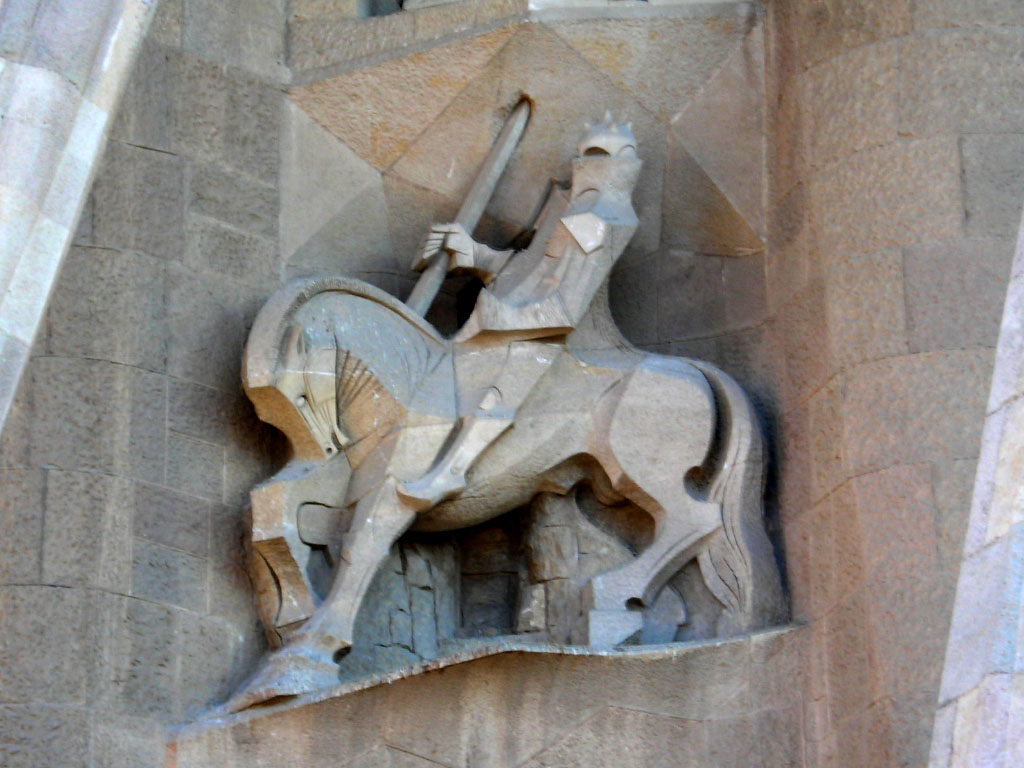
Longinus by Subirachs, at Sagrada Familia

== Burgos ==
- Equestrian of El Cid Campeador outside the entrance of the Burgos Cathedral.
- Equestrian of Count Diego Rodríguez Porcelos, by Juan de Ávalos at Plaza de Santa Teresa (1983, in the present place since 2011)
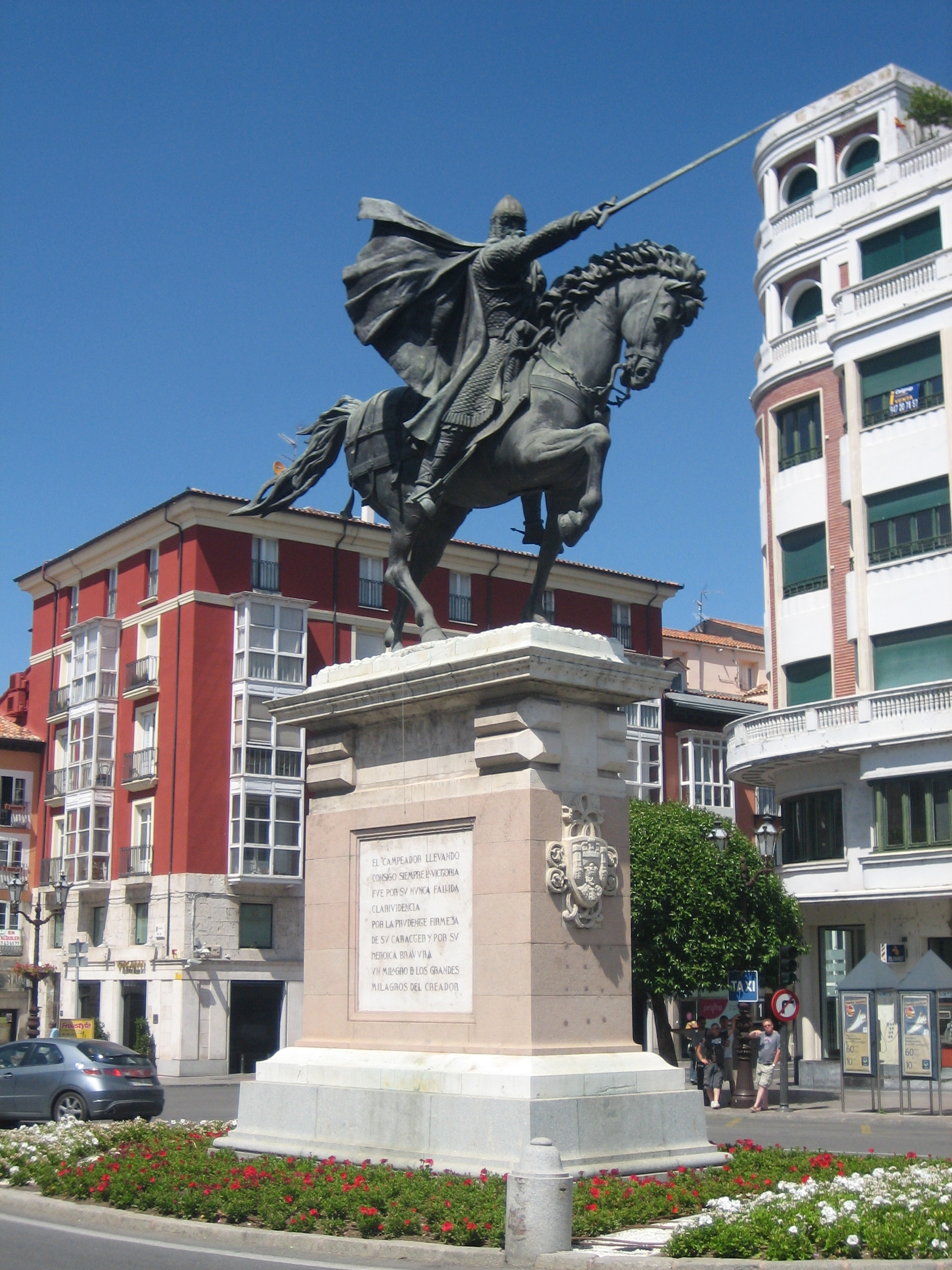
El Cid outside Burgos Cathedral

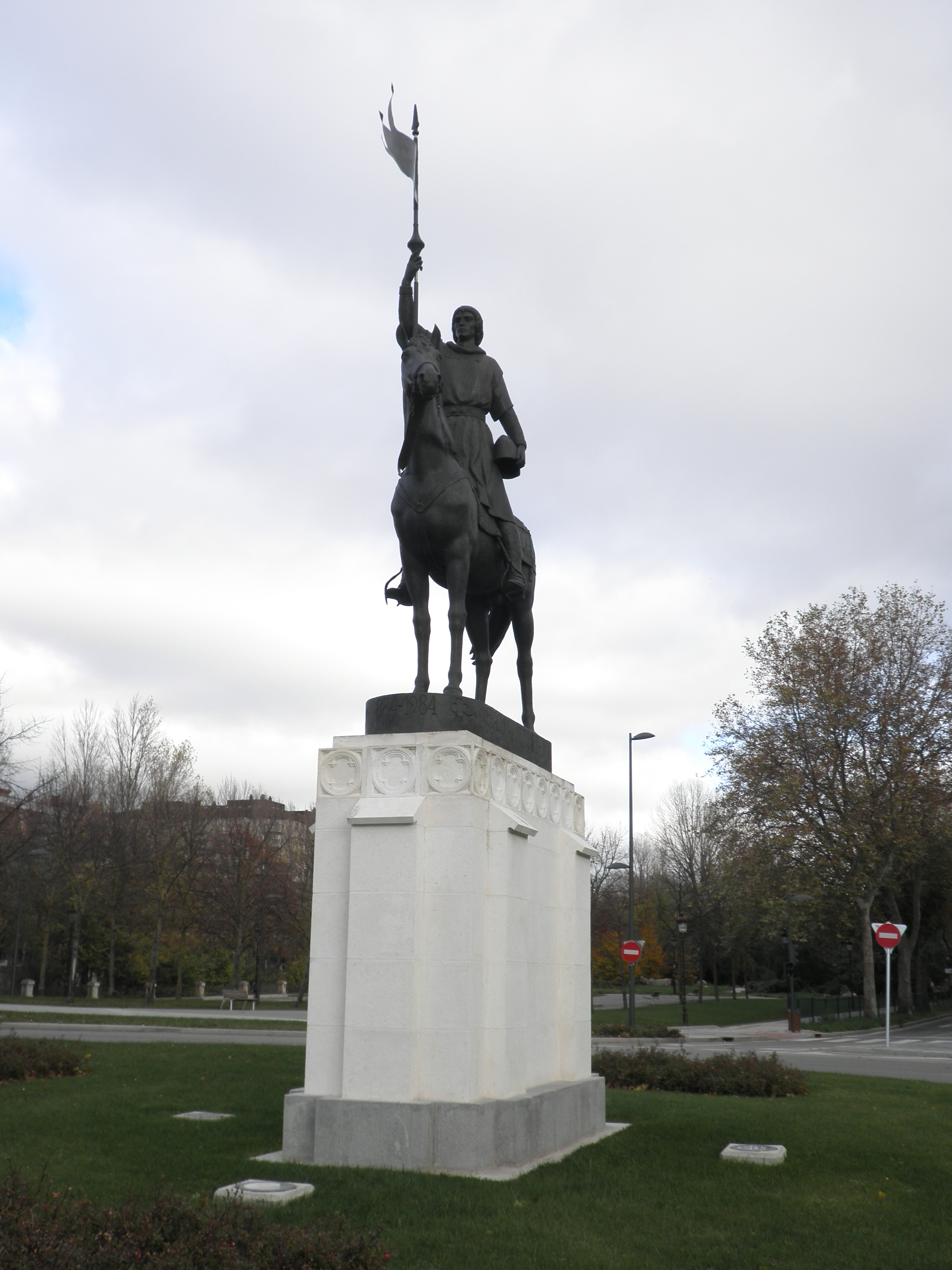
Diego Porcelos' statue

== Cádiz ==
- Equestrian of Simón Bolívar.
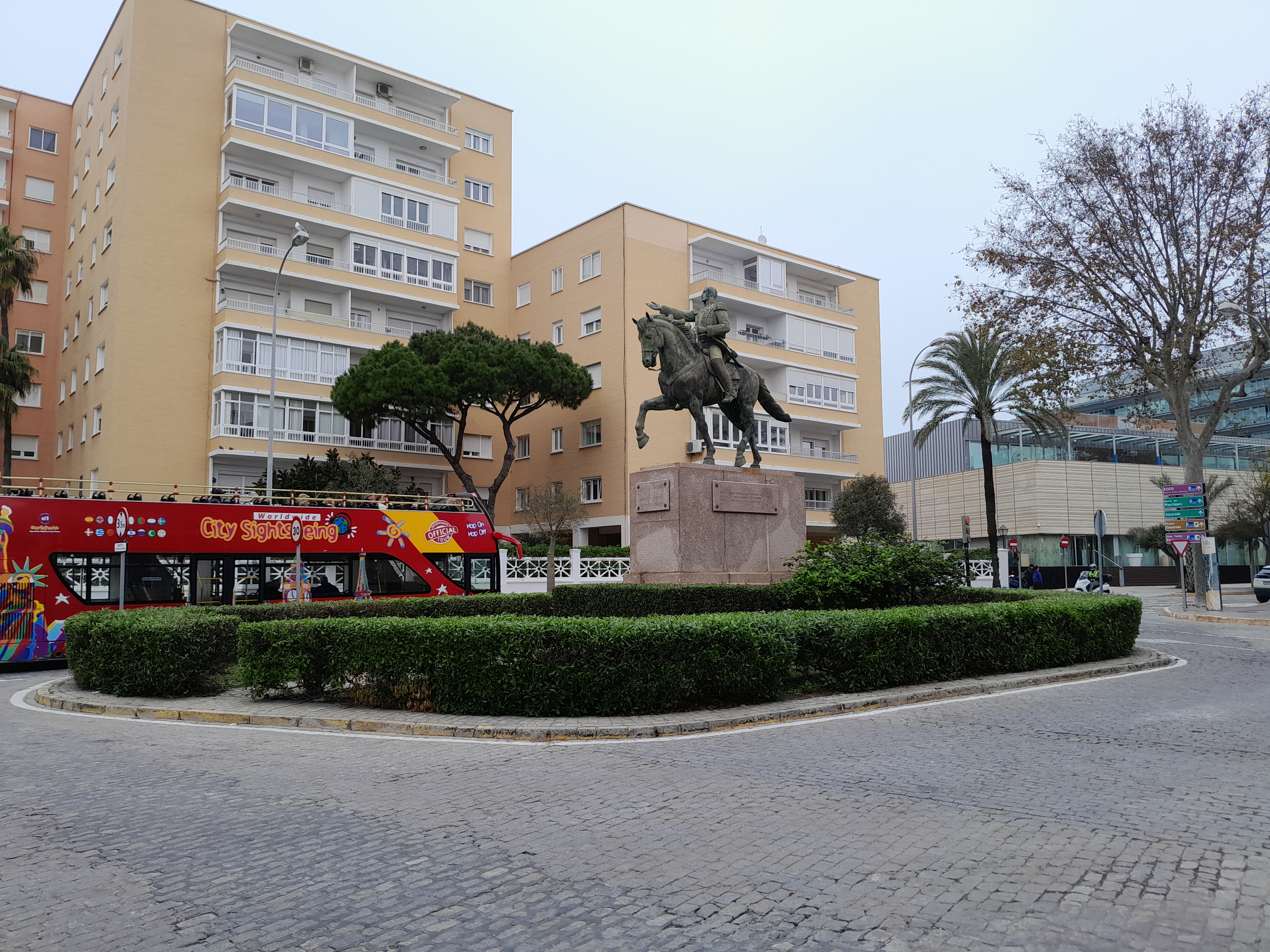
Simón Bolívar

== Cardona ==
- Equestrian statue of Count Borrell II of Barcelona, by Josep Maria Subirachs (1986)

== Córdoba ==
- Equestrian of General Gonzalo de Córdoba, (Gran Capitán), by Mateo Inurria, 1923. The head is a portrait of El Lagartijo, a famous bullfighter.
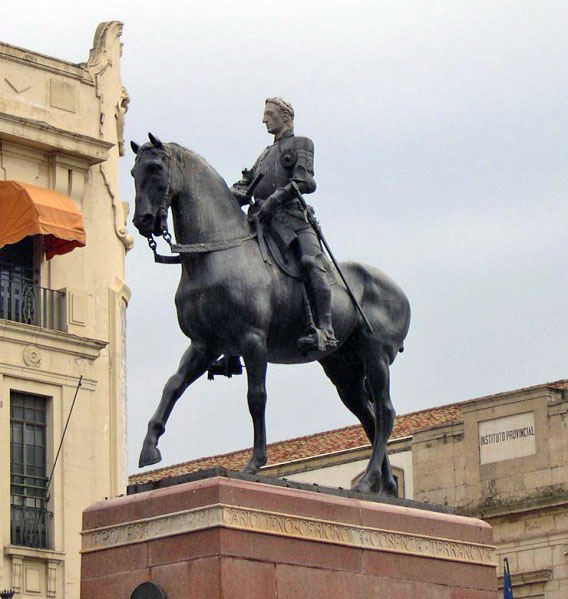
General Gonzalo de Córdoba in Córdoba

== Cuenca ==
- Equestrian of King Alfonso VIII of Castile, by Javier Barrios, 2010. Plaza Obispo Valero, next to the Cathedral
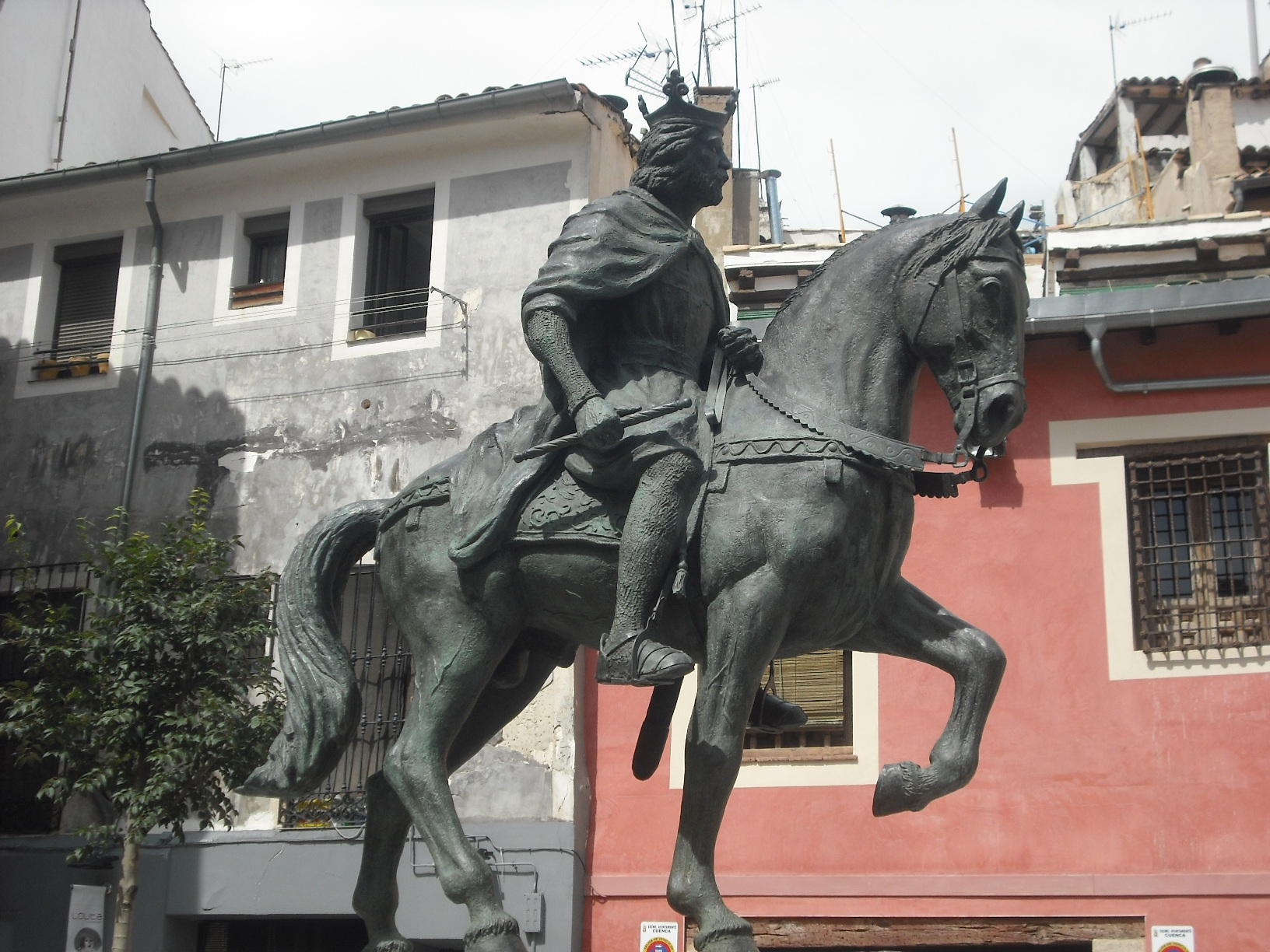
King Alfonso VIII of Castile in Cuenca

== Jerez de la Frontera ==
- Equestrian of Miguel Primo de Rivera at the Plaza del Arenal.
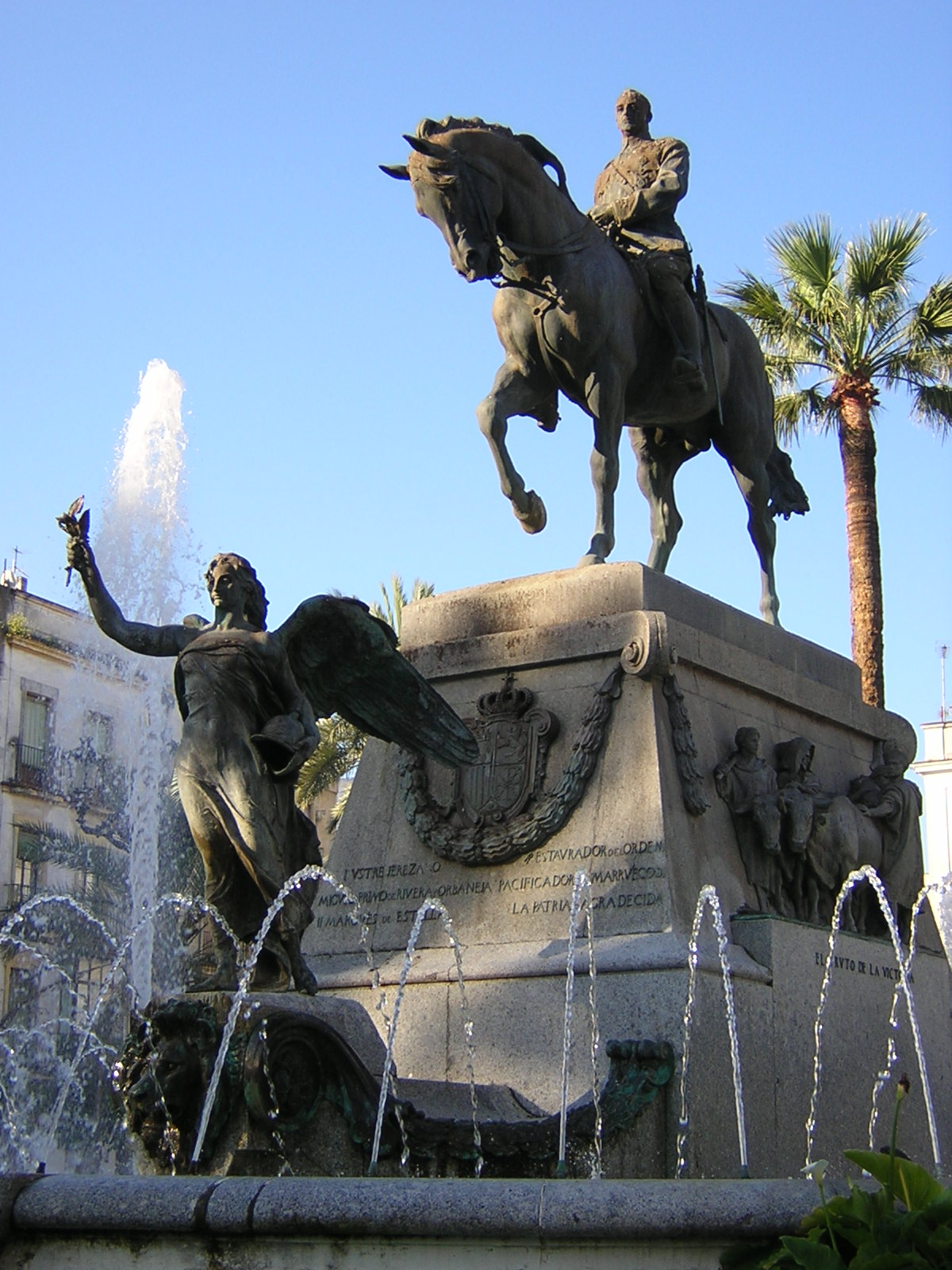
Miguel Primo de Rivera at the Plaza del Arenal

== Logroño ==
- Equestrian of Baldomero Espartero at the Paseo del Príncipe de Vergara Plaza.
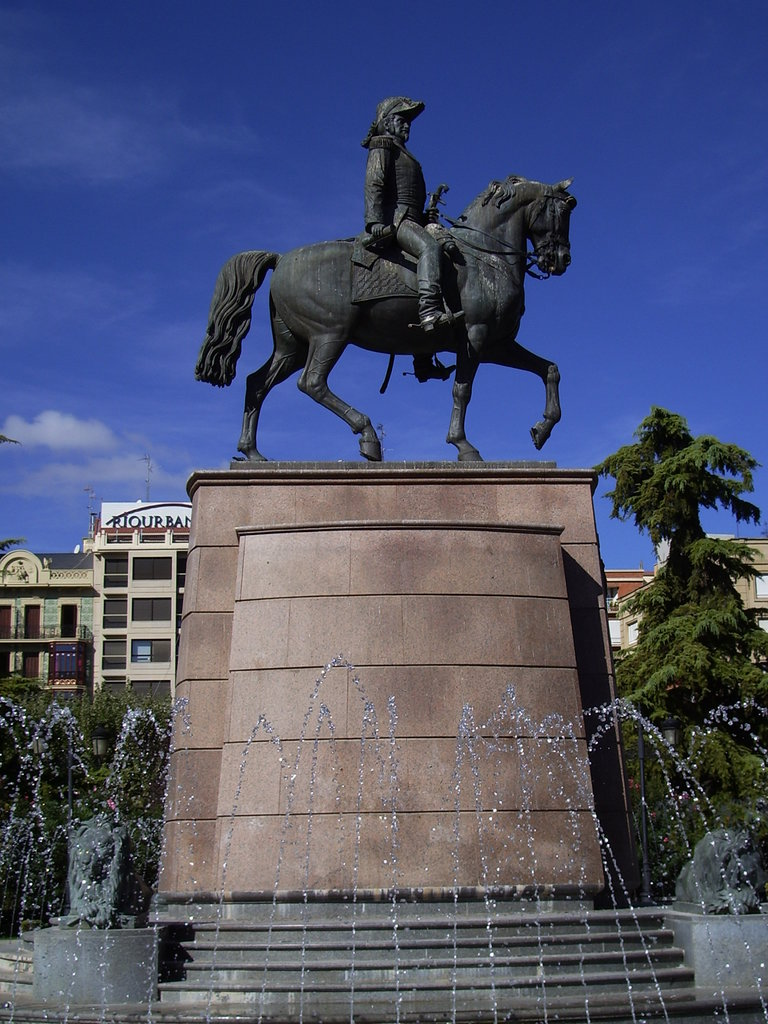
Baldomero Espartero at Paseo del Príncipe de Vergara Plaza

== Merida ==
- Equestrian of Augustus
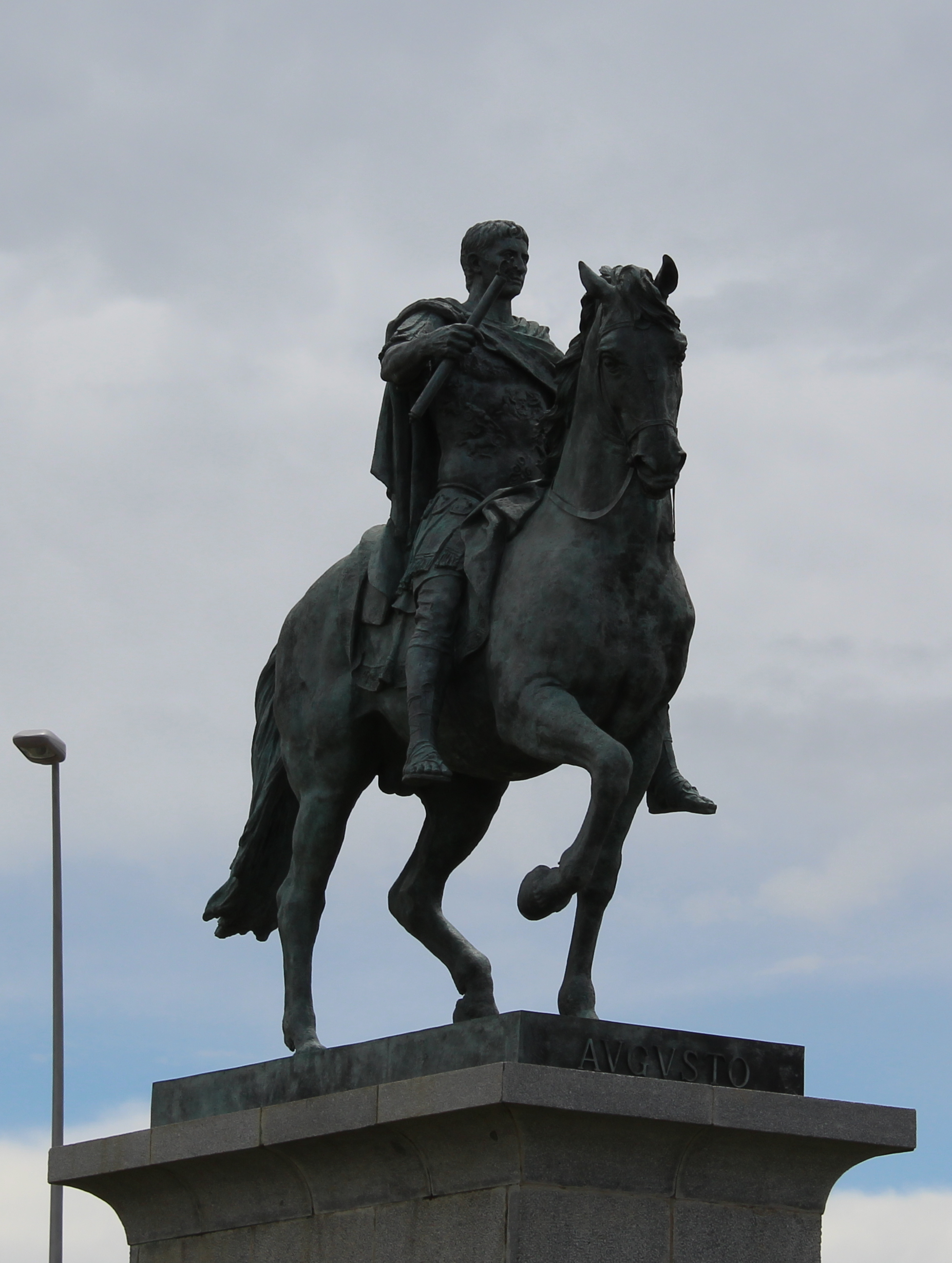
  Equestrian statue of Augustus in Mérida by Eduardo Zancada, inaugurated in 2007.
- Equestrian statue of Marcus Vipsanius Agrippa by Eduardo Zancada, erected in 2007.

== Morella ==
- Equestrian statue of Ramón Cabrera at Castell de Morella
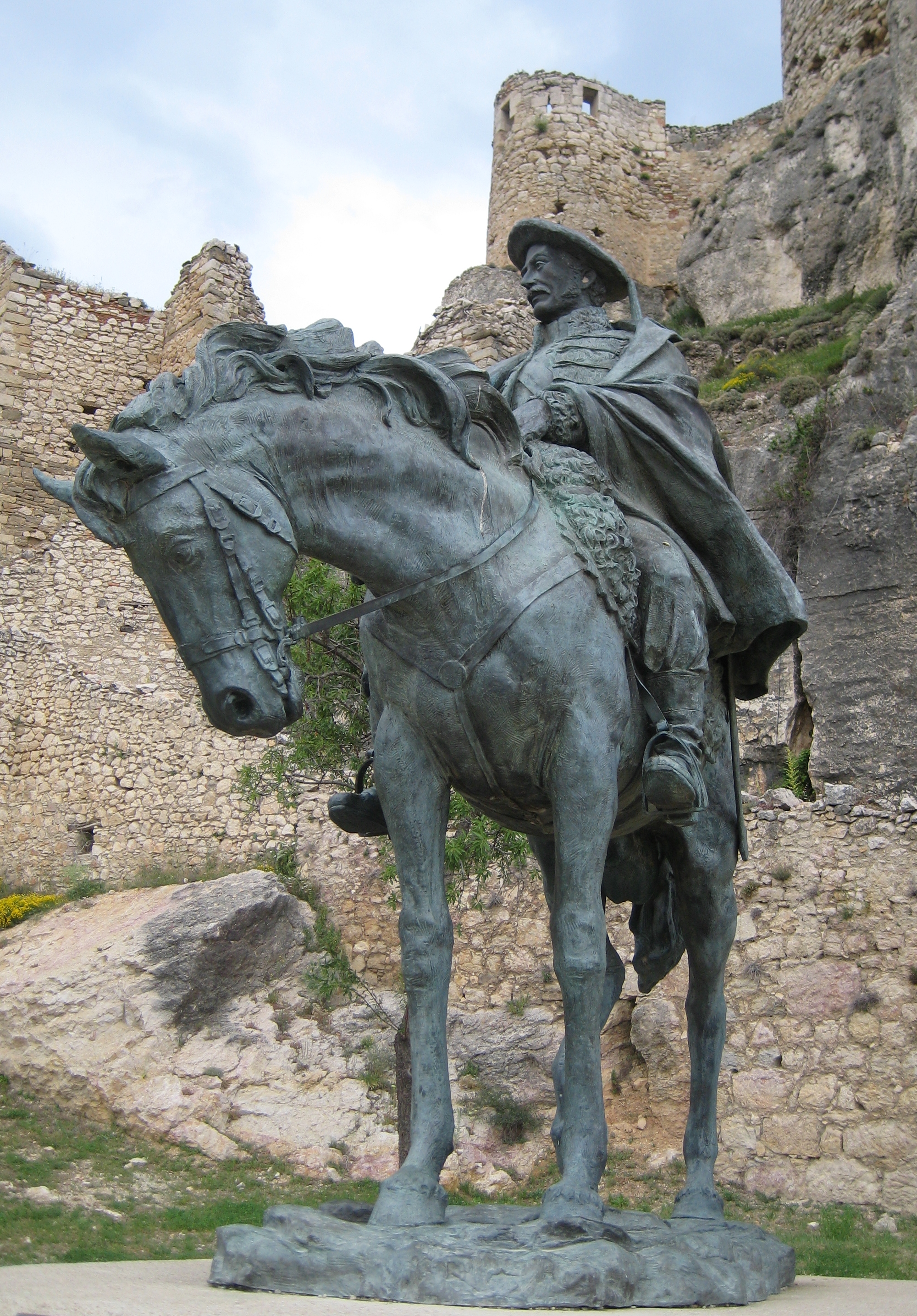
Ramón Cabrera at Castell de Morella

== Reus ==
- Equestrian of General Juan Prim by Lluís Puiggener at the Plaça de Prim, 1891.
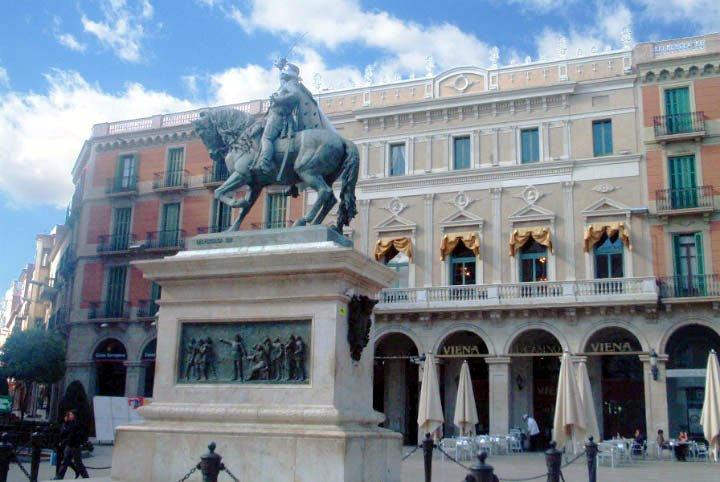
General Juan Prim at Plaça de Prim

== Sant Joan de les Abadesses ==
- Fountain of Comte Arnau by Josep Camps at the Plaça d'Anselm Clavé (ca. 1920).
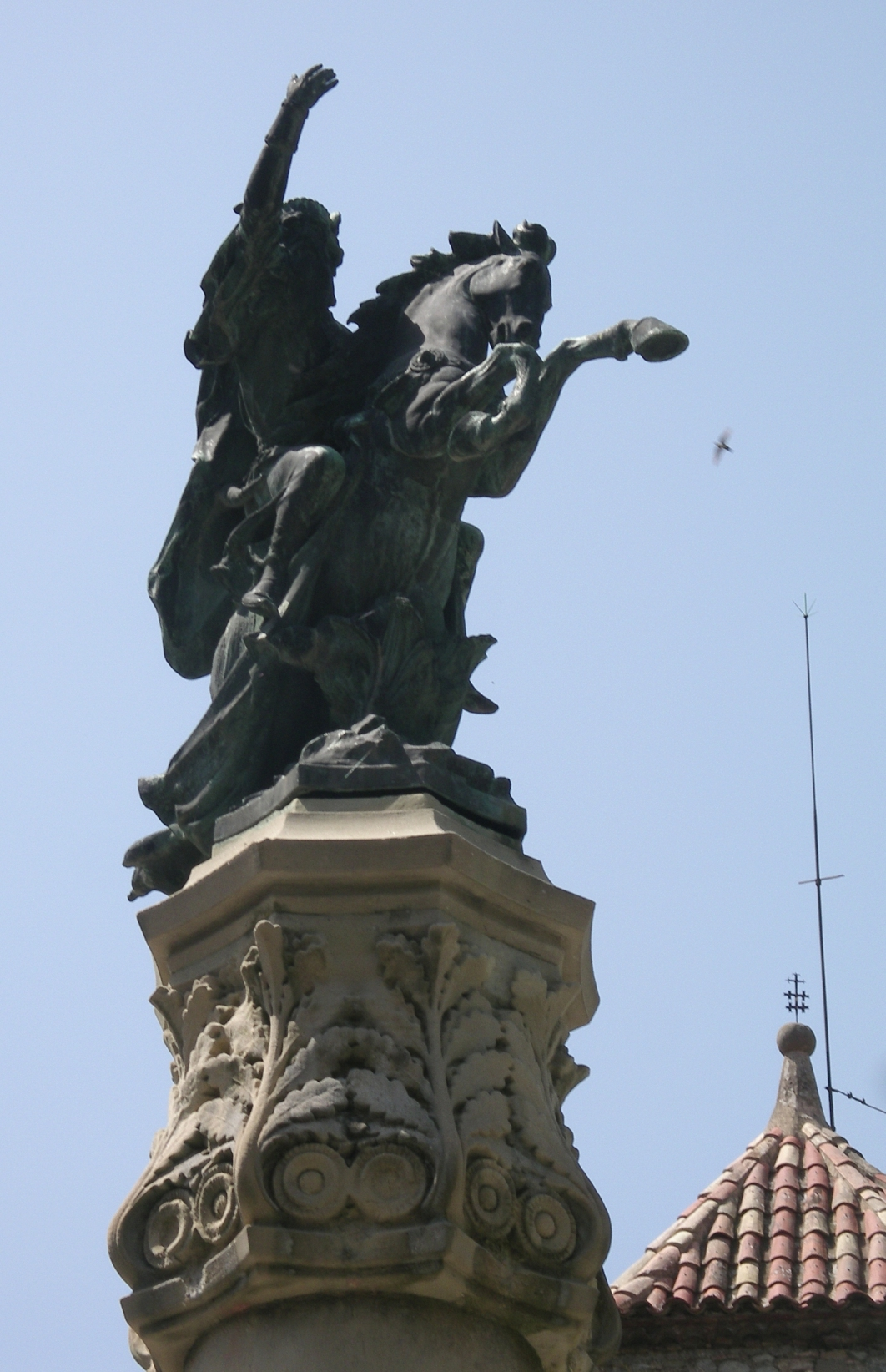
Fountain of Comte Arnau

== Santander ==
- Equestrian of General Franco at the Plaza del Ayuntamiento (removed in 2008).
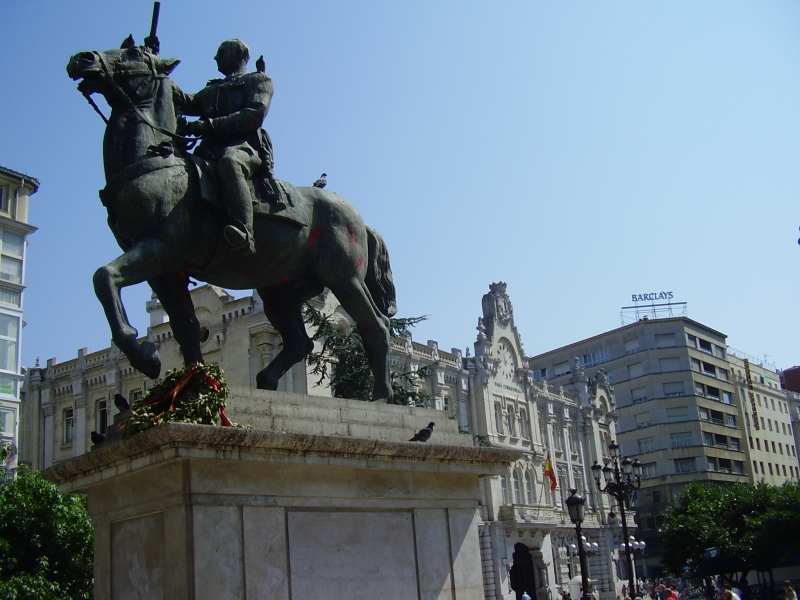
General Franco in Santander

== Seville ==
- Equestrian of King Fernando III at the Plaza Nueva.
- Equestrian of El Cid at Prado de San Sebastian by Anna Hyatt Huntington
- Equestrian of Simón Bolivar Glorieta de Buenos Aires.
- Equestrian of María de las Mercedes Borbón y Orleans at Paseo de Colón.
- Equestrian of The Scout, a 1992 gift from Seville's sister-city, Kansas City, Missouri.
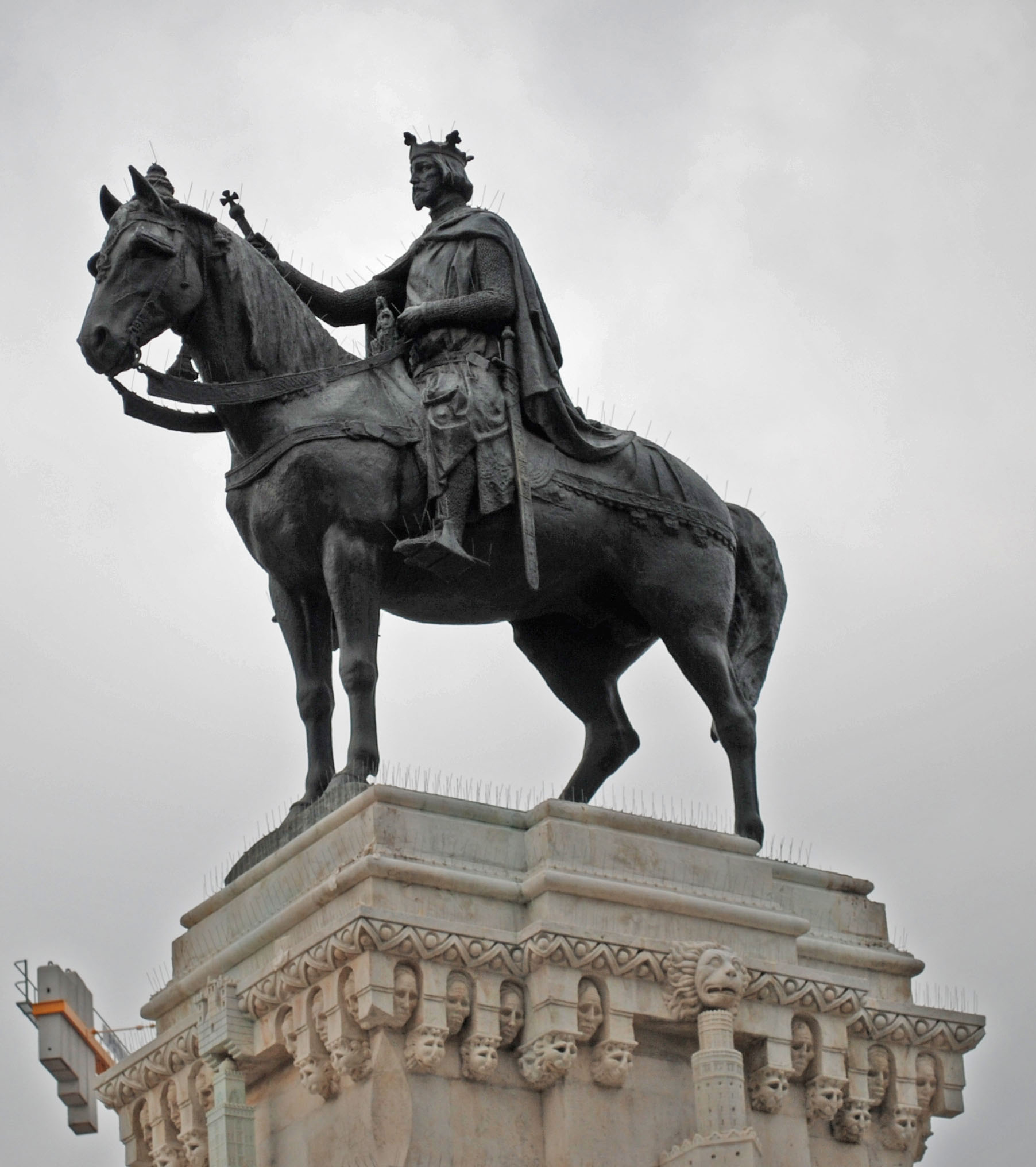
King Fernando III at Plaza Nueva

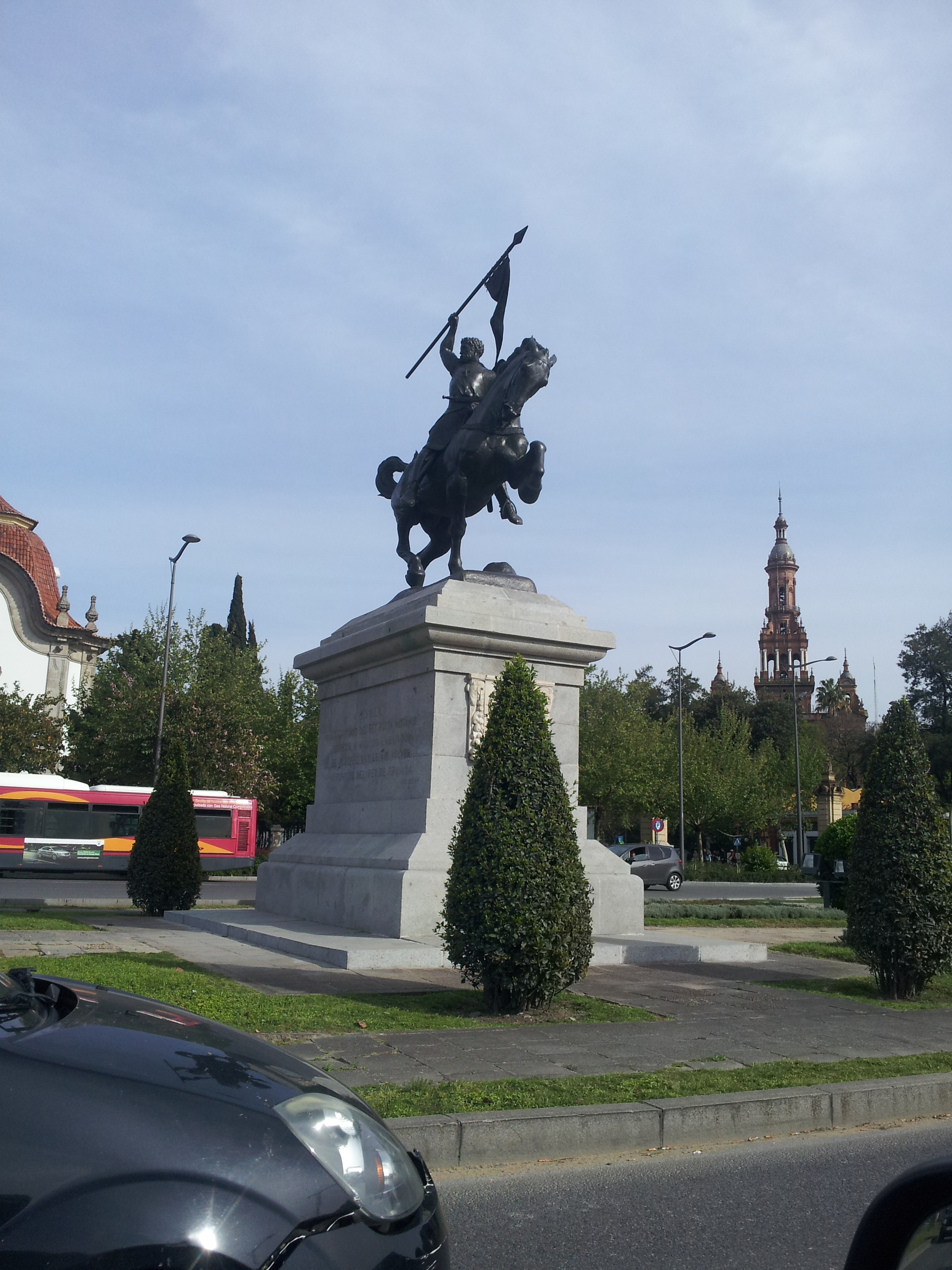
El Cid at Prado de San Sebastian by Anna Hyatt Huntington

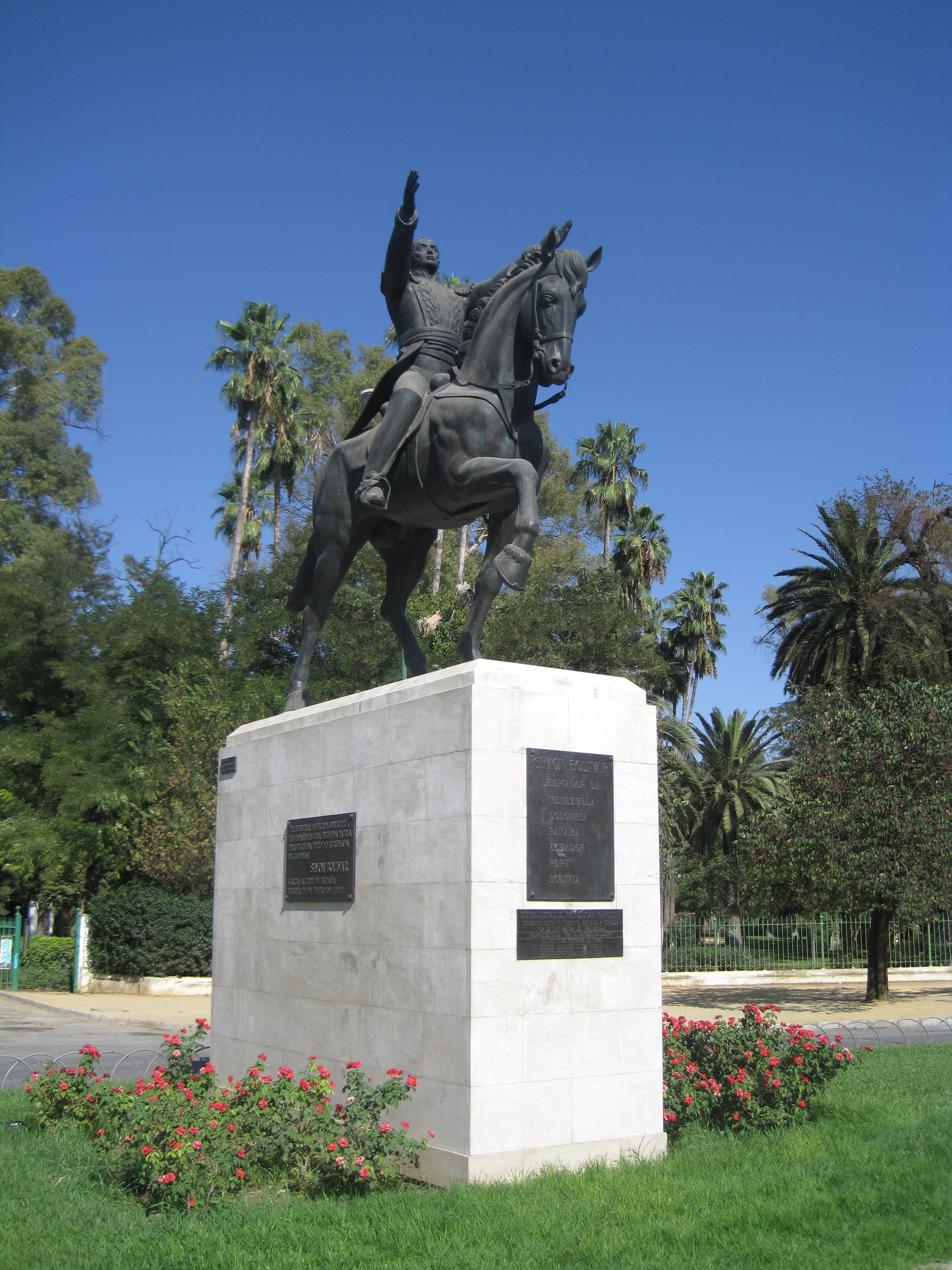
Simón Bolivar at Glorieta de Buenos Aires

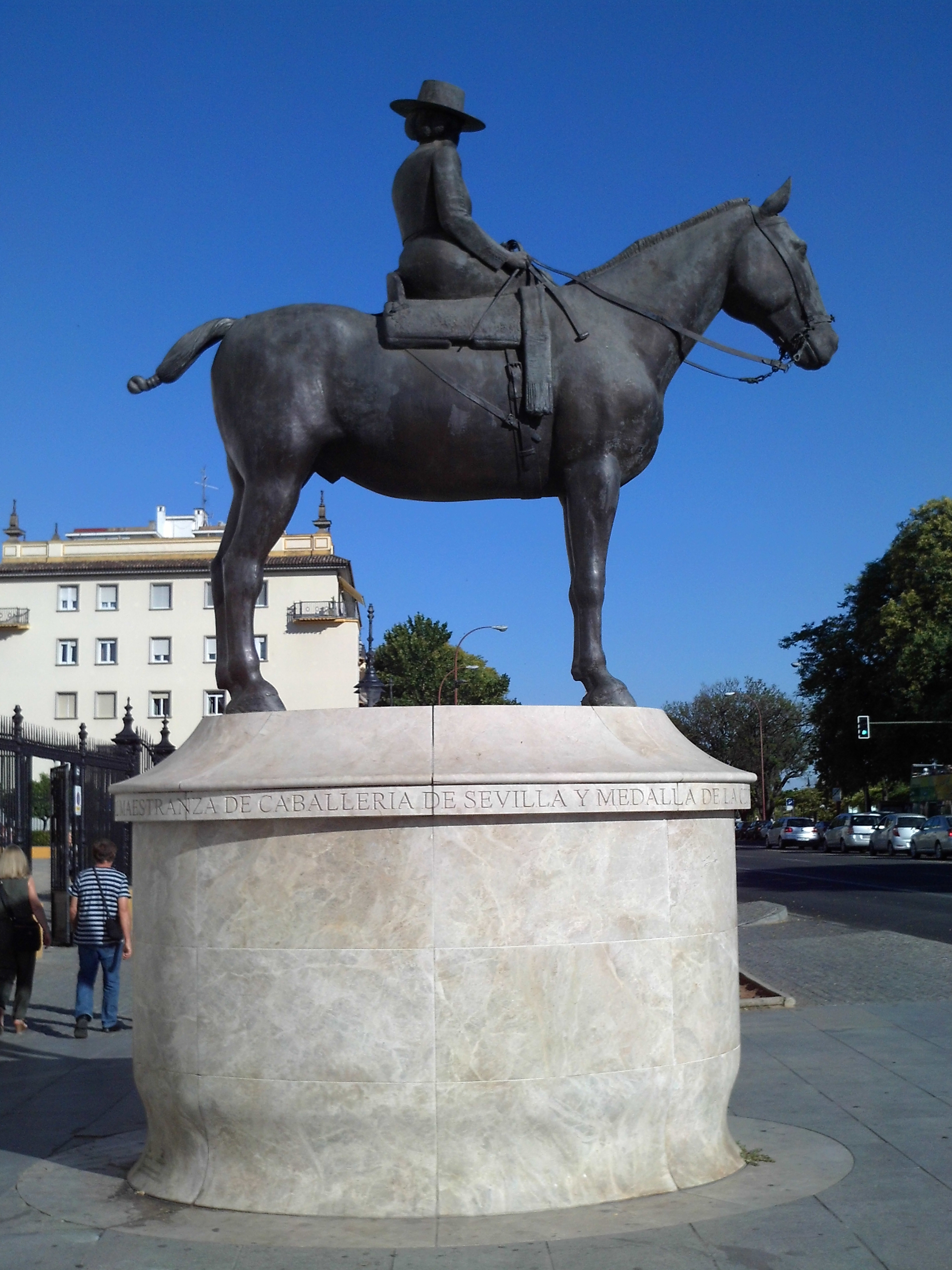
María de las Mercedes Borbón y Orleans at Paseo de Colón

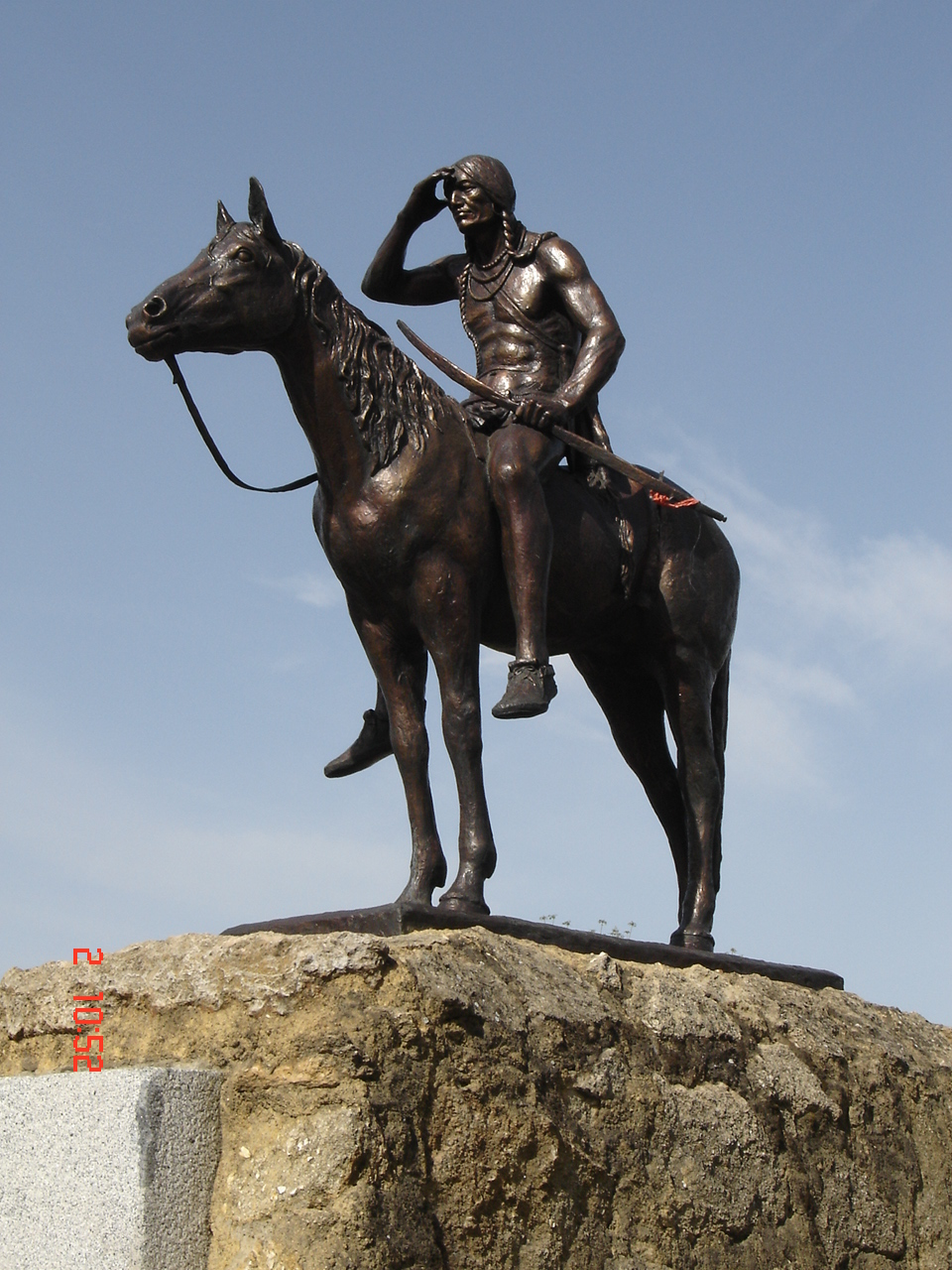
Half-size replica of Cyrus Edwin Dallin's The Scout (1910). A 1992 gift from Seville's sister-city, Kansas City, Missouri.

== Trujillo ==
- Equestrian of Francisco Pizarro by Charles Rumsey at the Plaza Major, 1926.
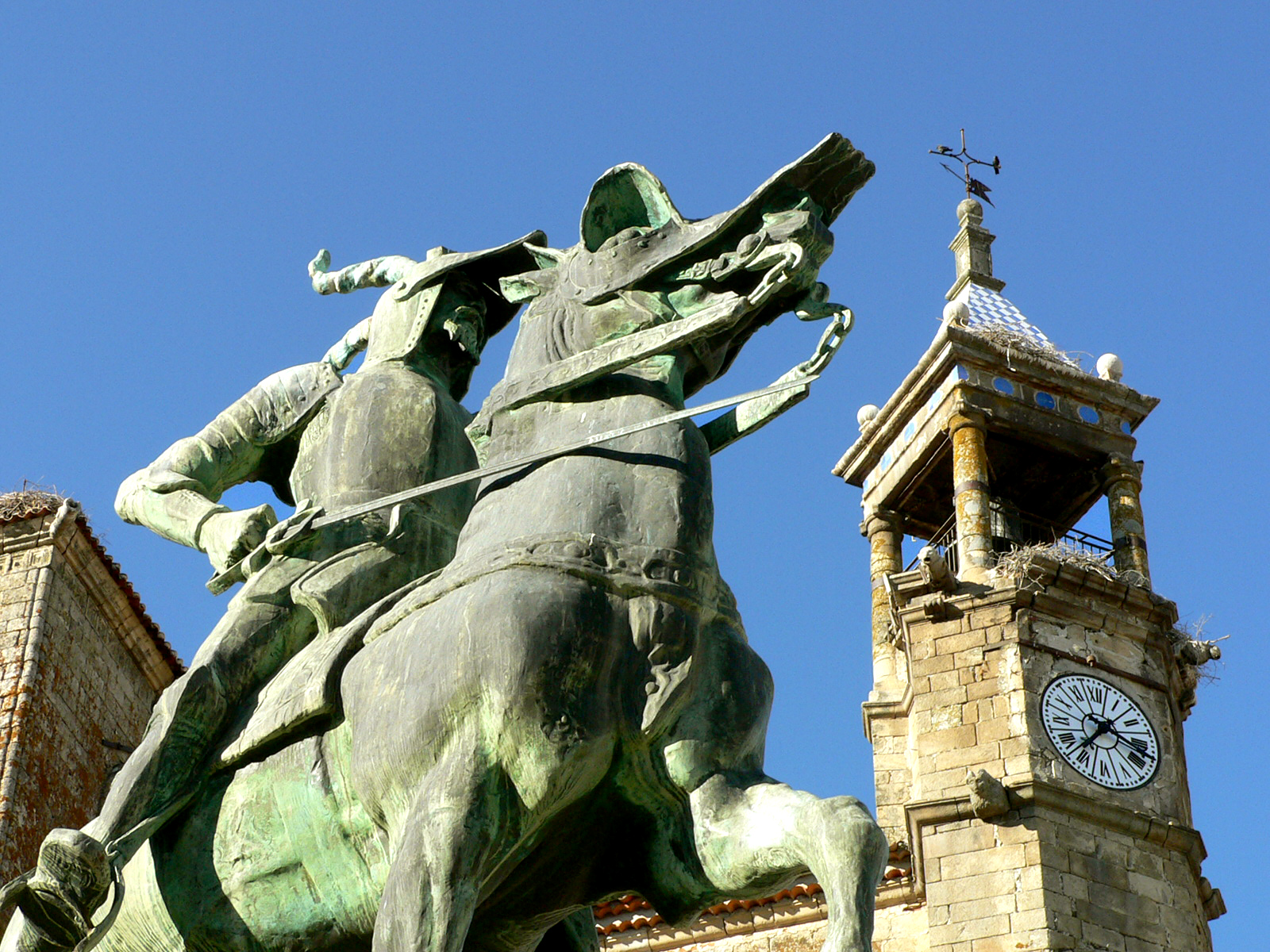
Francisco Pizarro at Plaza Major

== Valdepeñas ==
- Equestrian of Don Quixote
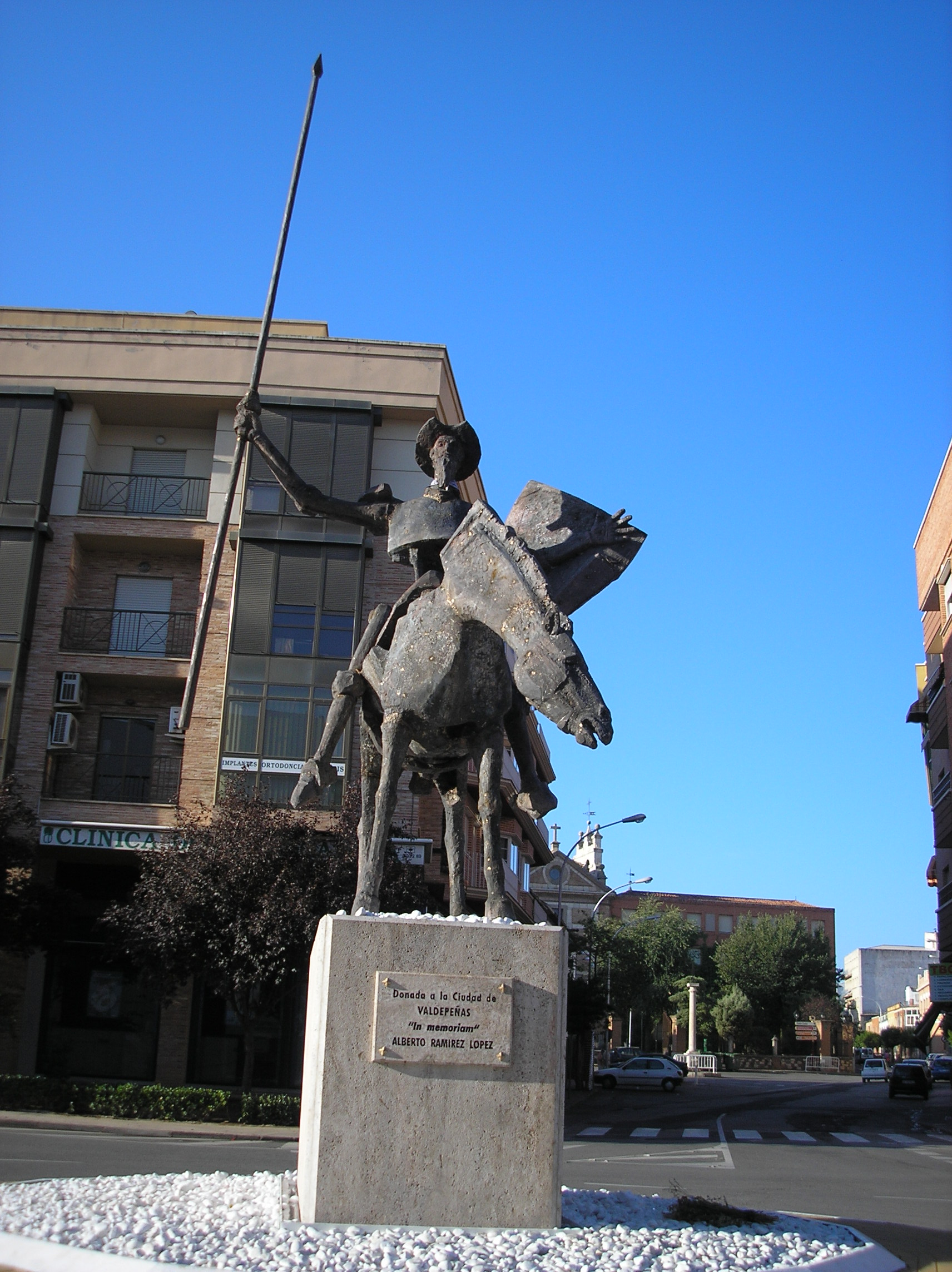
Don Quixote

== Valencia ==
- Equestrian of James I of Aragon, by Agapit Vallmitjana i Barbany, 1886.
- El Cid by Anna Hyatt Huntington, at Plaça d'Espanya
- Equestrian of Francisco Franco, before at Plaça de l'Ajuntament, now at Convent de Sant Doménec
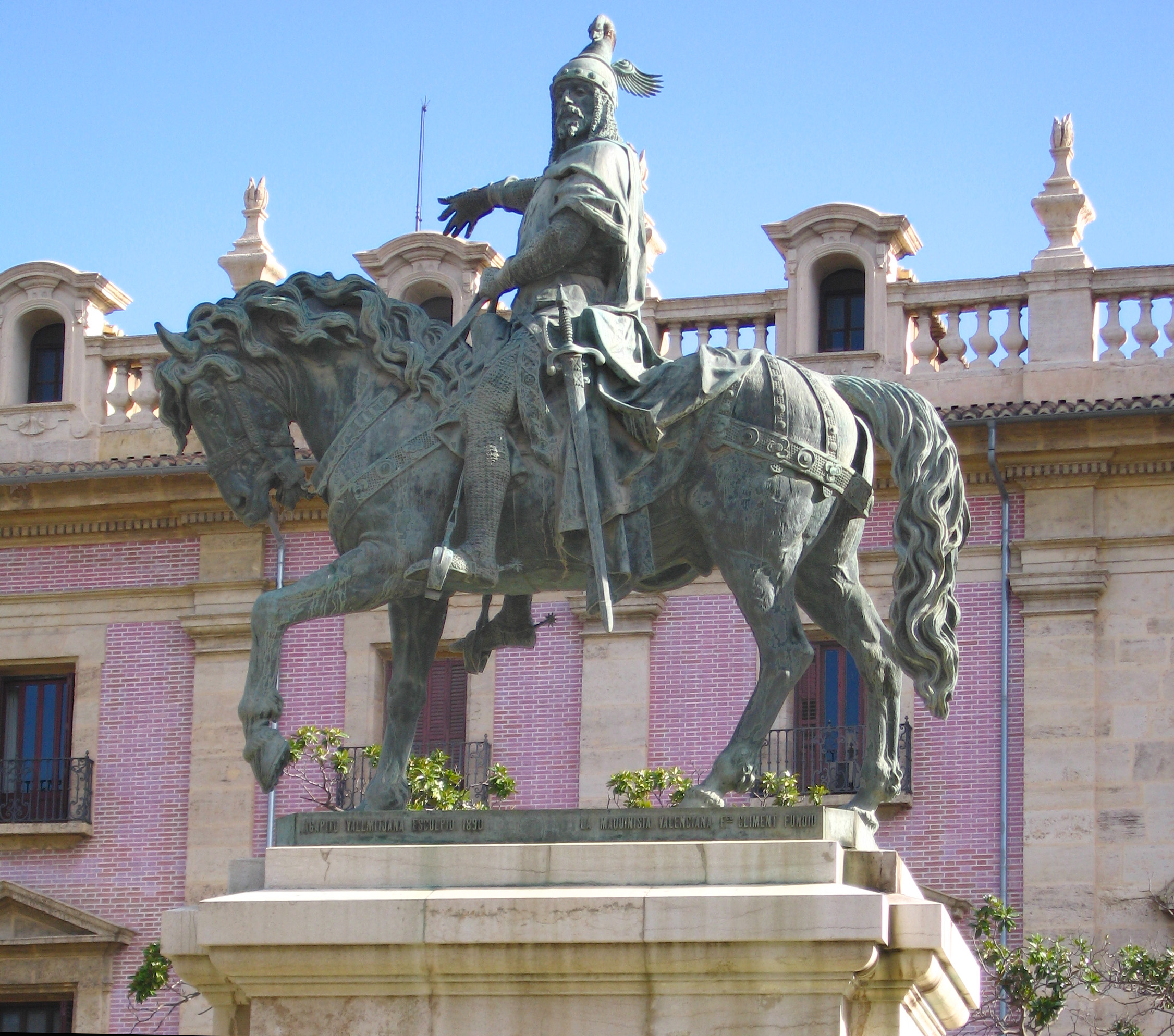
King James I of Aragon

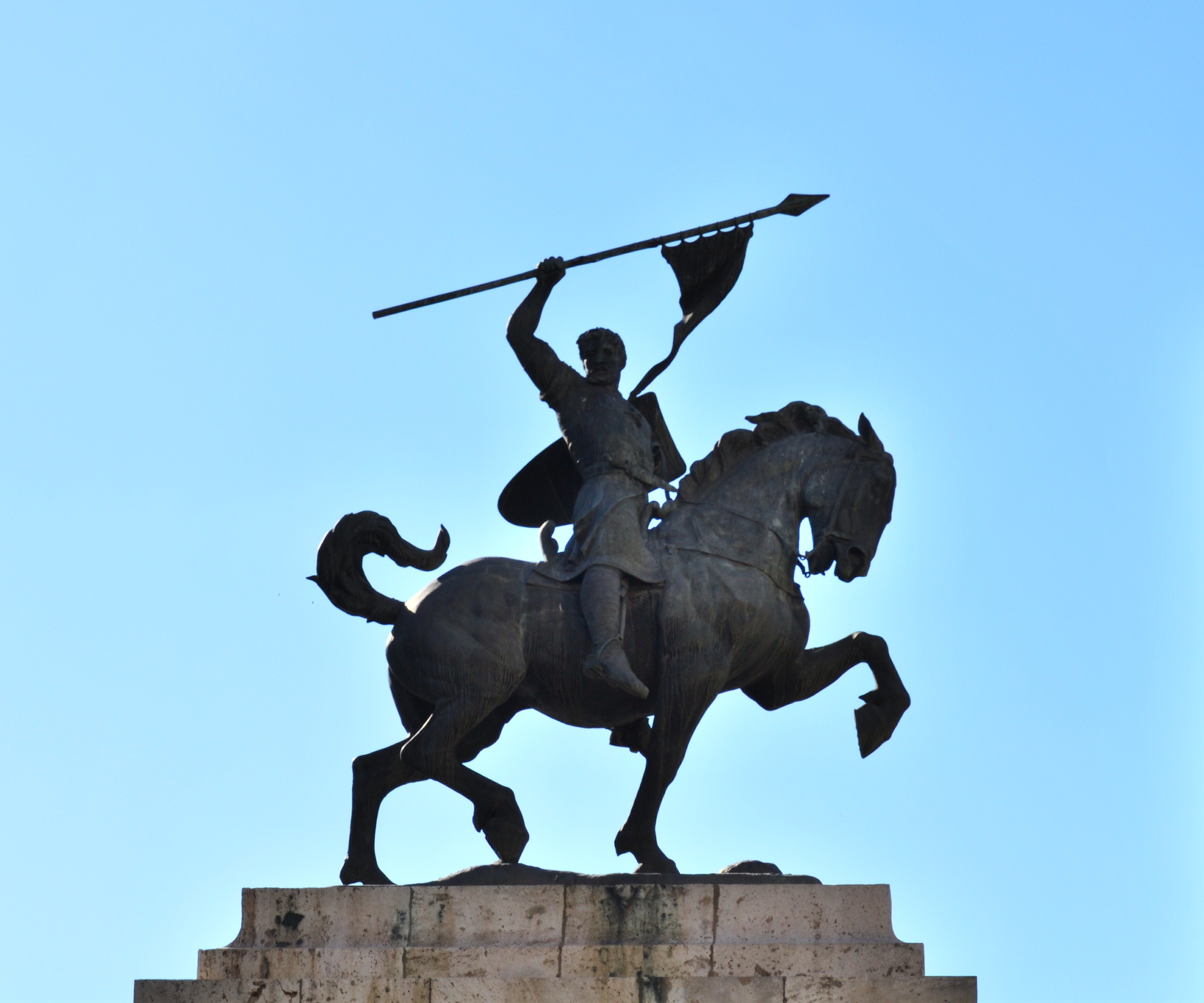
El Cid at Plaça d'Espanya

== Valladolid ==
- Monument to Cavalry in the Battle of Annual in front of the Academia de Caballería.
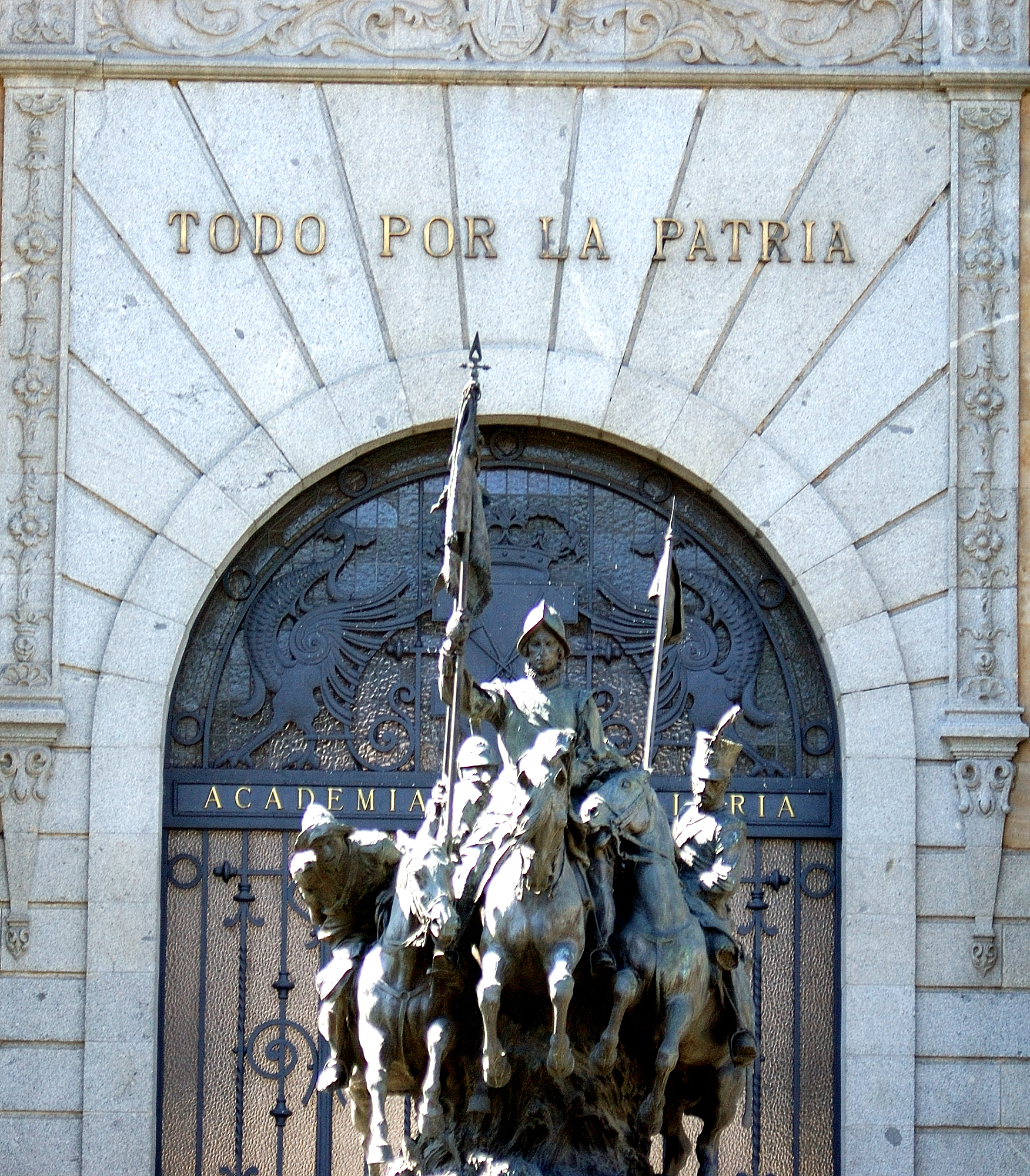
Monument to Cavalry

== Vitoria-Gasteiz ==
- Equestrian of General Miguel Ricardo de Álava, as part of the Battle of Vitoria Monument, at the Plaza de la Virgen Blanca.
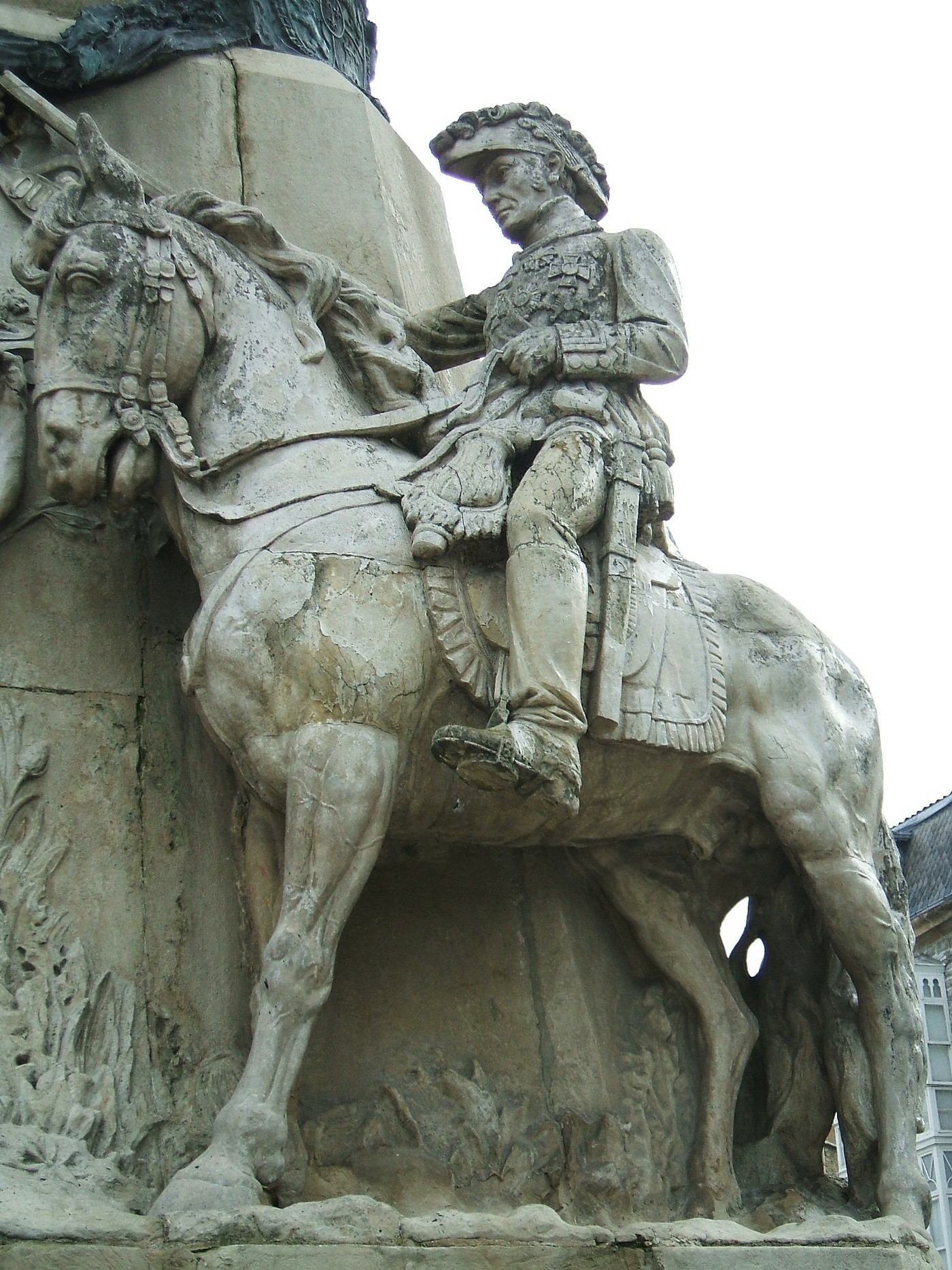
General Miguel Ricardo de Álava in Vitoria-Gasteiz

== Zaragoza ==
- Monument to José de Palafox, 1st Duke of Zaragoza by Ignacio (Iñaki) Rodríguez Ruiz at Plaza de José María Forqué, inaugurated in 2000.

== See also ==
- Sculptures in Plaça de Catalunya
