= Monument to General Martínez Campos =

Monument in Madrid

General Martínez Campos
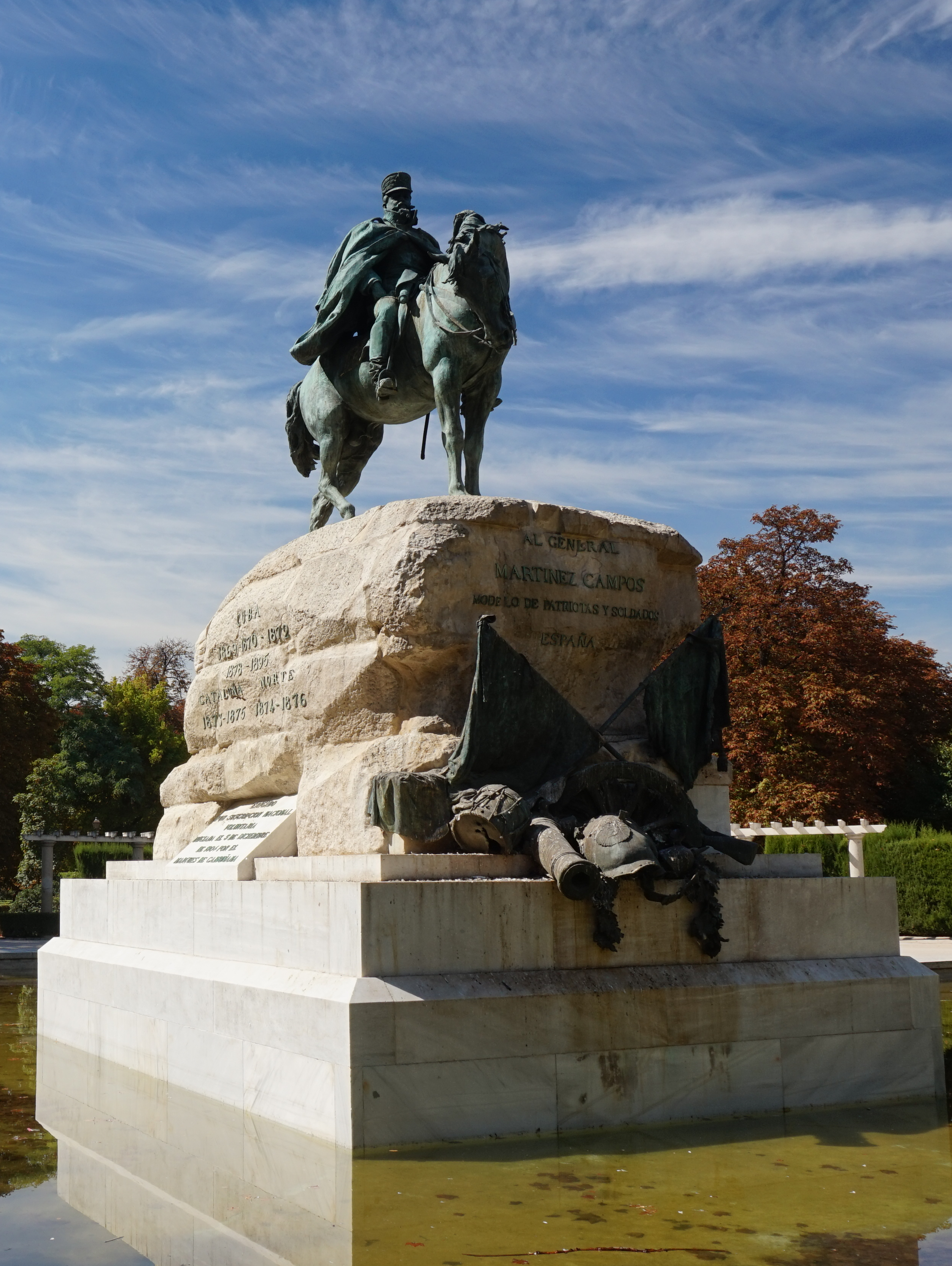
- 40.417806°N 3.680936°W
- Location: El Retiro, Madrid, Spain
- Designer: Mariano Benlliure
- Material: Bronze, limestone, marble
- Opening date: 28 January 1907
- Dedicated to: Arsenio Martínez Campos

The Monument to General Martínez Campos is an instance of public art in Madrid, Spain. Designed by Mariano Benlliure, it consists of an sculptural ensemble presided by an equestrian statue of General Arsenio Martínez Campos, who played a key role in bringing the Bourbon Restoration by leading the coup d'etat of Sagunto in 1874. It lies on the centre of the Plaza de Guatemala, in El Retiro.

== History and description ==
Years after some inconclusive lobbying by Antonio Berenguer and José Ibáñez Marín intending to promote the erection of a monument dedicated to Martínez Campos, the Marquis of Cabriñana resumed the initiative by organizing a popular subscription in 1904, succeeding in bringing on board many military officers. The project was awarded to Mariano Benlliure. The managing committee for the monument was constituted in 1905, with General Primo de Rivera as chairman.

Benlliure worked simultaneously in this project and in the Castelar's project.

A staircase pedestal made of white marble with 4 steps constitutes the base of the monument. A largely unpolished crag made of limestone from Tamajón lies on top of the marble plinth, creating the sense of being a natural feature.

The front side of the monument displays a war trophy cast in bronze consisting of two flags (cavalry and infantry) and additional wartime items, with an inscription carved above in the limestone reading "al general martínez campos, modelo de patriotas y soldados, españa" ("to General Martínez Campos, model of patriots and soldiers, Spain"). The right-hand side of the crag displays inscriptions compiling important military dates, namely "cuba 1869-1870-1872, 1878-1895", "cataluña 1873-1875" and "norte 1874-1876". A relief carved in the limestone rock representing the battle of Castillejos extends across the left-hand and back sides of the crag, featuring an inscription in the marble below reading áfrica 1859–1860.

The right side and back side display another two additional plaques reading "erigido por suscripción nacional voluntaria, iniciada el 5 de diciembre de 1904 por el marqués de cabriñana" ("erected by voluntary national subscription, initiated on 5 December 1904 by the Marquis of Cabriñana") and "inaugurado por s. m. el rey don alfonso xiii, 28 de enero de 1907" ("inaugurated by His Majesty King Alfonso XIII, 28 January 1907").

Cast in bronze in Barcelona by Masriera & Campins' foundry, the equestrian statue of Martínez Campos top it all off.

The monument was unveiled on 28 January 1907, during a ceremony attended by Alfonso XIII and Victoria Eugenie, and Antonio Maura, among others.

The Council of Government of the Community of Madrid declared the monument as bien de interés cultural in 2013.

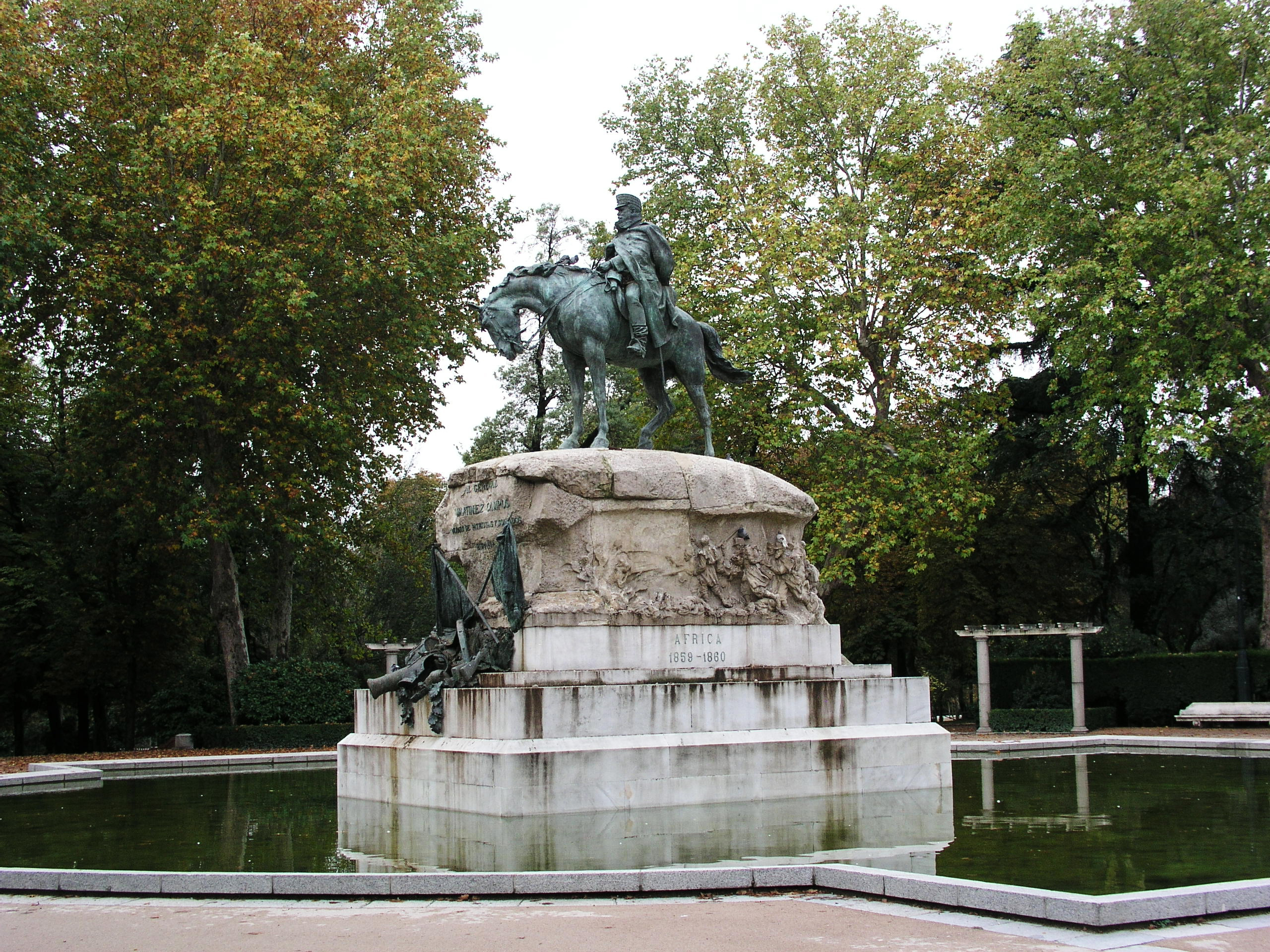
View of the left-hand side

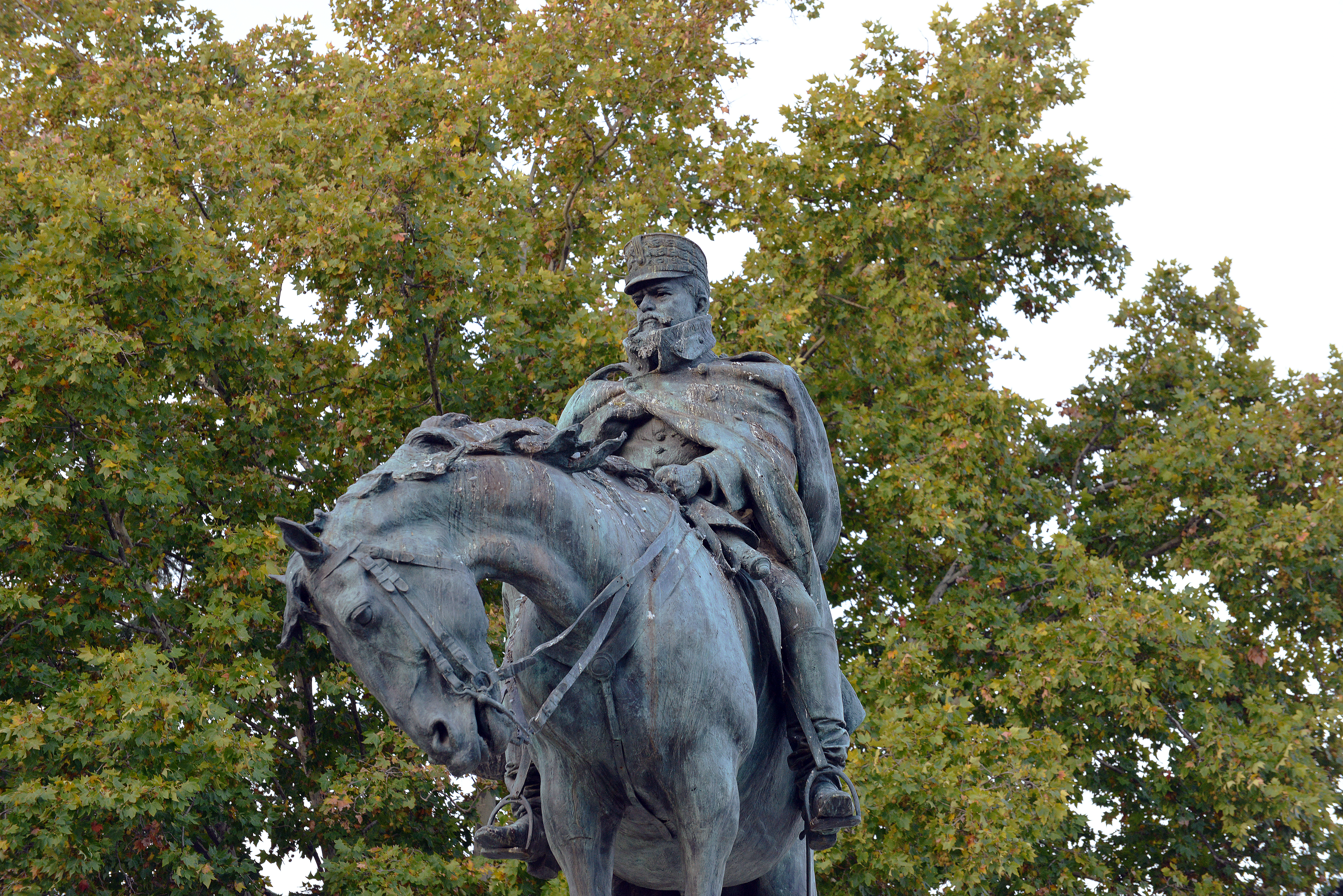
Closer look of the general

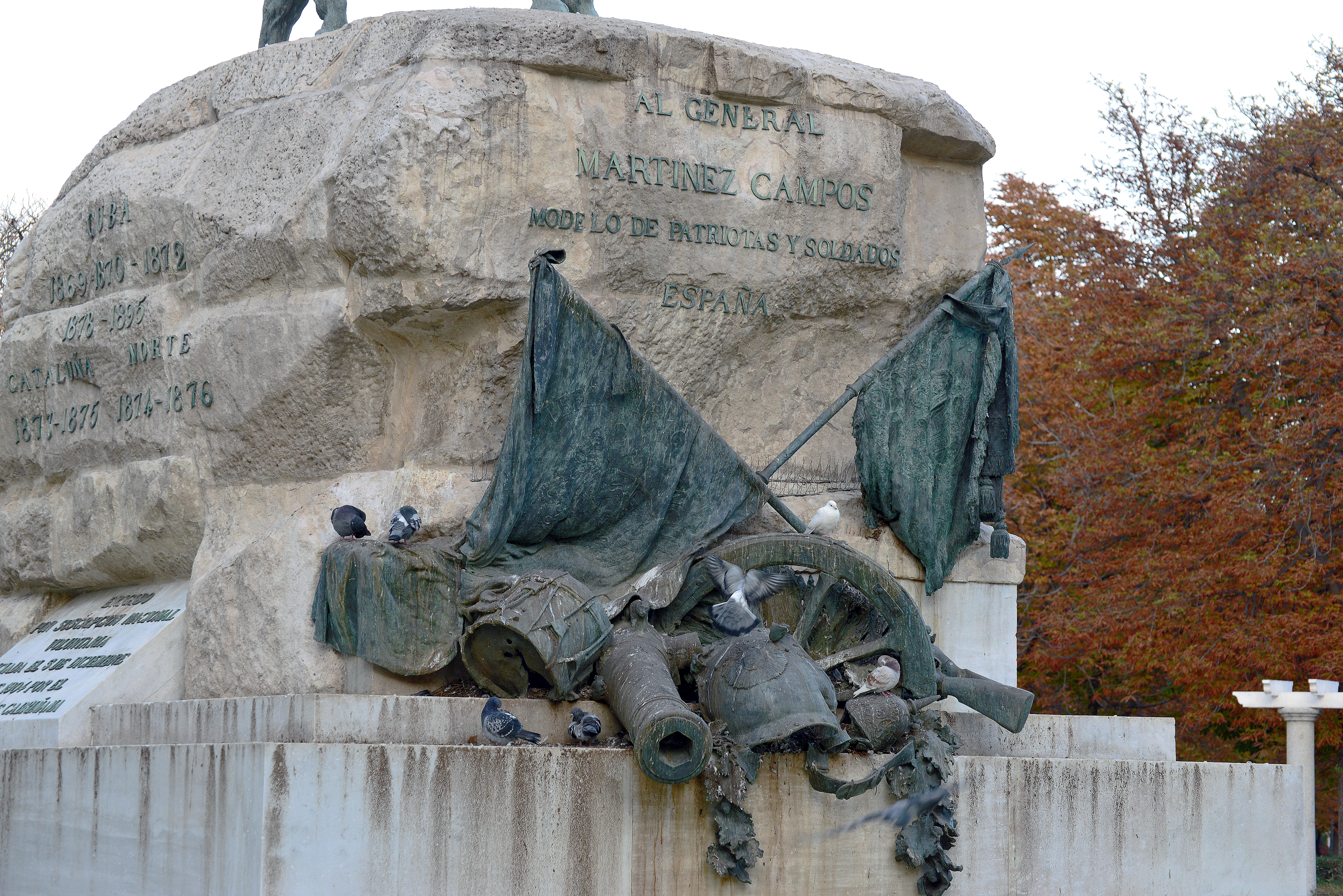
Detail of the war trophy
