= Monument to Agustina de Aragón (Zaragoza) =

Monument in Zaragoza

Agustina Zaragoza and the Heroines
- Agustina Zaragoza y las Heroínas
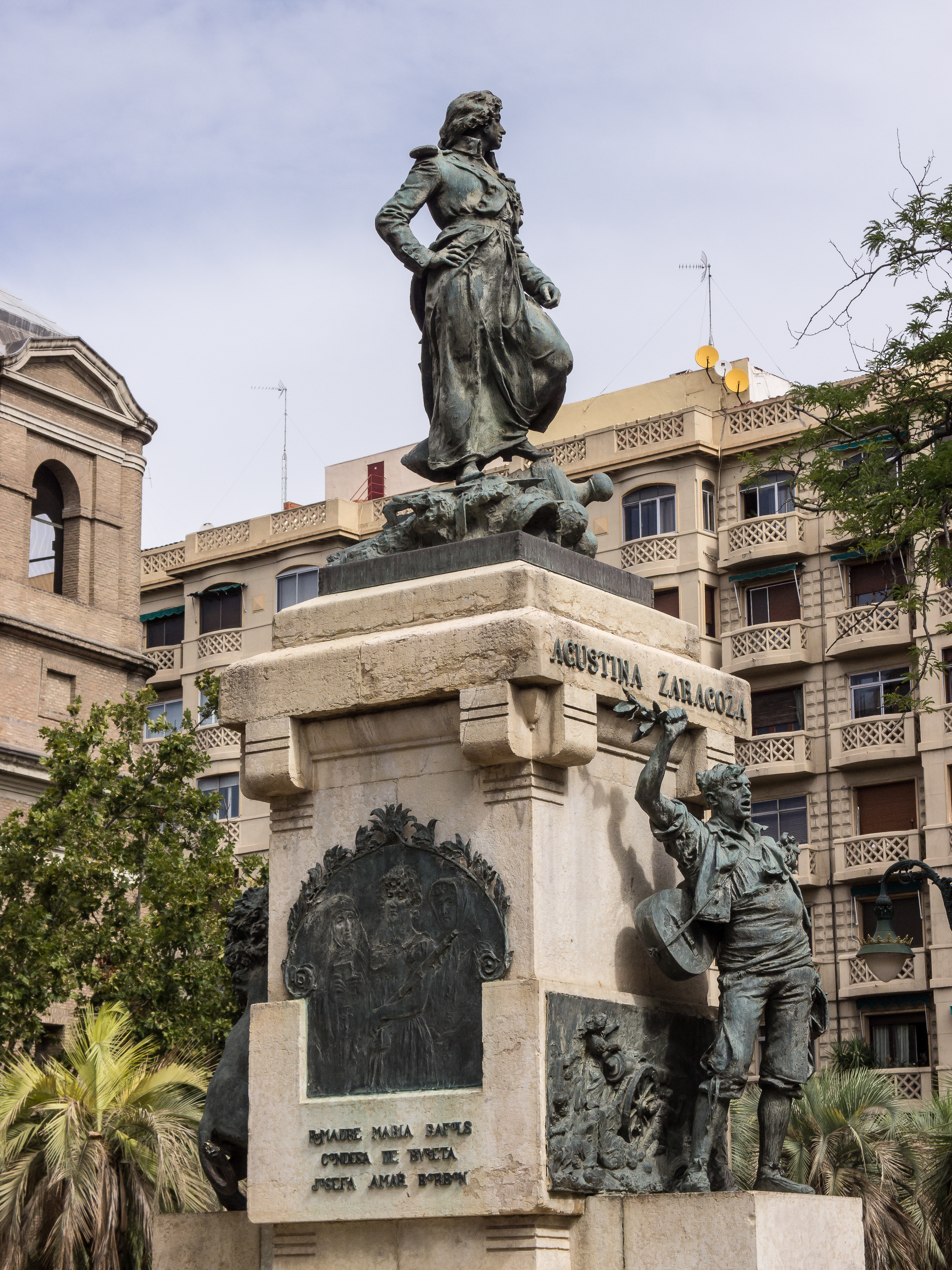
- 41.655553°N 0.892405°W
- Location: Zaragoza, Spain
- Designer: Mariano Benlliure
- Material: Bronze, stone
- Opening date: 29 October 1908
- Dedicated to: Agustina de Aragón, María Rafols, María de la Consolación Azlor, Josefa Amar y Borbón, Manuela Sancho, Casta Álvarez and María Agustín

Agustina Zaragoza y las Heroínas or the Monument to Agustina de Aragón is an instance of public art in Zaragoza, Spain. Designed by Mariano Benlliure, it consists of a bronze statue of Agustina de Aragón topping off a stone pedestal that displays two other sculptural groups and a number of reliefs. The latter subsidiarily pay homage to another six heroines of the Zaragozan theatre of the Peninsular War.

== History and description ==
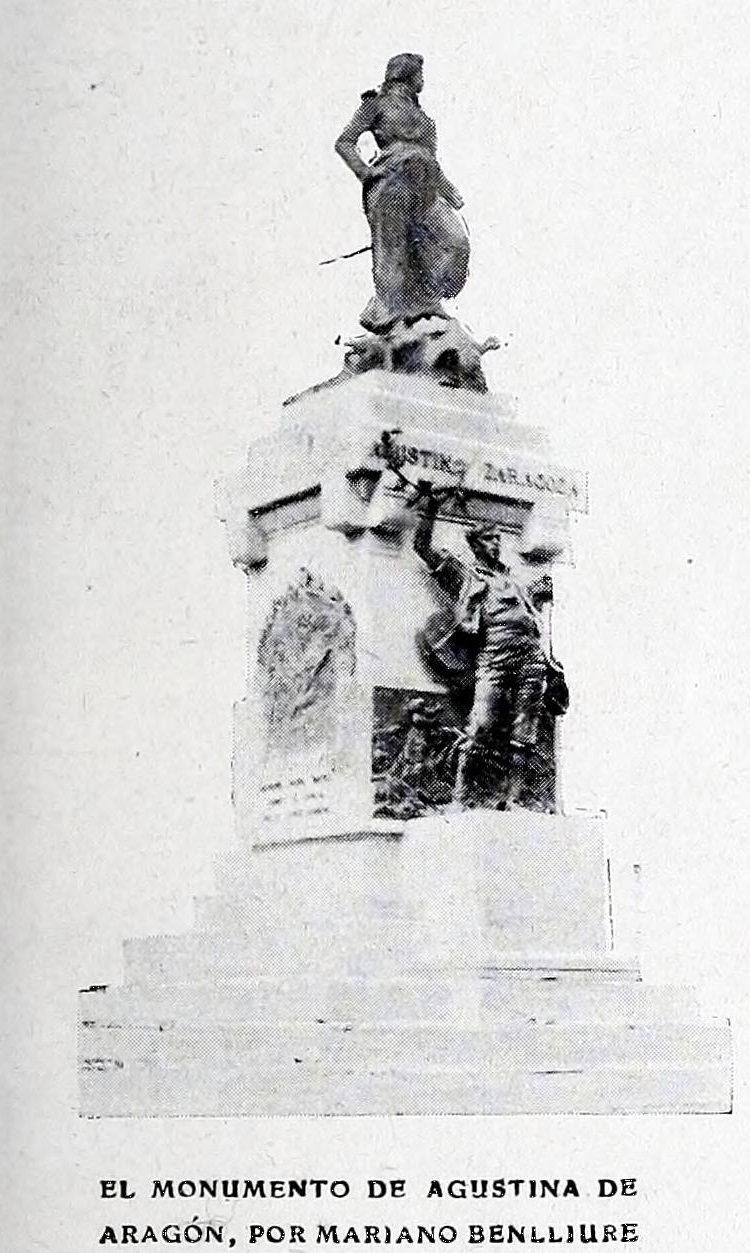
Photograph of the monument published in Blanco y Negro on 7 November 1908 to account for the inauguration

Predated by earlier initiatives to erect a monument to Agustina de Aragón tracing back in time at least to 1901, the committee that managed the project awarded the design to Mariano Benlliure in 1907.

Cast in bronze at Cescati's foundry in Barcelona, the dashing figure of Agustina de Aragón topping off the monument—reportedly inspired in real-life Lucrecia Arana— is depicted wearing an artillery open front jacket with an epaulette and a shoulder pad, while stepping on a cannon.

The front side of the white stone pedestal displays the bronze baturro (Aragonese peasant type) in attitude of crowning the name of "agustina zaragoza" in bronze letters on the pedestal with a laurel wreath, while carrying a guitar on his back. The back side of the pedestal features a bronze sculptural group with a Spanish lion (Zaragoza) pawing at an eagle (an allegory of the First French Empire), and an inscription reading "2 de julio de 1808" ("2 July 1808").

Both the lion and eagle and the baturro were cast too at Cescati's foundry in Barcelona. The bronze was provided by the Ministry of War.

The front side also presents a relief illustrating the feat of Agustina de Aragón using the cannon. Meanwhile, the flanks of the pedestal display bronze reliefs paying homage to the heroines of Zaragoza.

The monument was unveiled on 29 October 1908 at its location in the plaza del Portillo, during a ceremony attended by Alfonso XIII and Victoria Eugenie; Antonio Maura (Prime Minister) and Florencio Jardiel (Dean of the Cathedral of Zaragoza) intervened as speakers.

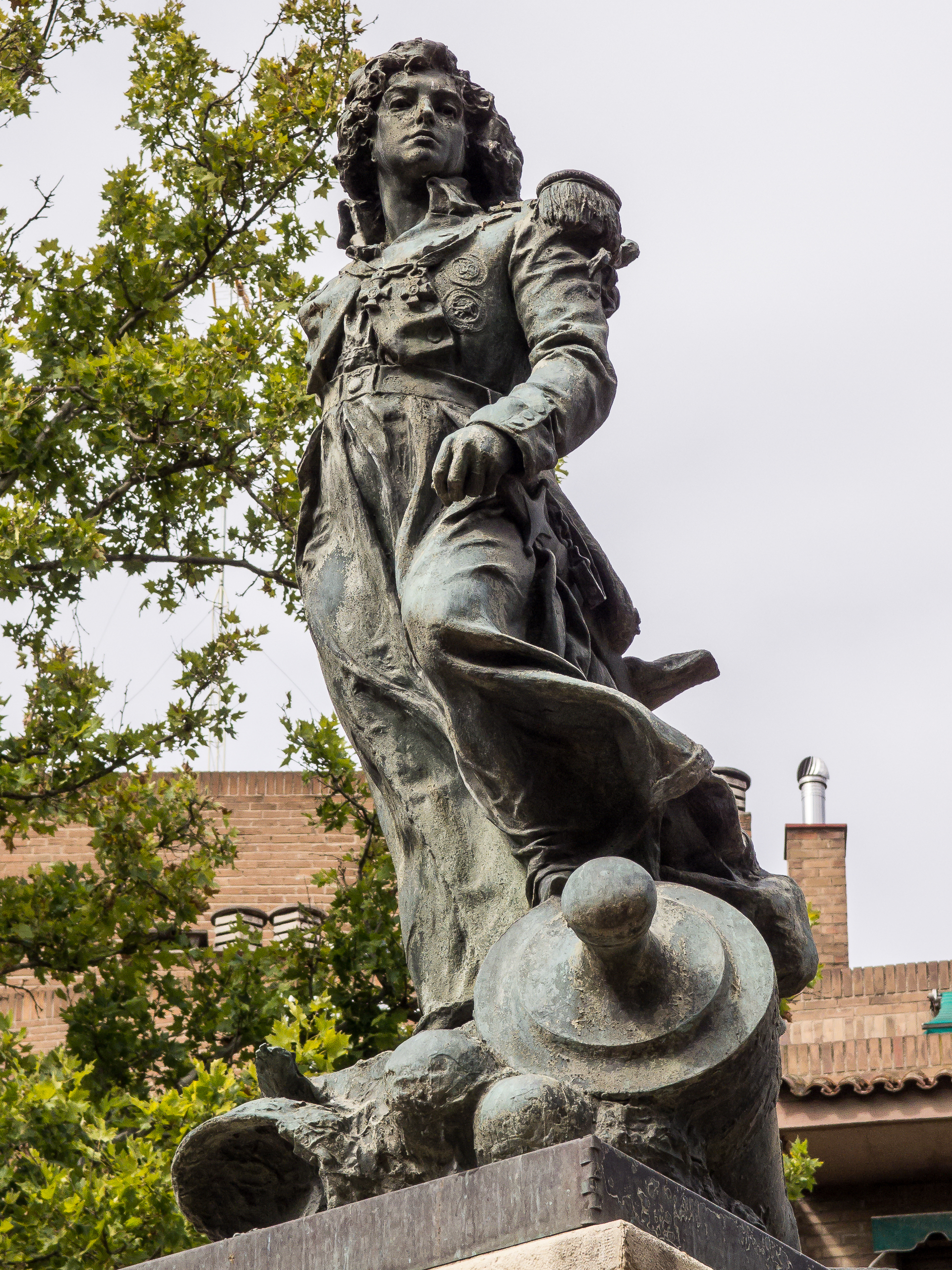
Closer look of Agustina de Aragón

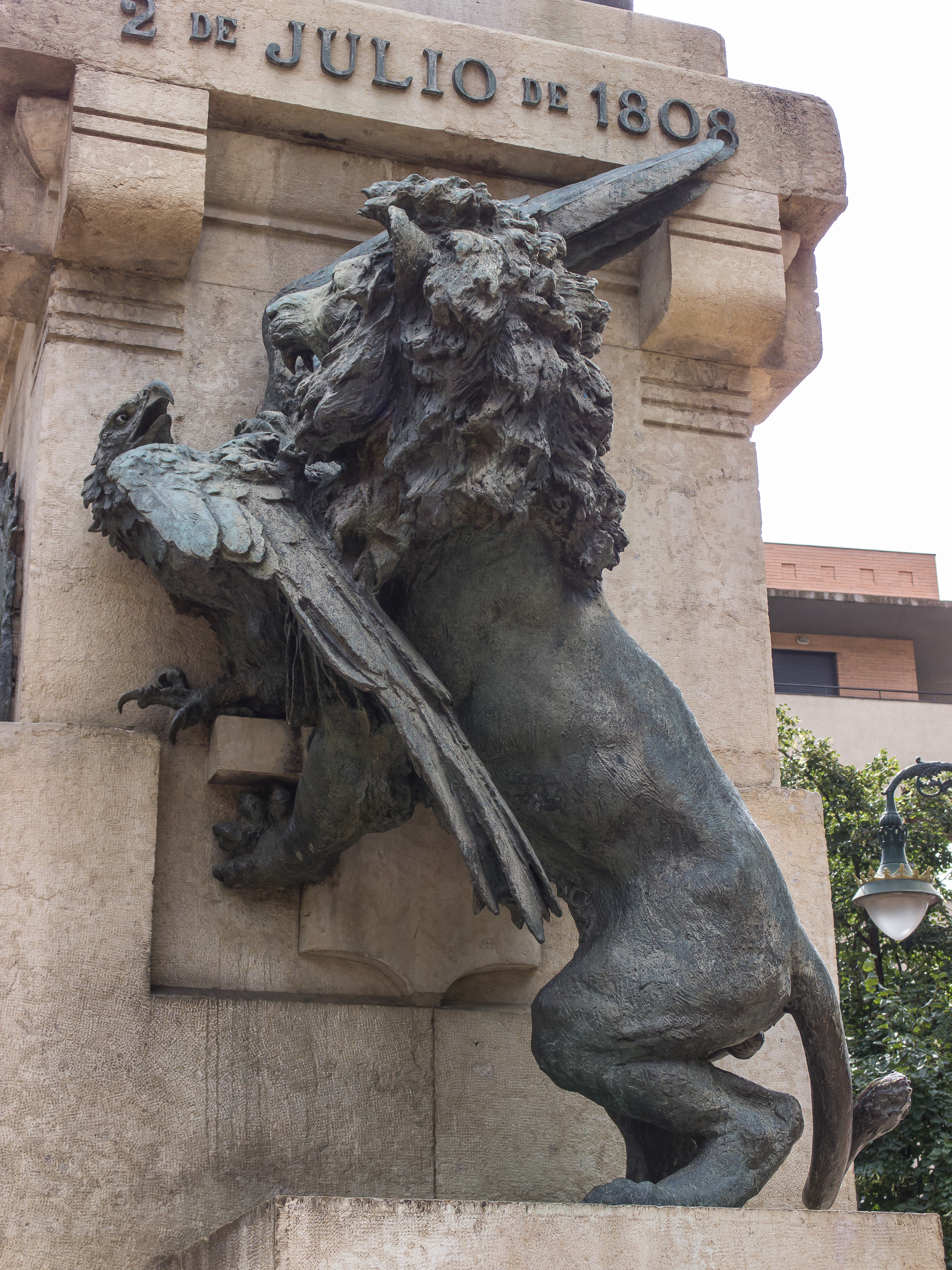
The lion attacking the eagle

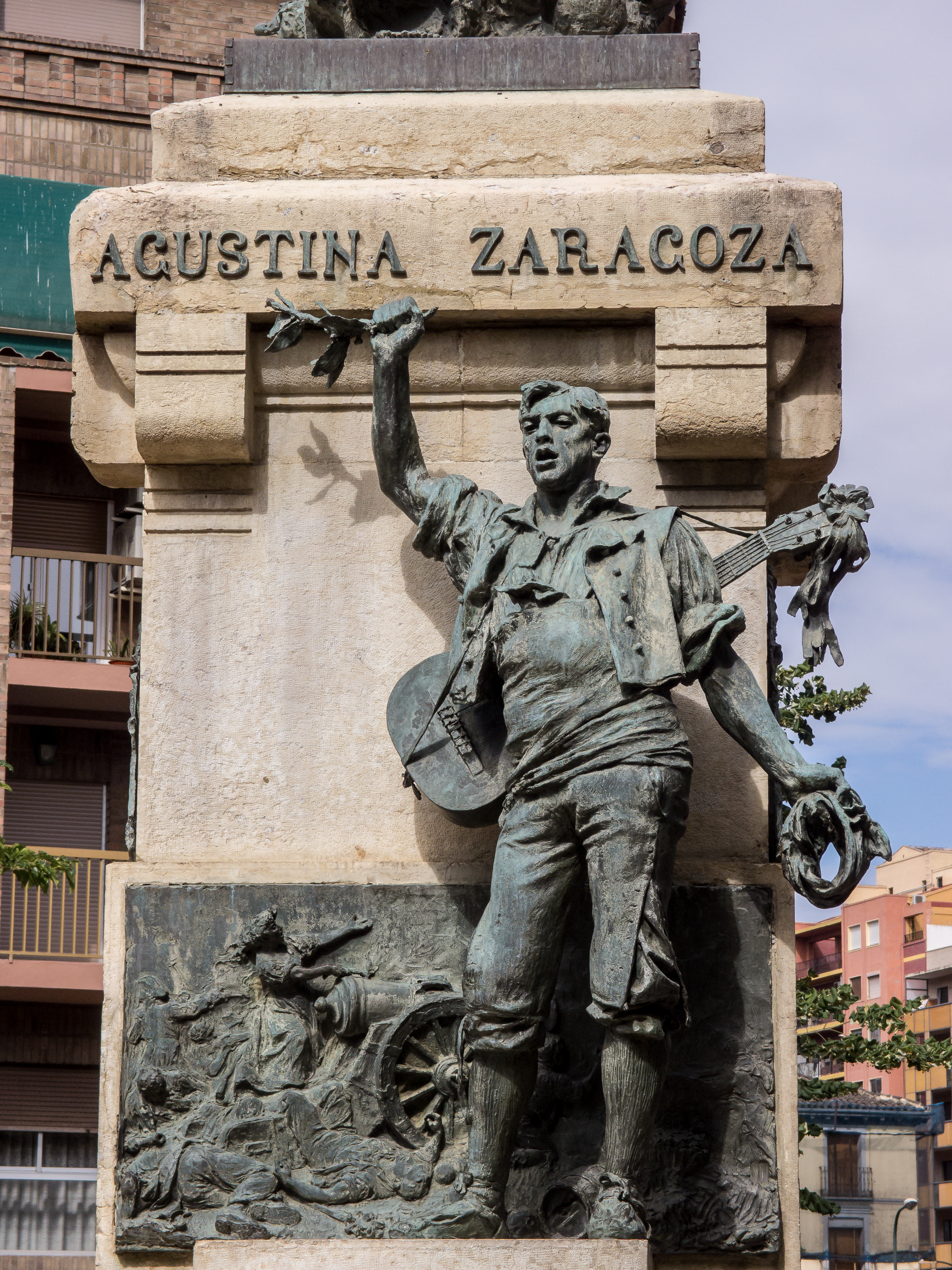
The baturro
