= Lucrecia Arana =

Spanish singer (1867–1927)

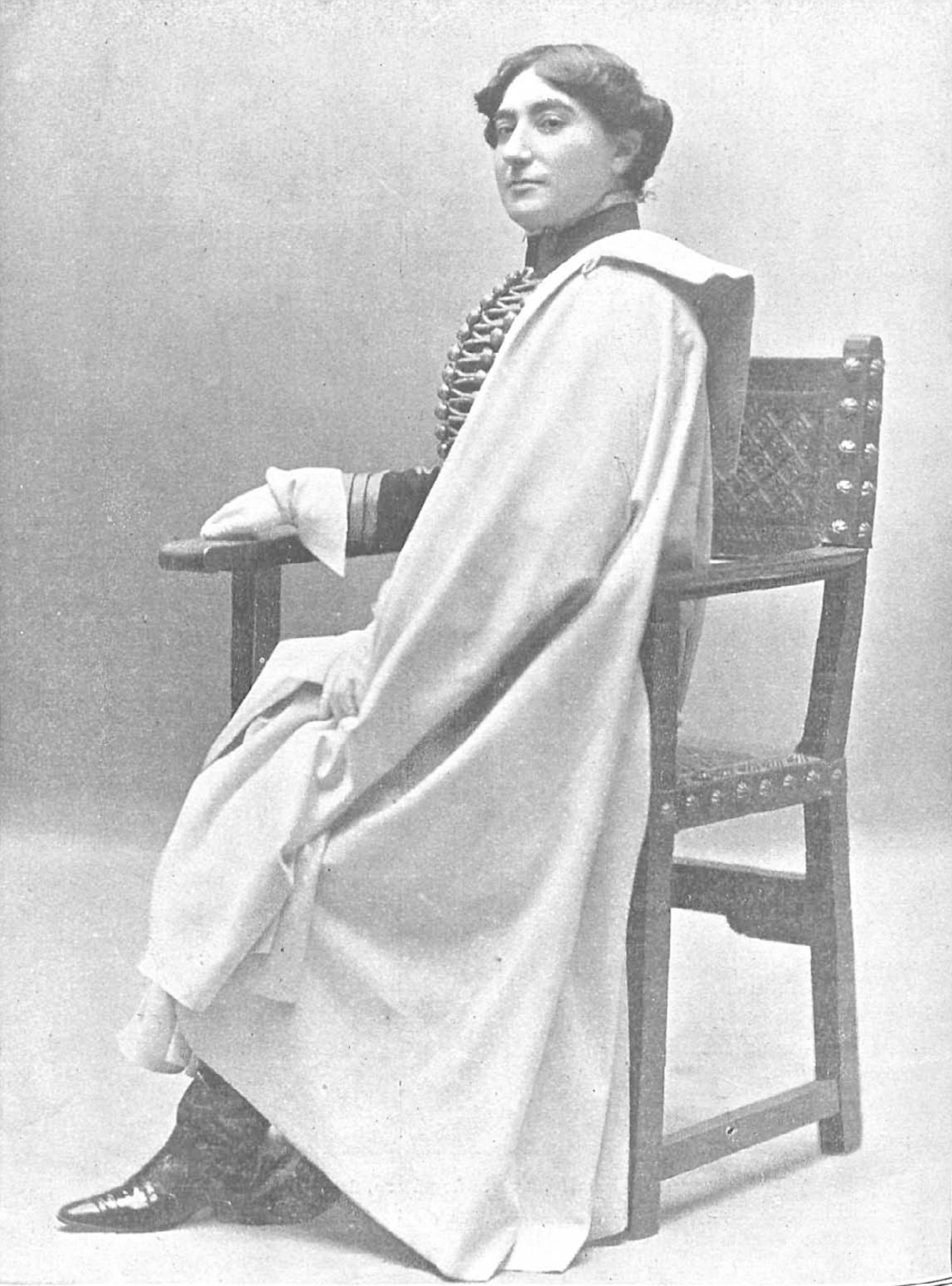
Lucrecia Arana, 1904

Lucrecia Arana (Haro, 23 November 1871 – Madrid, 9 March 1927) was a Spanish soprano-contralto singer. She is remembered for her unique voice and style in the zarzuela genre.

== Biography ==
Arana's father died during the Third Carlist War when she was only one year old. As a young woman, she moved to Madrid for singing lessons with the best teachers of the time. In 1887, at the age of fifteen, she made her debut with a minor role in the play "La mascota" at the Teatro Price in Madrid. With the Julian Romea company, she went on to perform in various locations in Spain, including in her hometown. From 1896 to 1898, she was performing at the Teatro de la Zarzuela in Madrid. After marrying Mariano Benlliure in 1908, she retired from the stage. Arana died in 1927 of a stroke in her home and was buried in the Cemetery of San Justo, in Madrid. Her husband carved a medal with her image which has since been awarded as a prize for the most outstanding singer at the Madrid Royal Conservatory.
