= Monument to Antonio Maura =

Monument in Guadalajara

Antonio Maura
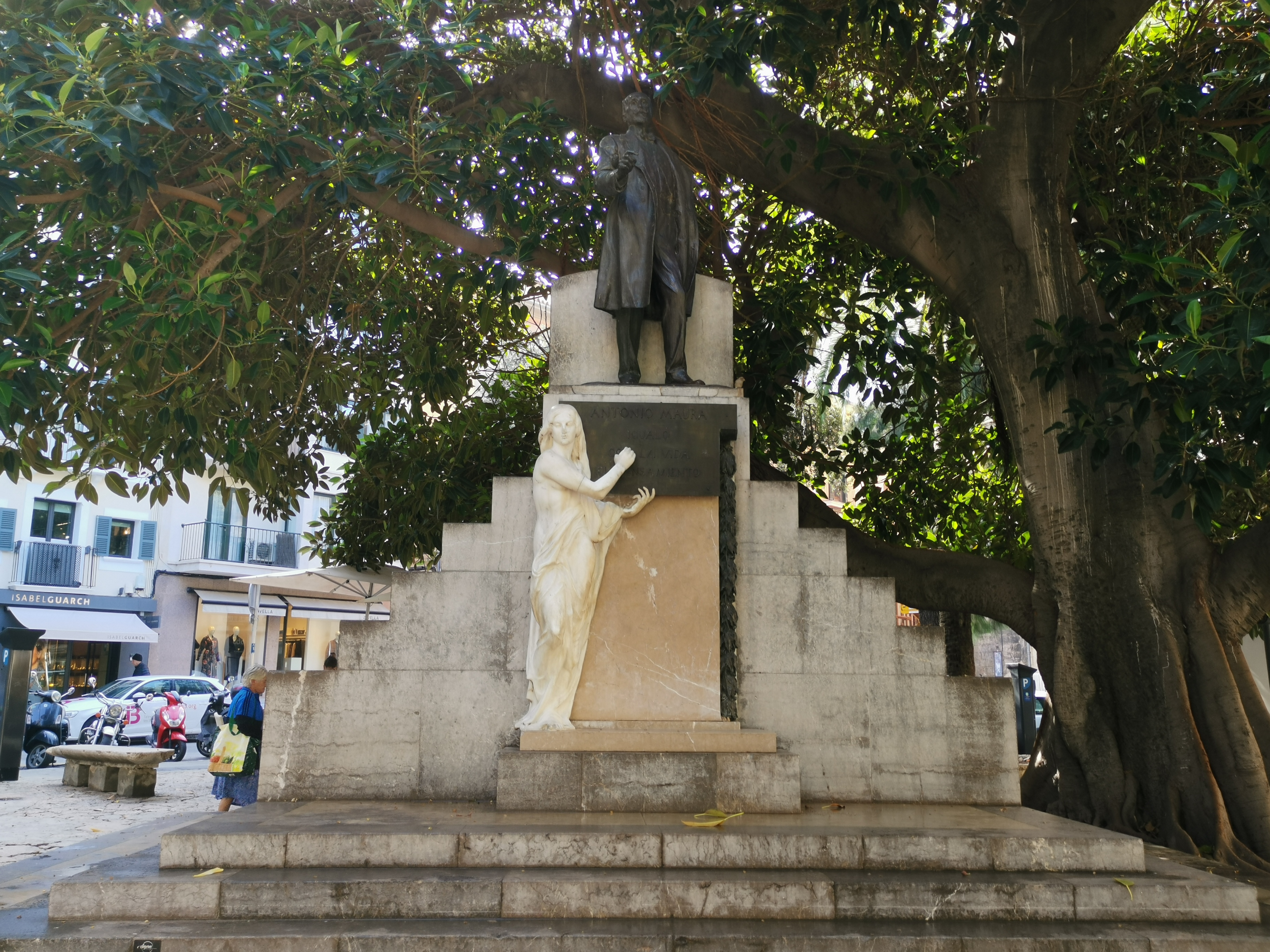
- Location: Plaça del Mercat, Palma, Spain
- Coordinates: 39.571238°N 2.648896°E
- Designer: Mariano Benlliure
- Material: Bronze, stone, marble
- Opening date: 13 December 1929
- Dedicated to: Antonio Maura

The Monument to Antonio Maura is an instance of public art in Palma de Mallorca, Spain. Designed by Mariano Benlliure, it consists of a sculptural ensemble dedicated to Antonio Maura.

== History and description ==
The monument was funded by popular subscription, and the design was awarded to Mariano Benlliure. The standing bronze statue of Antonio Maura, depicted in oratorical attitude, tops off the stone pedestal. Placed below Maura, an allegory of Truth made of white marble completes the ensemble. Truth is depicted pointing at a cartouche reading "antonio maura igualó con la vida el pensamiento" ("Antonio Maura equaled thought with [his] life"), adapted from a verse from Andrés Fernández de Andrada's Epístola moral a Fabio.

The monument was unveiled at its location in the Plaça del Mercat on 13 December 1929, on occasion of the 4th anniversary of the death of Maura. The statue was toppled and damaged on 11 November 2014 by the fall of a nearby ficus. After undergoing a restoration process, the statue returned to the Plaça del Mercat a year later.
