= Monument to Maria Christina of Bourbon (Madrid) =

Monument in Madrid

Maria Christina of Bourbon
- María Cristina de Borbón
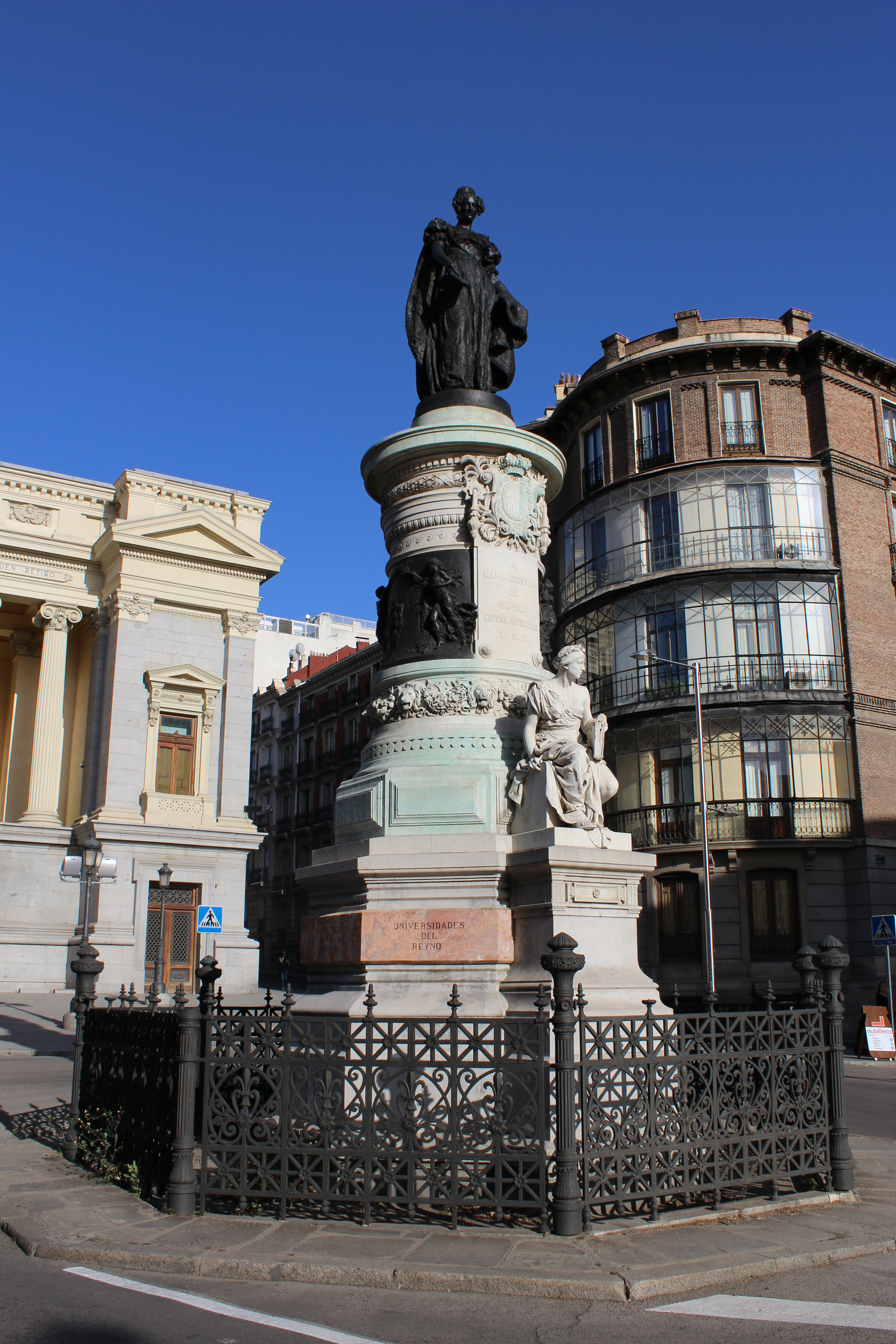
- Interactive map of Maria Christina of Bourbon
- Location: Calle de Felipe IV, Madrid, Spain
- Coordinates: 40.415252°N 3.690414°W
- Designer: Mariano Benlliure (sculptor); Miguel Aguado (architect)
- Material: Bronze, limestone, marble
- Opening date: 25 June 1893
- Dedicated to: Maria Christina of Bourbon–Two Sicilies

The monument to Maria Christina of Bourbon (Spanish: María Cristina de Borbón) is an instance of public art in Madrid, Spain. Designed by Mariano Benlliure and consisting of a bronze statue of the aforementioned queen consort and regent of Spain and a stone pedestal with additional sculptural elements, the monument lies in front of the Casón del Buen Retiro.

== History and description ==
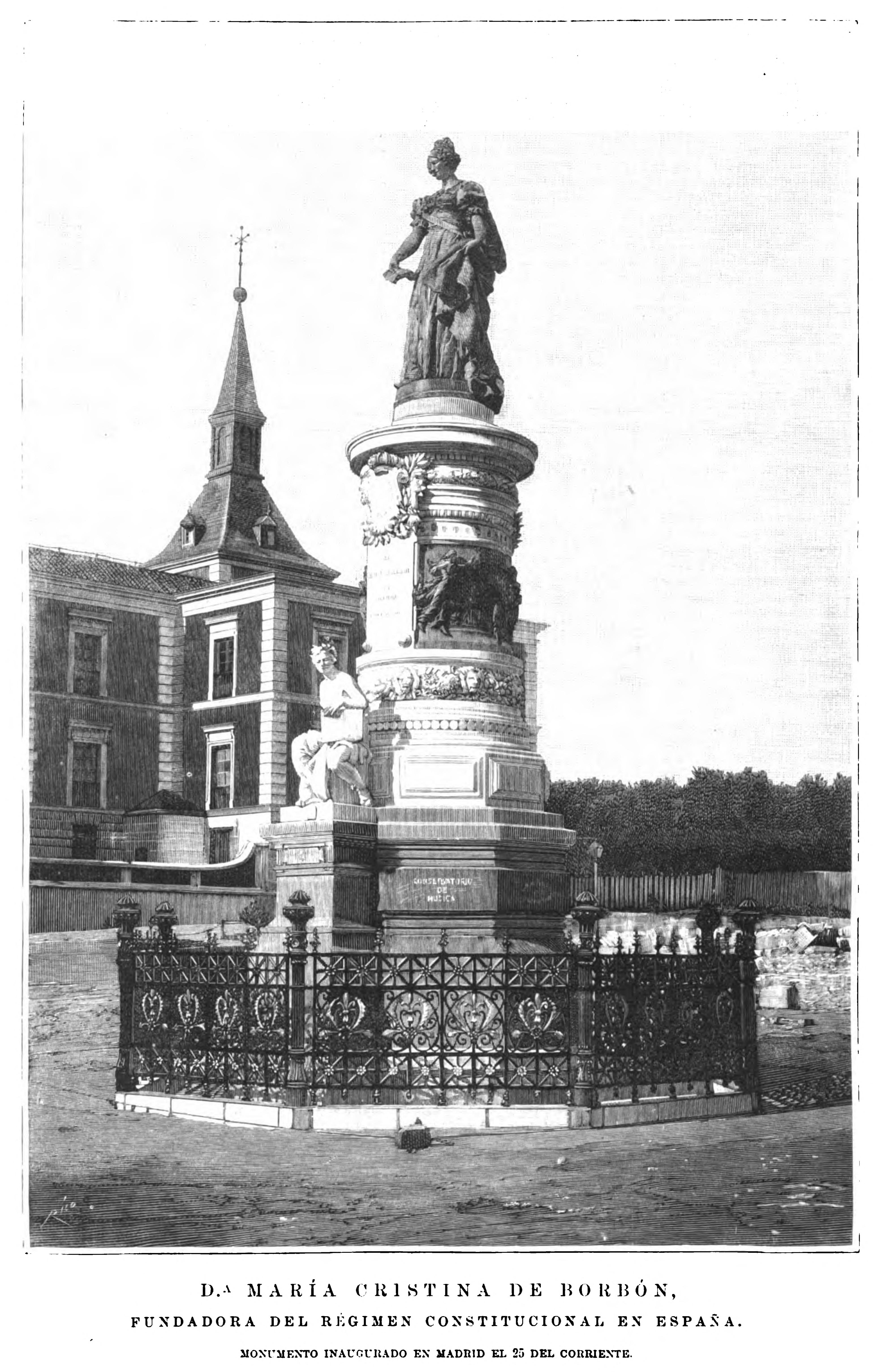
Engraving by Bernardo Rico published in the cover of La Ilustración Española y Americana on 30 June 1903 to account for the inauguration

Lobbied by General Manuel Pavía y Lacy, the project for the monument was awarded to the architect Miguel Aguado and to the sculptor Mariano Benlliure.

The lower body serving as basement follows a polygonal shape, displaying a number of inscriptions commemorating several feats of the rule of Maria Christina: "conservatorio de música", "decreto de amnistía", "ministerio de fomento"; "estatuto de 1834"; "ciencias, artes y oficios"; "convención de vergara", "universidades del reyno".

The pedestal lies above the basement; similar to the monument dedicated to another female individual such as Bárbara de Braganza's, a borderless cylindrical pedestal was employed. The lower part of the pedestal features a circular frieze with lion heads and garlands. The (frontal) part of the pedestal facing west displays a cartouche reading "a maría cristina de borbón. españa reconocida") ("To Maria Christina of Bourbon. A recognised Spain"), while the part of the pedestal behind the queen's back features another cartouche reading "1893". The flanks of the pedestal feature two reliefs illustrating the 1839 Embrace of Vergara and Maria Christina signing the 1832 decree of amnesty (a document in favour of the political exiles who had fled from the absolutist crackdown of her husband King Ferdinand VII, in her role as governing queen during the illness of Ferdinand VII, preceding the latter's final demise in 1833).

The monument is topped by the bronze statue representing a full body figure of Maria Christina, holding the Royal Statute with her right hand while grabbing her mantle with the left hand.

Below the Queen, seated on the pedestal, there is a marble classicist statue representing a female allegory of History, depicted with a naked nipple while holding a book that reads historia ("History").

It was unveiled on 25 June 1893.
