= Monument to Primo de Rivera (Jerez) =

Monument in Spain

Miguel Primo de Rivera
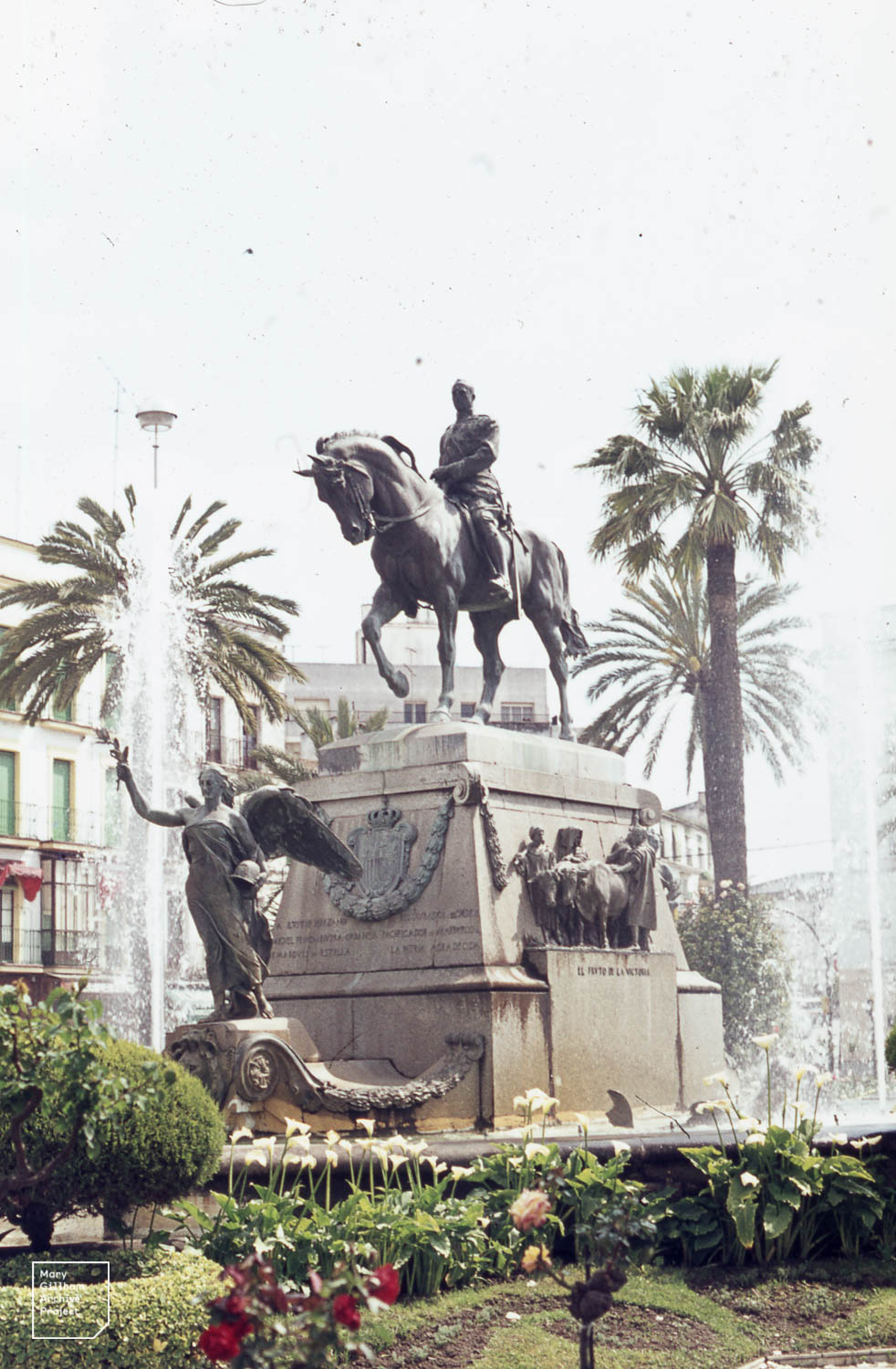
- 36.68153°N 6.137933°W
- Location: Jerez de la Frontera, Spain
- Designer: Mariano Benlliure
- Material: Bronze, stone
- Opening date: 29 September 1929
- Dedicated to: Miguel Primo de Rivera

The monument to Primo de Rivera is an instance of public art in Jerez de la Frontera, Spain. It consists of a bronze equestrian statue of Miguel Primo de Rivera, on top of a sculptural ensemble placed inside a fountain. It lies at the centre of the Plaza del Arenal.

== History and description ==
The monument was proposed in December 1923 by municipal councillor Antonio Montilla Rivero after the September 1923 coup d'etat, and the proposal was unanimously accepted. The managing committee of the monument was appointed in 1925. The monument was funded via popular subscription. The design of the monument was awarded to Mariano Benlliure.

Building works started on 2 October 1928. Benlliure reportedly used a horse from the regiment of Hussars of La Princesa as model for the equine figure. The front side of the pedestal features a coat of arms of Spain and an inscription reading: "al ilustre jerezano, restaurador del orden, miguel primo de Rivera y orbaneja, pacificador de marruecos y marqués de estella. la patria agradecida." ("to the illustrious jerezano, restorer of order, Miguel Primo de Rivera y Orbaneja, Peacemaker of Morocco and Marquis of Estella. The grateful homeland").

A winged Victory emerges ahead of the front side of the pedestal, grabbing a laurel branch with her right hand and a Pickelhaube general's helmet with her left arm. Both lateral sides of the pedestal feature sculptural compositions. The right-hand one, with the "estudiando el definitivo plan de avance" inscription ("studying the ultimate breakthrough plan"), consists of a meeting of generals around Primo de Rivera, also attended by Sanjurjo, Despujols, Fernández Pérez, Saro and Admiral Guerra. The left-hand side of the pedestal features an sculptural ensemble with five moors working the land with two oxen, reading "el punto de la victoria" ("the point of victory").

The backside of the monument incorporates an allegory of Peace or Plentifulness, holding cereal spikes, with two cornucopias at her feet, as well as a bronze relief consisting of an effigy of Miguel's brother Fernando—fallen in Monte Arruit in 1921—put inside a medallion bordered by laurel wreaths, with an inscription below reading "honrando a sus héroes" ("honoring its heroes").

It was unveiled on 29 September 1929, during a ceremony attended by the dictator himself.

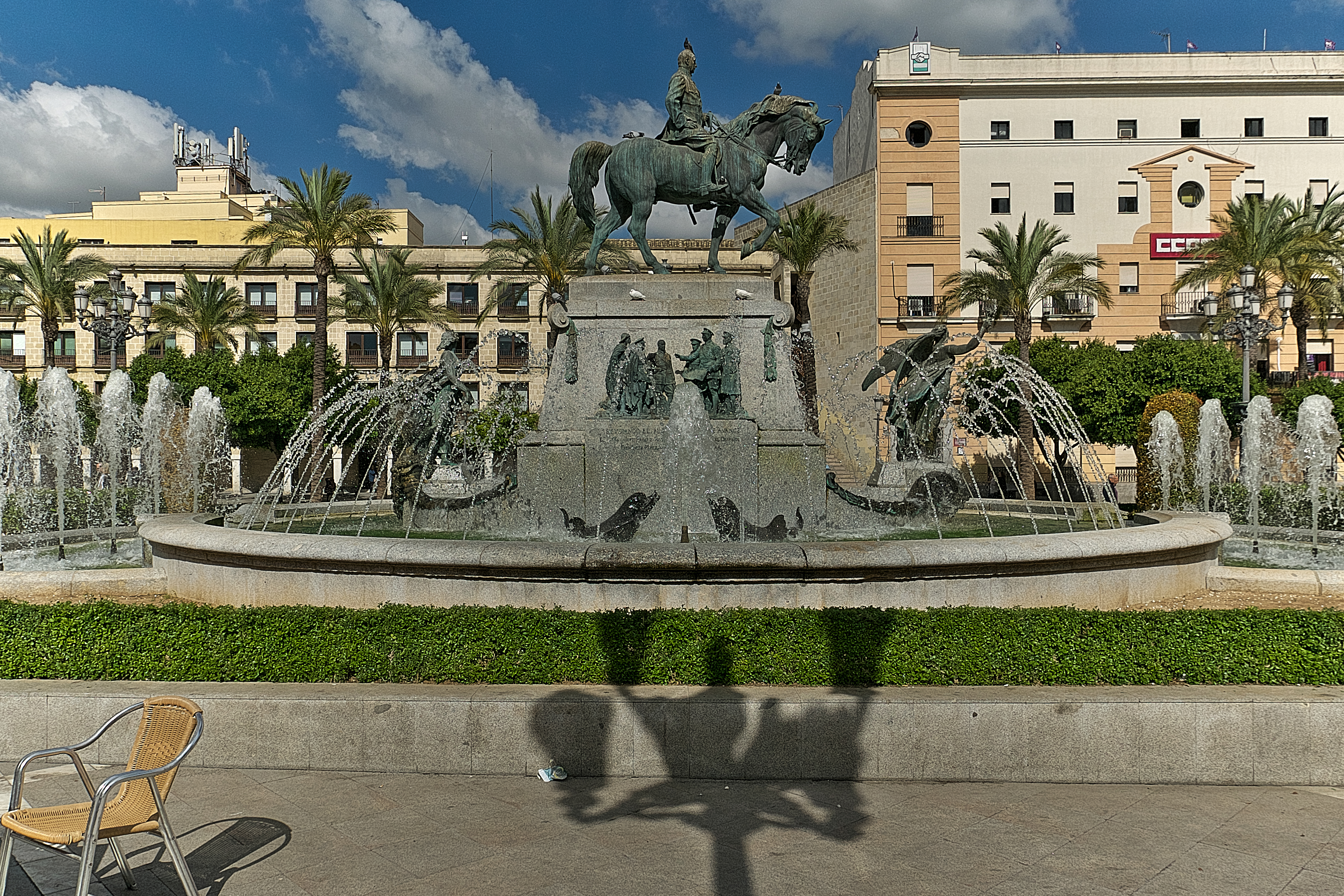
Lateral side, featuring the meeting of generals

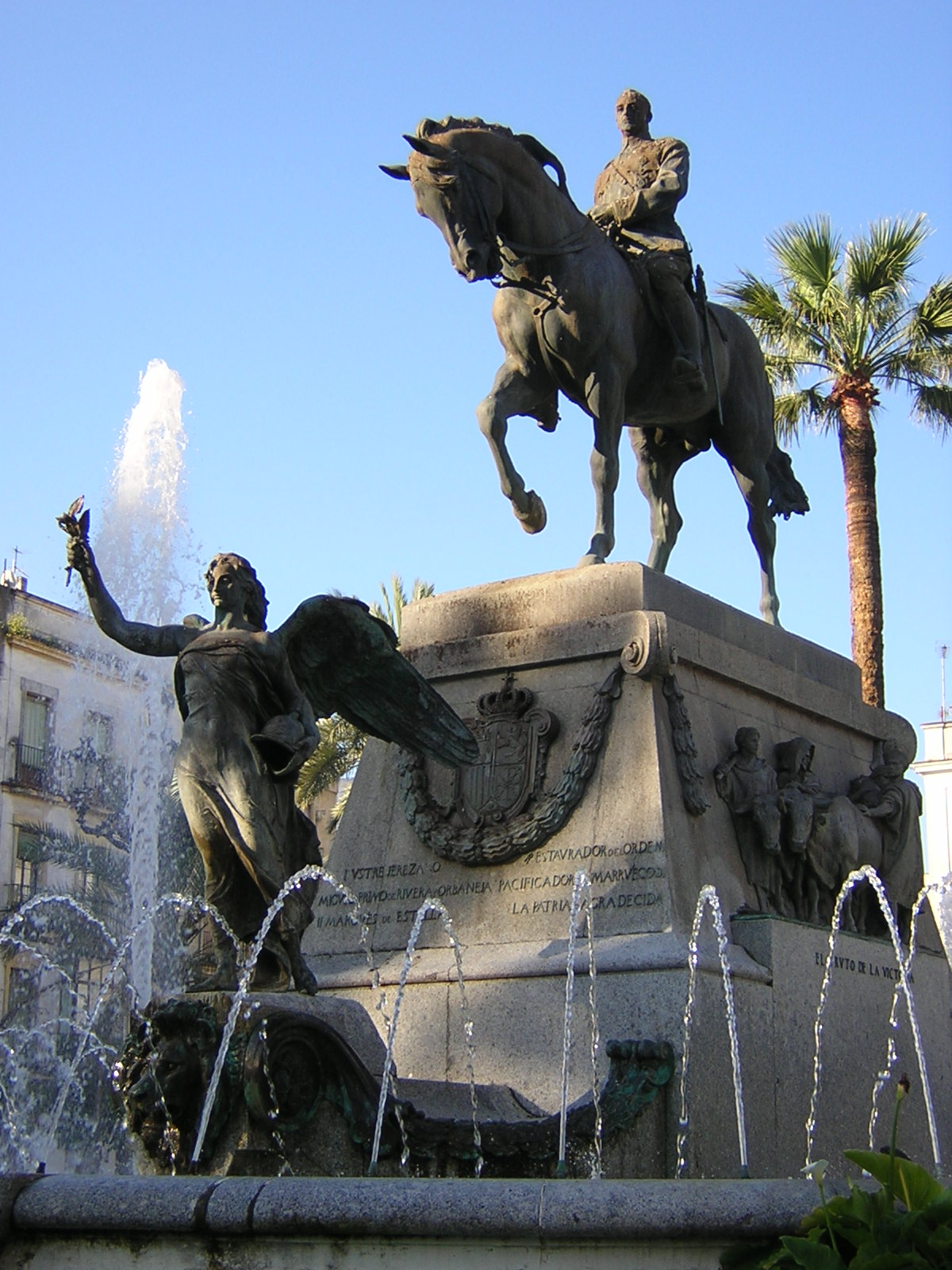
Closer view of the monument featuring the winged victory
