= Monument to Isabella the Catholic (Granada) =

1892 monument in Granada, Spain

Isabella the Catholic
- Isabel la Católica
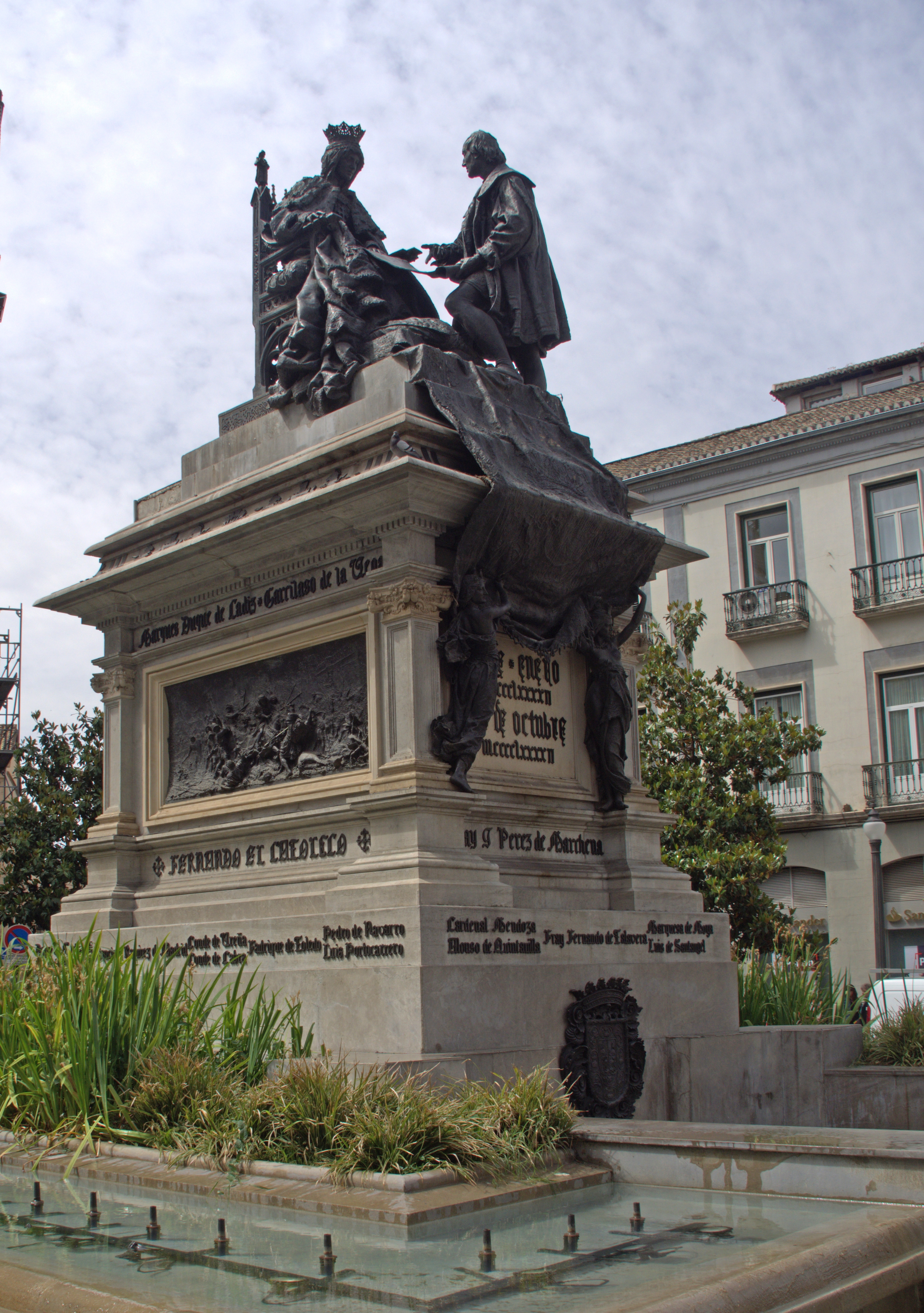
- 37.175649°N 3.597444°W
- Location: Plaza de Isabel la Católica, Granada, Spain
- Designer: Mariano Benlliure
- Material: Bronze, stone
- Opening date: 2 November 1892; 132 years ago
- Dedicated to: Isabella I of Castile, Christopher Columbus, Columbian exploration of the Americas

The Monument to Isabella the Catholic (Spanish: Monumento a Isabel la Católica) also known as the Monumento a Isabel la Católica y Colón ("Monument to Isabella the Catholic and Columbus") or monumento del IV Centenario ("Monument of the 400th Anniversary") is an instance of public art in Granada, Spain. Designed by Mariano Benlliure, it consists of a bronze sculptural group depicting a meeting of Isabella I of Castile with Christopher Columbus.

== History and description ==
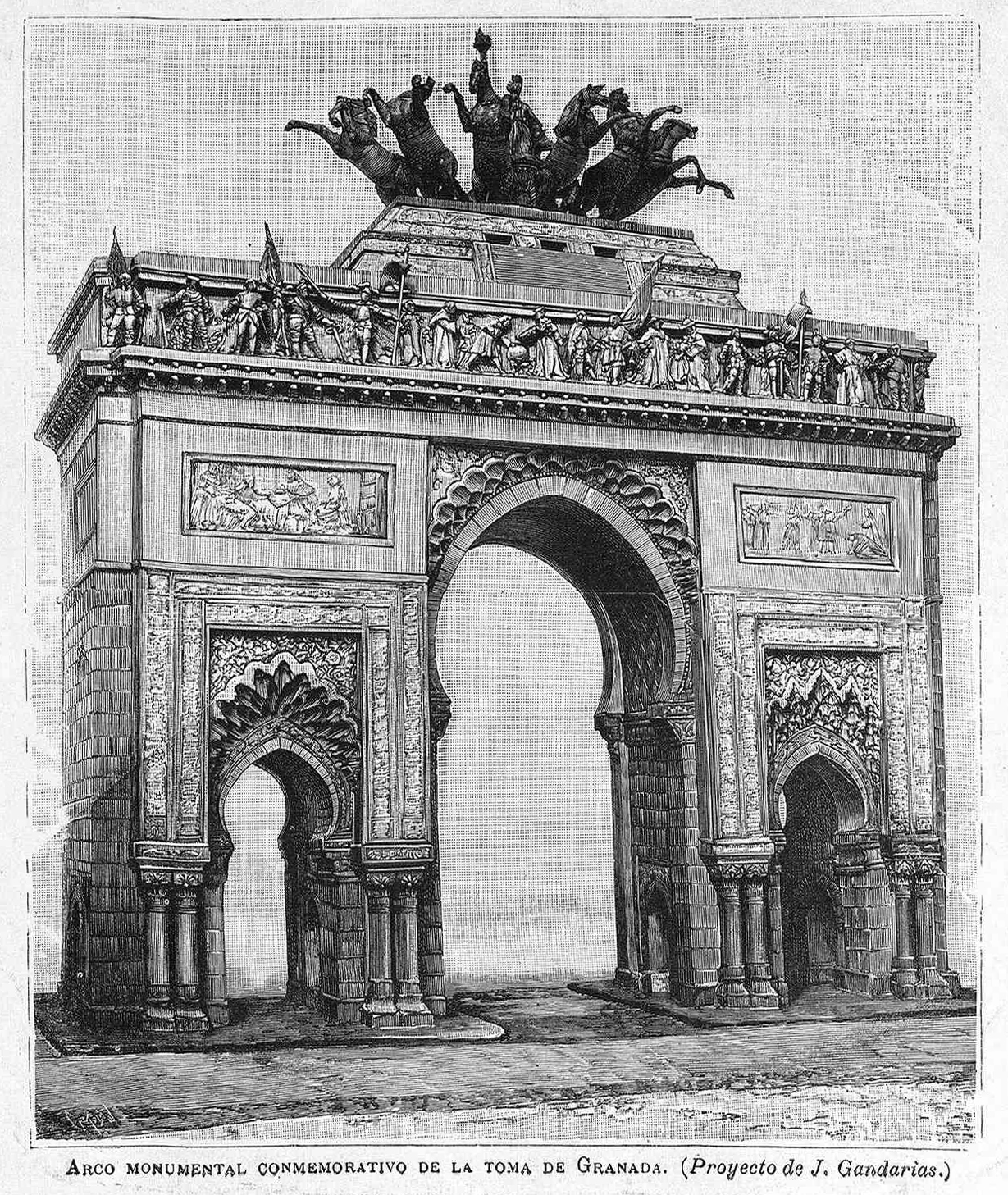
A nearly 50 metre high triumphal arch, an earlier bombastic project by Justo de Gandarias discarded because of budget shortcomings.

By 1890, several Spanish cities had already set arrangements in motion in order to erect their own commemorative monument to the 400th anniversary of the first voyage of Christopher Columbus to the Americas.

In the case of Granada, a bombastic triumphal arch featuring a mashup of Aztec, Hispano–Arab and Renaissance styles sketched by Justo de Gandarias was tentatively proposed as project for the commemoration of the 400th anniversary. However, even after asking for funds to the Government of Spain, the Ayuntamiento de Granada did not have even a fraction of the budget needed to carry out such an expensive large-scale endeavor, so a public contest for a new project was called. After the contest was declared void, Prime Minister Cánovas del Castillo personally took action and awarded the design to Mariano Benlliure.

The bronze sculptural group topping off the monument depicts a meeting of Columbus with Queen Isabella, seated on her throne. The upper part of the pedestal serves as a staircase on which Columbus stops to bow to the queen. The sculptural group was also reportedly set to include a figure of Boabdil, but the idea just fell apart.

The commemoration of the 400th anniversary utterly failed; it did not even take place on 12 October as it was intended in the first place. Queen regent Maria Christina of Habsburg–Lorraine refused to travel to Granada to inaugurate the monument. This caused a revolt in the city that ended with fires, riots and barricades. With the town in arms, after setting fire to the withered ornamental arches that had been prepared time ago to welcome the royal retinue, the scorned people of Granada informally unveiled the monument on 2 November 1892, then placed in its original location at the Paseo del Salón.

Following a 1961 resolution, the monument was relocated in 1962 by the Ayuntamiento de Granada to its current placement at the Plaza de Isabel la Católica, not far from the burial place of Isabella in the Royal Chapel of Granada.

== See also ==
- List of monuments and memorials to Christopher Columbus
