= Monument to General Cassola =

Monument in Granada

General Manuel Cassola
- General Manuel Cassola
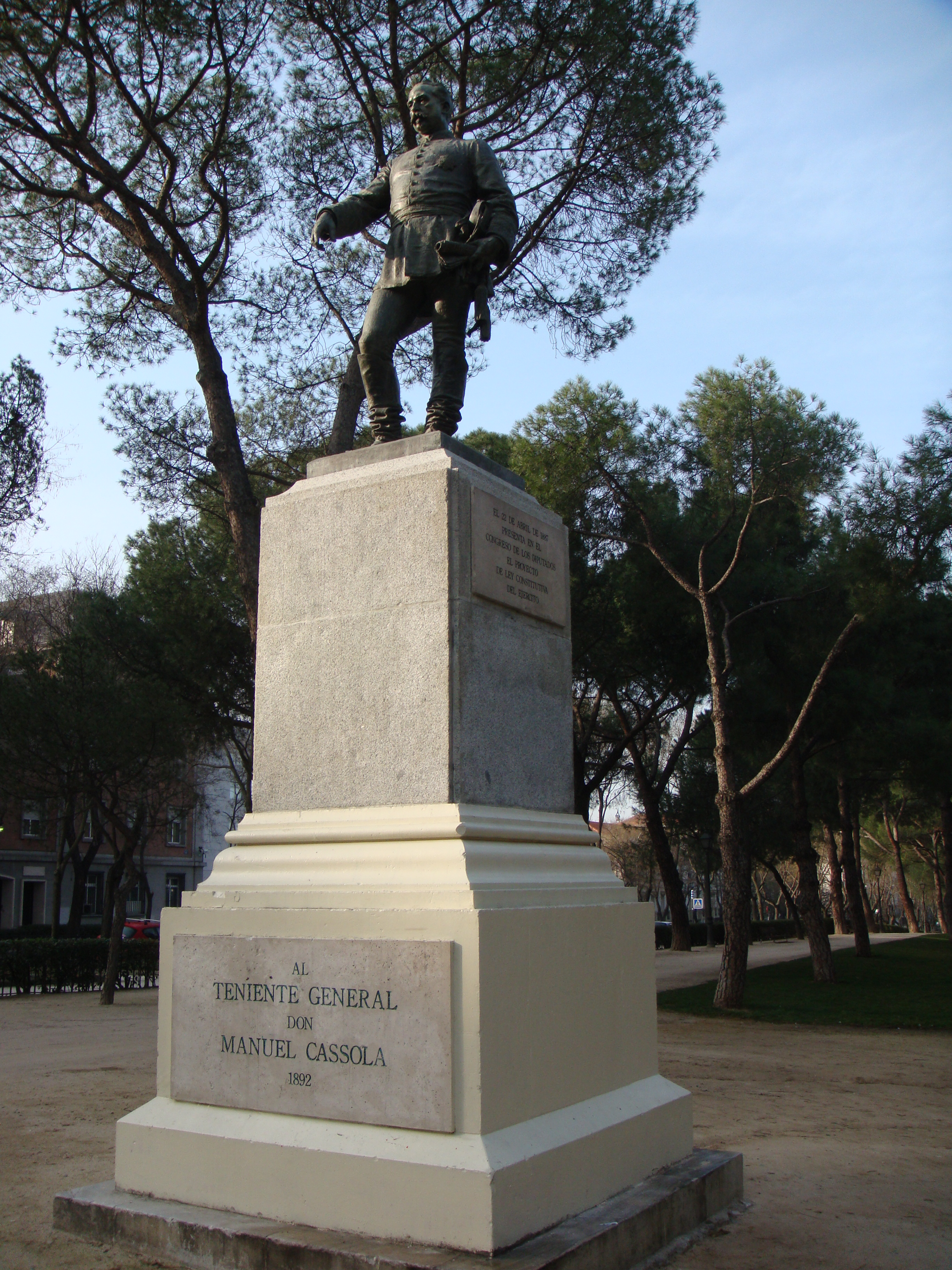
- 40.434616°N 3.72134°W
- Location: Parque del Oeste, Madrid, Spain
- Designer: Mariano Benlliure
- Material: Bronze, stone
- Opening date: 7 December 1892
- Dedicated to: Manuel Cassola

The Monument to Lieutenant General Manuel Cassola is an instance of public art in Madrid, Spain. It consists of a bronze statue of Manuel Cassola designed by Mariano Benlliure topping off a stone pedestal.

== History and description ==
The monument was funded via popular subscription among the military officers, and the bronze came from handles of sword and sabres donated by the subscriptors. The design was awarded to Mariano Benlliure.

The bronze full body figure of the general, in critical and reflective attitude, is depicted wearing a campaign uniform, extending his right arm forward, while grabbing a roll of paper with his left hand, a nod to his reform proposal in the form of the draft of the Ley Constitutiva del Ejército.

The four sides of the pedestal displayed inscriptions reading "al teniente general d. manuel cassola, 1892" ("to Lieutenant General Don Manuel Cassola, 1892"), "el 22 de abril de 1887 presenta en el congreso de los diputados el proyecto de ley constitutiva del ejército" ("on 22 April 1887, he presented to the Congress of Deputies the draft of the Constituent Law of the Army", "todo por la patria y por el ejército" ("all for the country and for the army") and "el ejército debe estar organizado de suerte que nada tenga que temer de la influencia ni que esperar del favor" ("the army must be organized so that it has nothing to fear from influence nor expect from favor").

It was unveiled at its original location at the gardens of the Calle de Ferraz (near the Cuartel de la Montaña) on 7 December 1892, during a ceremony in which the General Borrero intervened as speaker.

The monument was moved for the first time to the plaza de Mariano de Cavia (near El Retiro) in 1929. Over the years, the monument would end up at its current location in the Parque del Oeste.
