= Monument to Álvaro de Bazán (Madrid) =

Monument in Madrid

Don Álvaro de Bazán
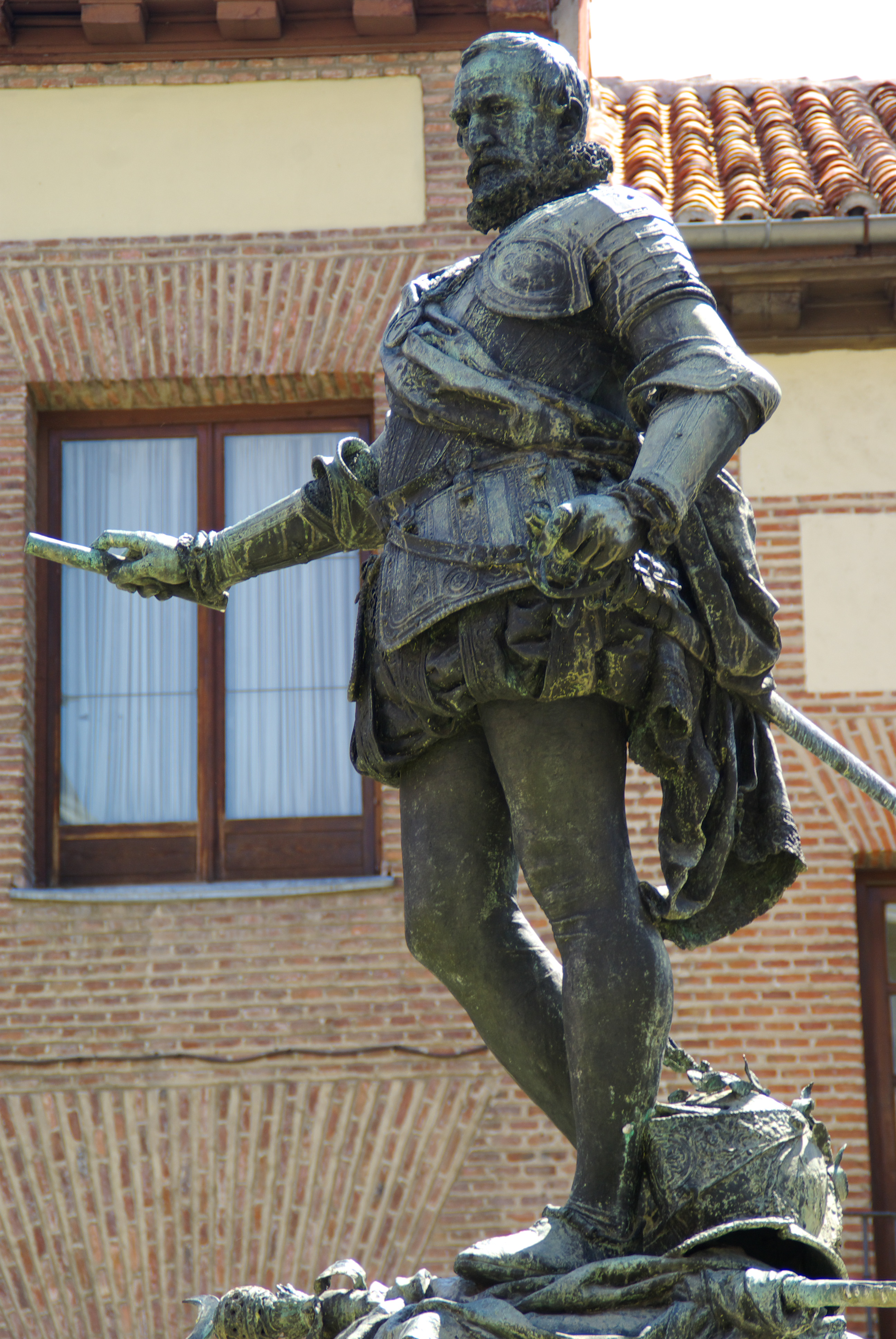
- Location: Plaza de la Villa, Madrid, Spain
- Coordinates: 40.41512°N 3.710399°W
- Designer: Mariano Benlliure (sculptor); Miguel Aguado (architect)
- Material: Bronze, stone
- Opening date: 19 December 1891
- Dedicated to: Álvaro de Bazán

The Monument to Álvaro de Bazán is an instance of public art in Madrid, Spain. Located at the Plaza de la Villa, it consists of a bronze sculpture designed by Mariano Benlliure representing Álvaro de Bazán—a noted 16th century Admiral of the Spanish Navy once described by Cervantes as "father of soldiers, lightning of war, fortunate and never defeated captain"— put on top of a stone pedestal.

== History and description ==
The erection of the monument was lobbied by Luis Vidart and funded via popular subscription. The project was awarded to Mariano Benlliure. The statue was cast in bronze in Rome at Crescenzi's foundry. The stone pedestal was made of grey marble from Sierra Elvira (province of Granada). Miguel Aguado worked as architect.

The standing full-body figure of the Álvaro de Bazán lies on top of the pedestal as the leading element of the sculptural ensemble. He is depicted wearing armor, while grabbing the handle of his sword with his left hand and wielding a staff of command with his right hand. Lying below the Admiral and also cast in bronze, the ensemble features a laureate helmet and a shattered Turkish banner on which the Marquis of Santa Cruz steps.

Originally, the stone pedestal reportedly displayed four dolphins cast in bronze at the corners of its lower part, and, placed within a bronze palm leaf wreath at its front side an inscription in bronze reading: don álvaro de bazán. However, over the years, the pedestal would lose these secondary bronze items. The backside of the pedestal displays an inscription with a quote from some verses dedicated to Álvaro de Bazán by Lope de Vega:

el fiero turco en lepanto,
en la tercera el francés,
en todo el mar el inglés,
tuvieron de verme espanto.
Rey servido y patria honrada
dirán mejor quien he sido;
por la cruz de mi apellido
y con la cruz de mi espada"

—Lope de Vega

The fierce Turk in Lepanto,
in Terceira the French,
the English all over the sea,
they were scared to death to see me.
King served and country honoured
they'll say better who I've been;
by the cross of my surname
and with the cross of my sword"

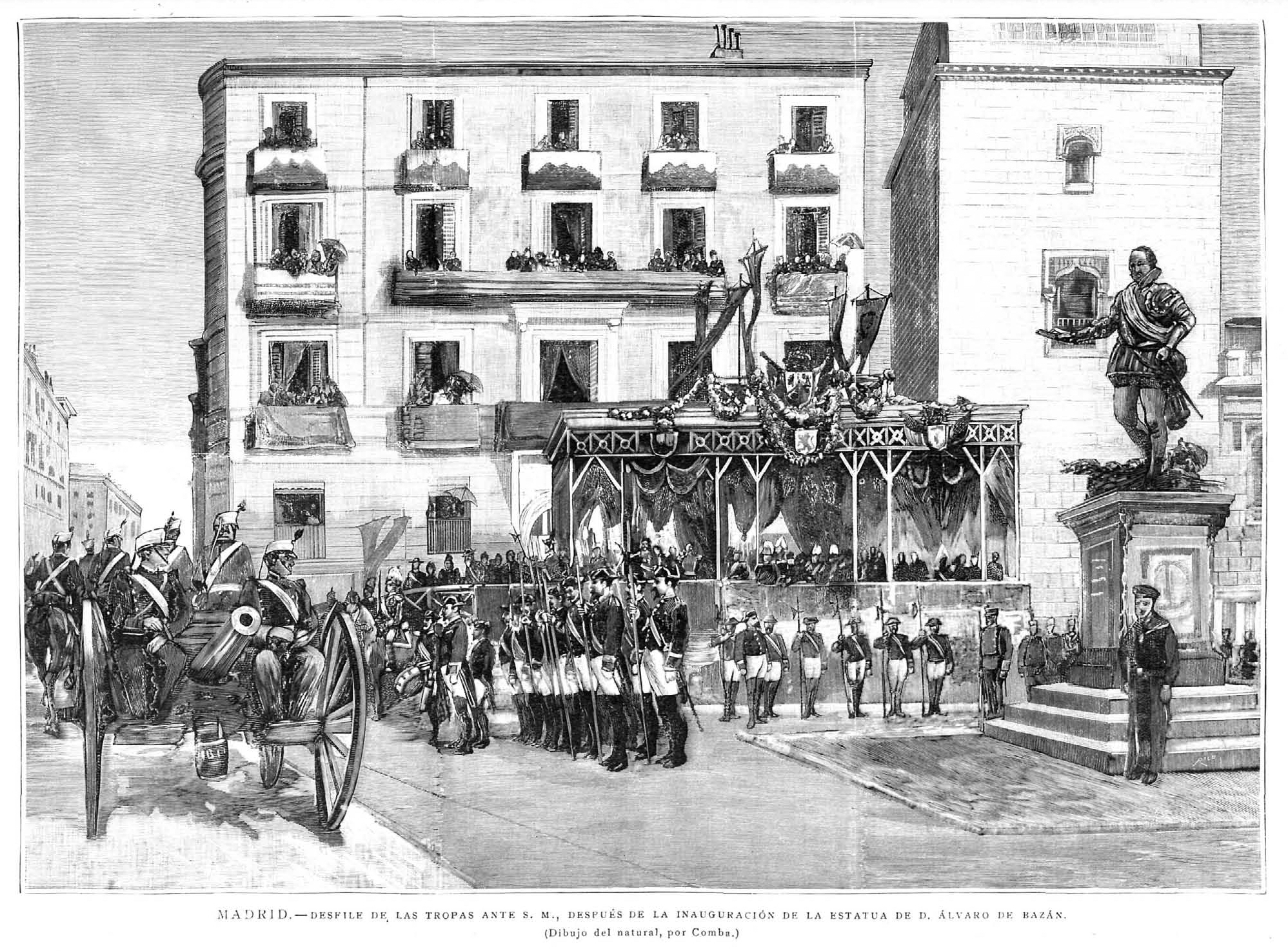
Drawing by Juan Comba depicting the inauguration of the monument in 1891.

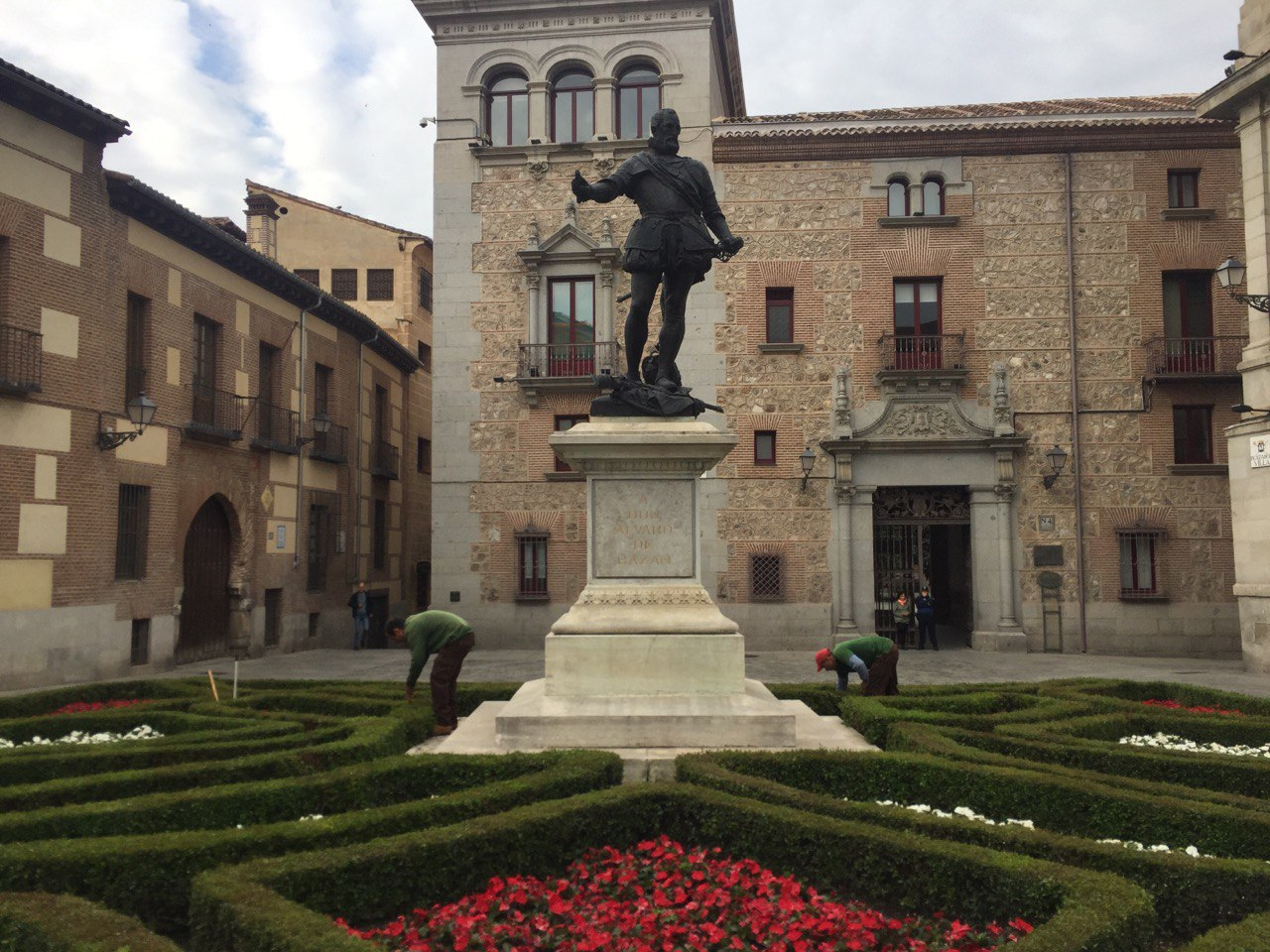
Alvaro Bazan monument in 2023

It was officially unveiled on 19 December 1891, at its location in the Plaza de la Villa, during a ceremony presided by queen regent Maria Christina of Habsburg-Lorraine. The inauguration was also attended by the Infanta Isabella, Alejandro Pidal y Mon, Prime Minister Antonio Cánovas del Castillo, a number of additional government ministers, several generals and members of the councils of the Ayuntamiento and the Provincial Deputation, among others.
