= Monument to Castelar (Madrid) =

Monument in Madrid, Spain

Castelar
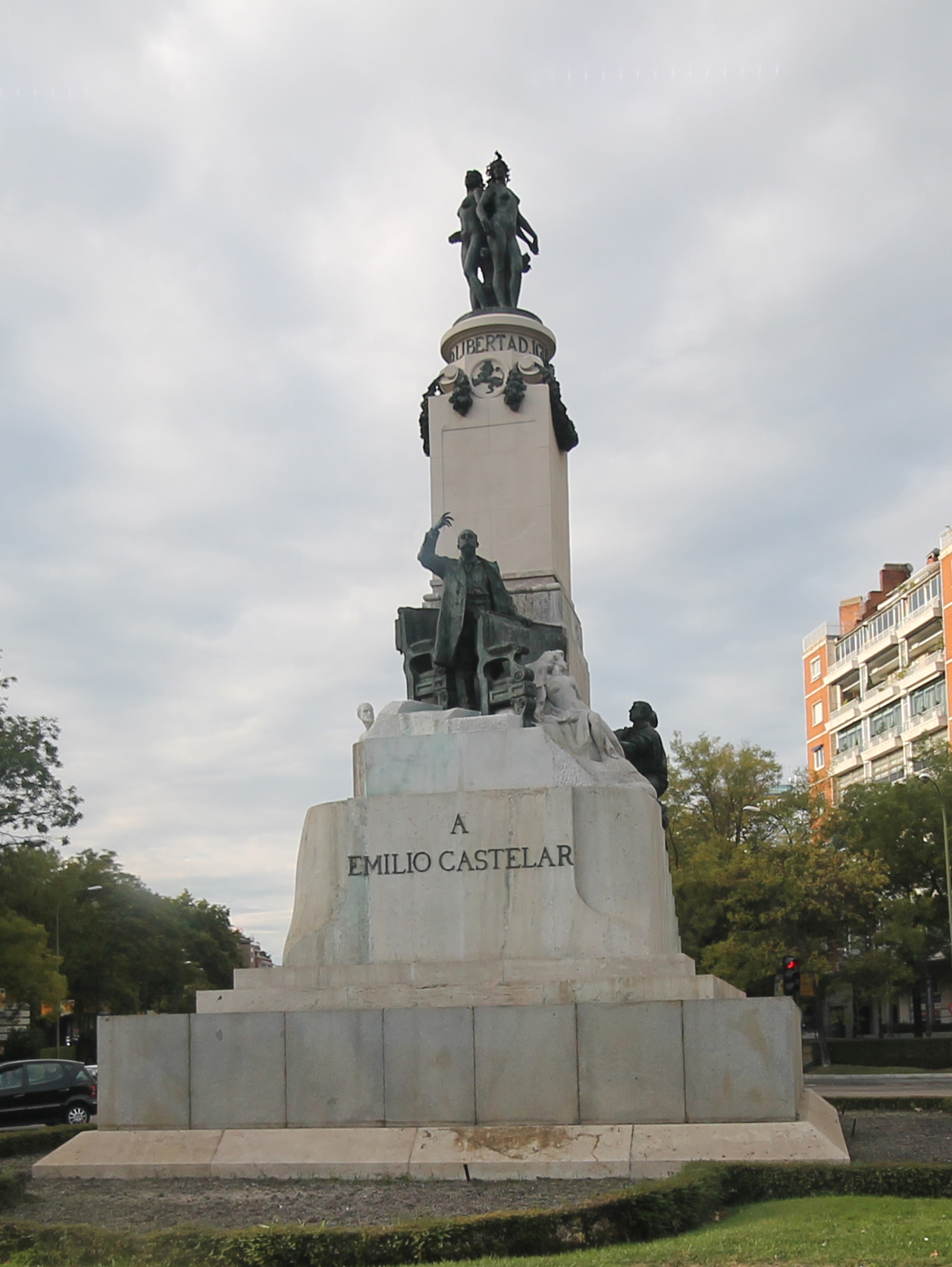
- Interactive map of Castelar
- Location: Glorieta de Emilio Castelar, Madrid, Spain
- Coordinates: 40.435219°N 3.688771°W
- Designer: Mariano Benlliure
- Material: Bronze, marble, limestone, granite
- Height: 12 m
- Opening date: 6 July 1908
- Dedicated to: Emilio Castelar

Castelar or the Monument to Castelar (Spanish: Monumento a Castelar) is an instance of public art in Madrid, Spain. A work by Mariano Benlliure, it is dedicated to Emilio Castelar, president of the First Spanish Republic. It lies on the centre of the namesake Glorieta de Emilio Castelar, a roundabout in the Paseo de la Castellana.

== History and description ==
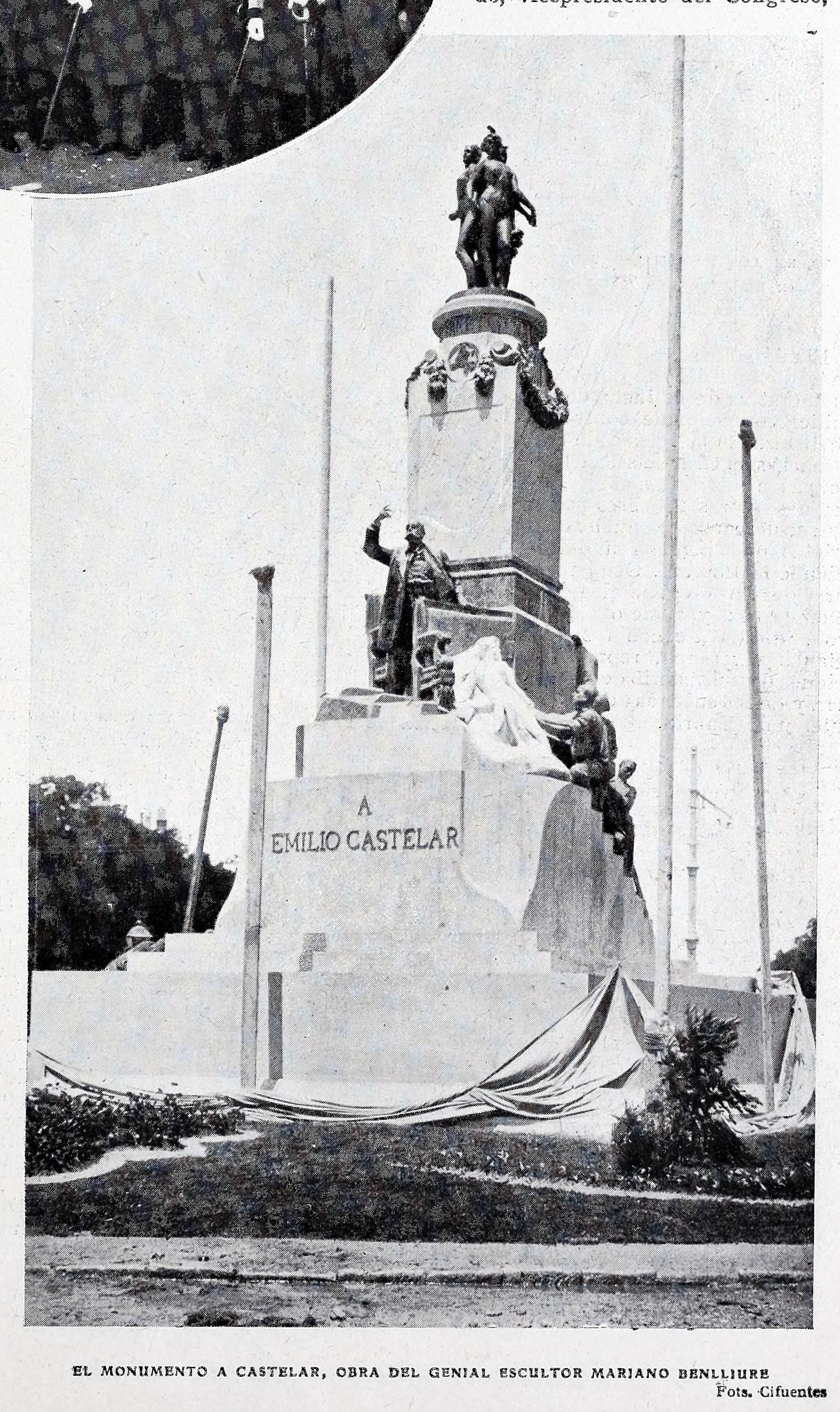
The freshly unveiled monument photographed by Cifuentes (Blanco y Negro, July 1908)

An initiative of the Spanish State, it was funded via popular subscription, receiving money from about 1,000 institutions and individual subscriptors from all over Spain as well as from Mexico, Argentina, France, England and Italy. The winning project was awarded to Mariano Benlliure in 1905 after a public contest.

An eloquent speaker, Castelar had distinguished himself during his lifetime as a defender of the Spanish nation and as voucher of freedom against slavery.

Following the description of Jacinto Octavio Picón in El Imparcial (5 July 1908), the monument can be described as follows:

Placed on a rectangular granite floor, there is a limestone block, on which there is a white marble basement that supports two bronze parliamentary benches. The bronze statue of Castelar—oratorical attitude, head high, with the right hand extended—lies on the middle, placed between the benches.

To the left of Castelar and a little further down there is a marble figure of a naked woman—The Truth—letting her head fall backwards. Castelar and the two bronze seats stand on a large dark reddish marble cube with two steps. On the left (to the right of Castelar), two white marble figures climb up: Cicero and Demosthenes, attracted by the figure of Castelar. On the right (to the left of Castelar), there is a staircase with three bronze figures representing a worker, a soldier and a student.

The lower backside is formed by a concave bronze relief commemorating Castelar's campaigns in favour of the abolition of slavery in the former Spanish colonies. It is composed of eight figures of men and women in an attitude of showing their broken chains, while above them the fragment of a speech by Castelar written in golden letters reads as follows: "Rise up, slaves, because you have a homeland".

The intermediate block at the back features a sculptural group composed of a cannon and an artillery soldier.

Emerging from the rest of the monument, the upper part of the monument—standing 12-metre high— is formed by a limestone parallelepiped. It is decorated by the arms of the Spanish coat of arms combined with pendants and garlands of foliage, and above them, there are three standing figures of naked women in which the sculptor has symbolized the three words, "Liberty, Equality and Fraternity", underpinning the Castelar's political creed.

The monument was unveiled on 6 July 1908.

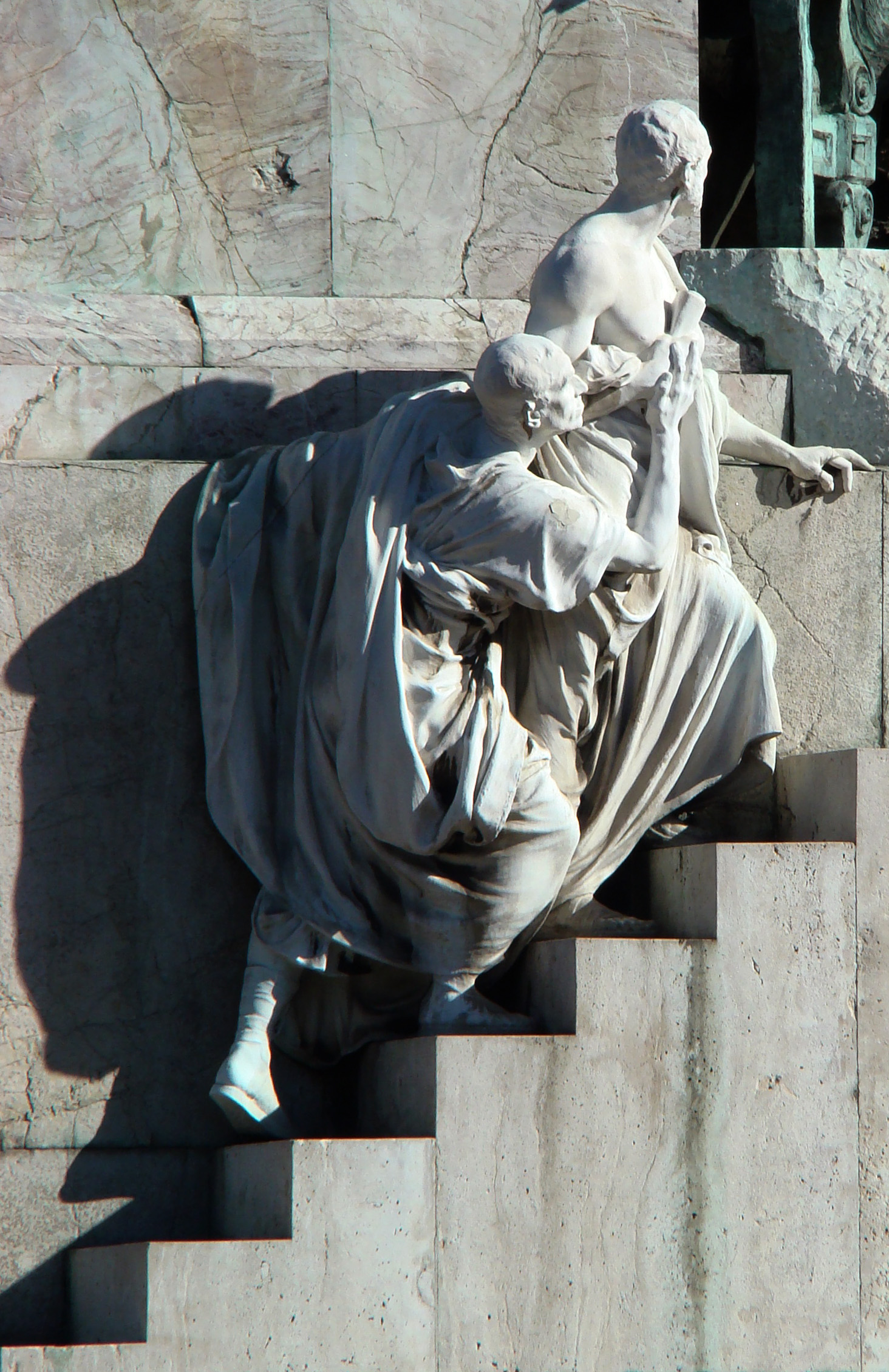
Cicero and Demosthenes

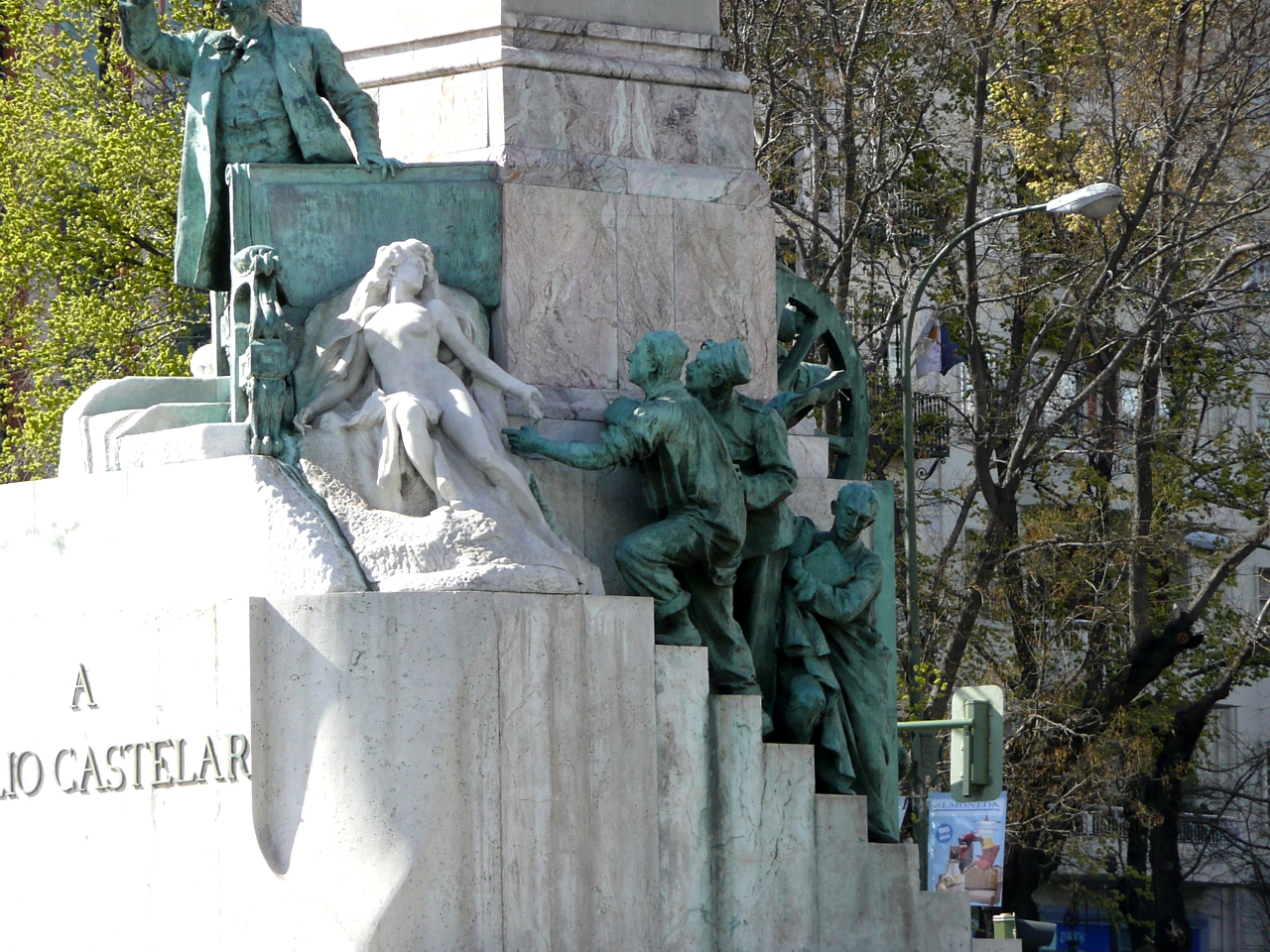
Student, soldier and worker

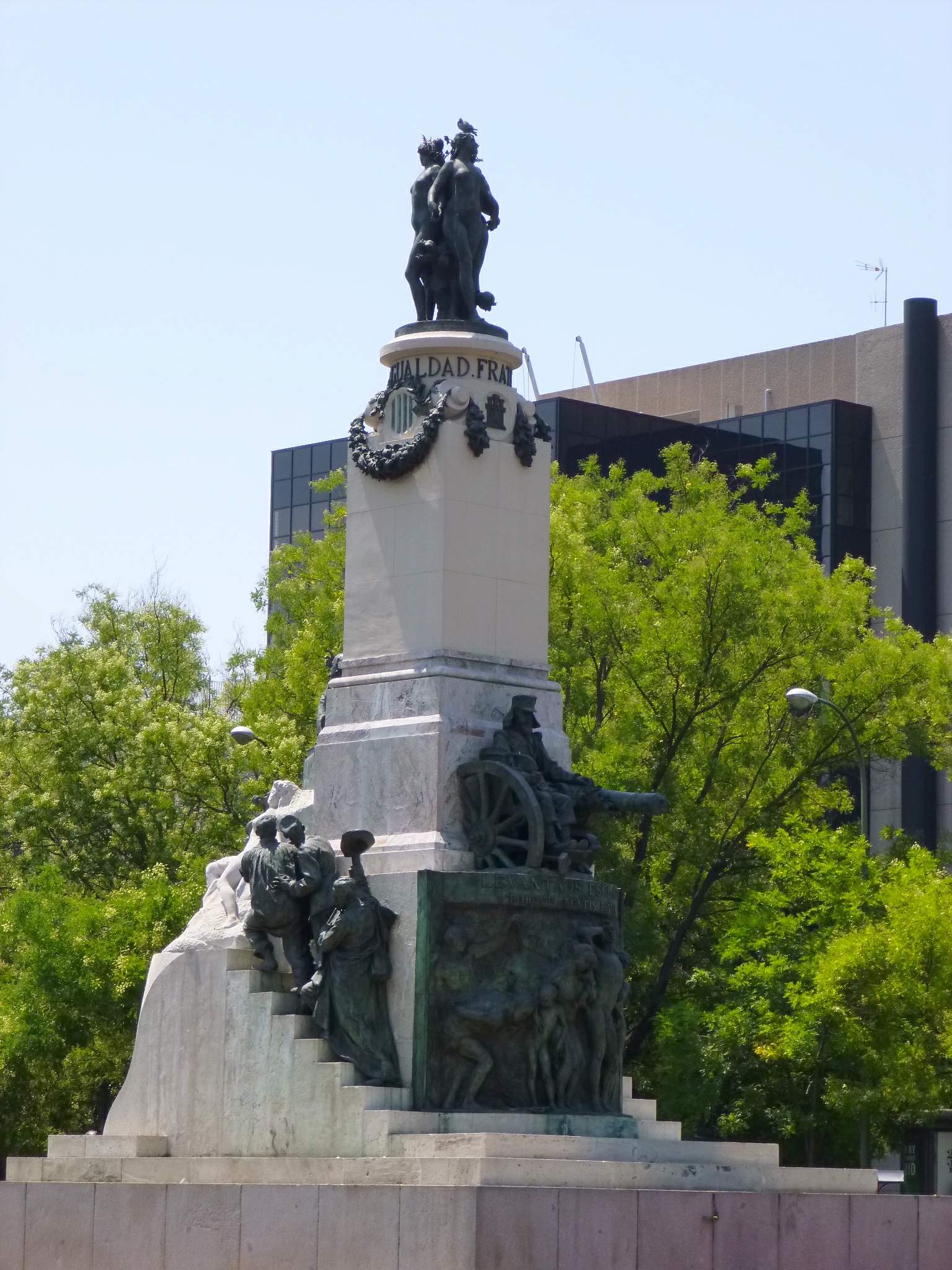
Backside view

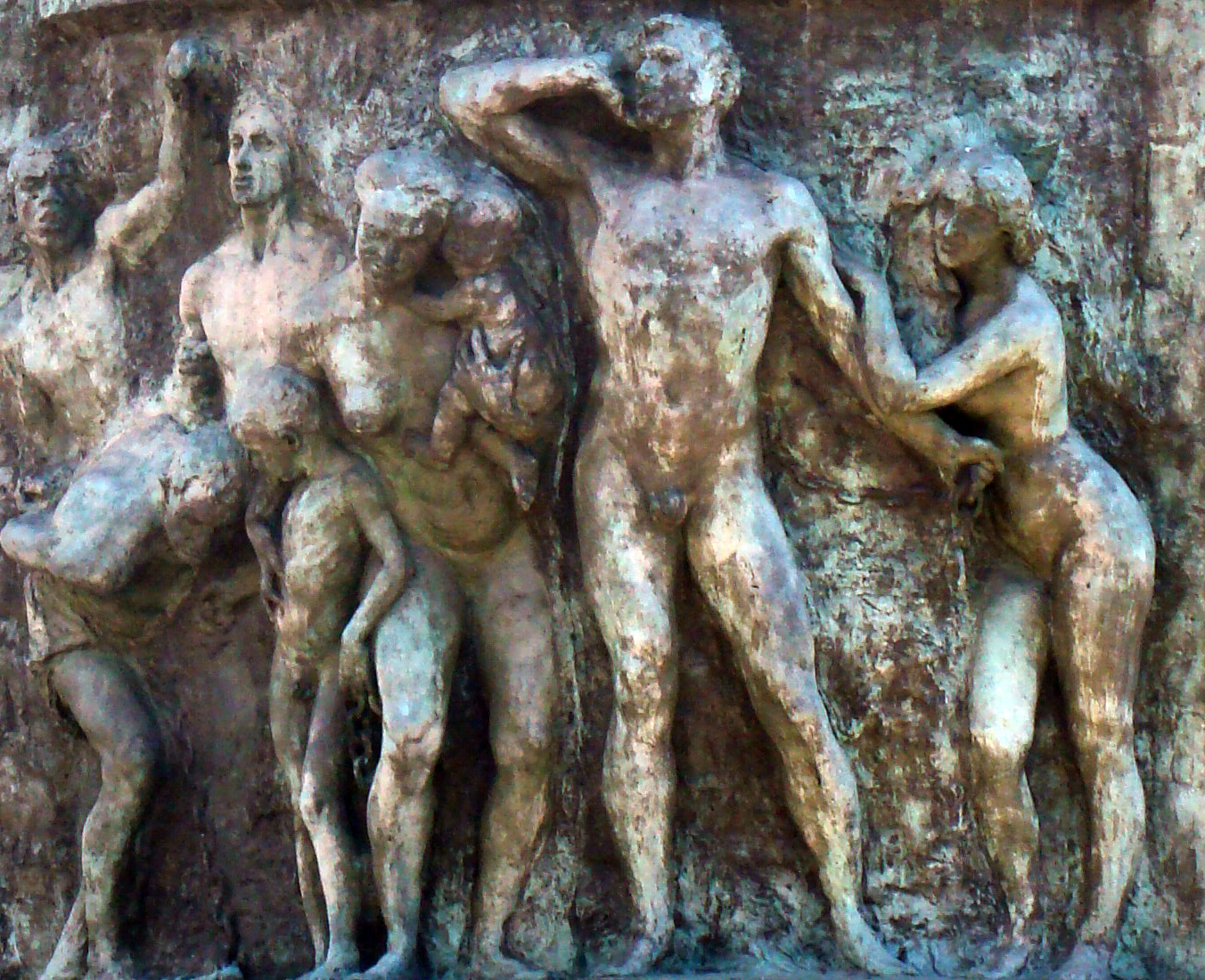
Relief of freed slaves
