= Mariano Benlliure =

Spanish sculptor (1862–1947)

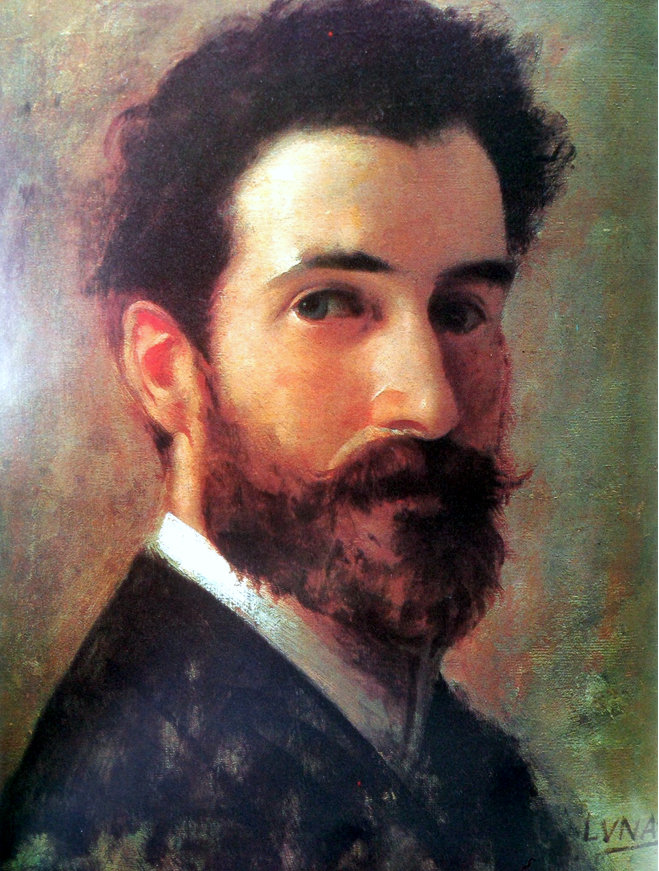
- Portrait of Mariano Benlliure in his youth by his friend, Filipino painter Juan Luna
- Born: Mariano Benlliure y Gil; 8 September 1862; Valencia, Spain
- Died: 9 November 1947 (aged 85); Madrid, Spain
- Known for: Sculpting, Painting
- Movement: Heroic realism, Neoclassicism

Signature
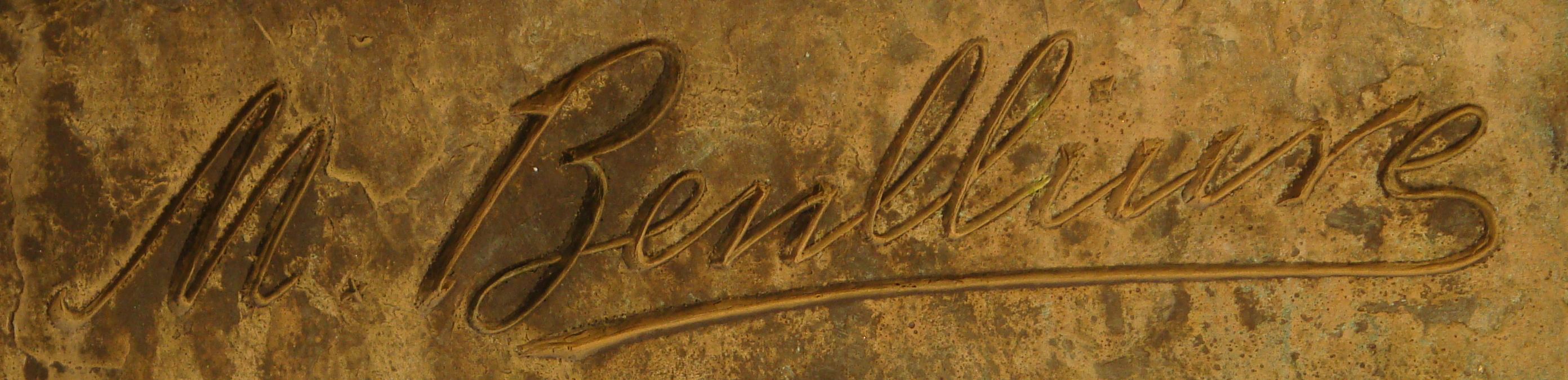

Mariano Benlliure y Gil (8 September 1862 – 9 November 1947) was a Spanish sculptor and medallist, who executed many public monuments and religious sculptures in Spain, working in a heroic realist style.

== Life and works ==
He was born in the Lower Street of the Carmen neighborhood of Valencia. His earliest sculptures featured bullfighting themes, modeled in wax and cast in bronze. At the age of thirteen he showed a wax modello of a picador at the Exposición Nacional de Bellas Artes, 1876. Pursuing the thought of becoming a painter, he went to Paris his expenses paid by his master, Francisco Domingo Marqués. A trip to Rome in 1879, revealing at first hand the sculptures of Michelangelo convinced him to be a sculptor. In 1887 he established himself permanently in Madrid, where in that year's Exposición Nacional his portrait sculpture of the painter Ribera won him a first-prize.

Benlliure's style is characterized by detailed naturalism allied to an impressionistic spontaneity. His portrait busts and public monuments are numerous, and include:

- the tomb of Práxedes Mateo Sagasta in the Pantheon of Illustrious Men, Madrid
- monument to José de San Martín, Lima, Peru
- the monument to Álvaro de Bazán, Plaza de la Villa, Madrid.
- the monument to Isabella the Catholic, Granada
- the monument to General Cassola, Parque del Oeste, Madrid
- the monument to Maria Christina of Bourbon, Madrid
- the bronze equestrian statue of the monument to Alfonso XII, in Madrid's El Retiro, the centerpiece of a memorial designed by architect José Grases Riera.
- the monument to Agustina de Aragón, in Zaragoza.
- the monument to Castelar, in Madrid.
- the monument to Arsenio Martínez Campos, in El Retiro.
- the monument to Miguel Primo de Rivera, in Jerez de la Frontera.
- the monument to Antonio Maura, in Palma de Mallorca.
- the monument to Cuba, in El Retiro, with help from Miquel Blay, Francisco Asorey and Juan Cristóbal (completed by 1930, unveiled in 1952).
- the monument to Arthur Walsh Fergusson in the Philippines.
- the bronze bust of his good friend Juan Luna, a Filipino political activist, who also painted a portrait of Benlliure. It was completed in plaster in 1884. It was gifted by Spanish donors to the Philippine government on October 12, 1922 and kept in the National Library of the Philippines. It was believed lost during the Battle of Manila in 1945 with the destruction of the National Library. It was rediscovered in September 2023 during an auction event and was turned over to the National Museum of the Philippines.

Benlliure was the protector of the Cadiz sculptor Juan Luis Vassallo, taking charge of the reproduction of the work La Jeroma, which in 1927 had won first prize at the Casino. Mariano Benlliure was the engraver of the first Peseta coins issued in 1947 showing the head of Franco.

He was depicted on the Spanish 500 ptas banknote in the 1950s, with his sculpture "Sepulcro De Gayarre en el Roncal" on the reverse.

His brothers José and Juan Antonio were also painters.

== Works ==
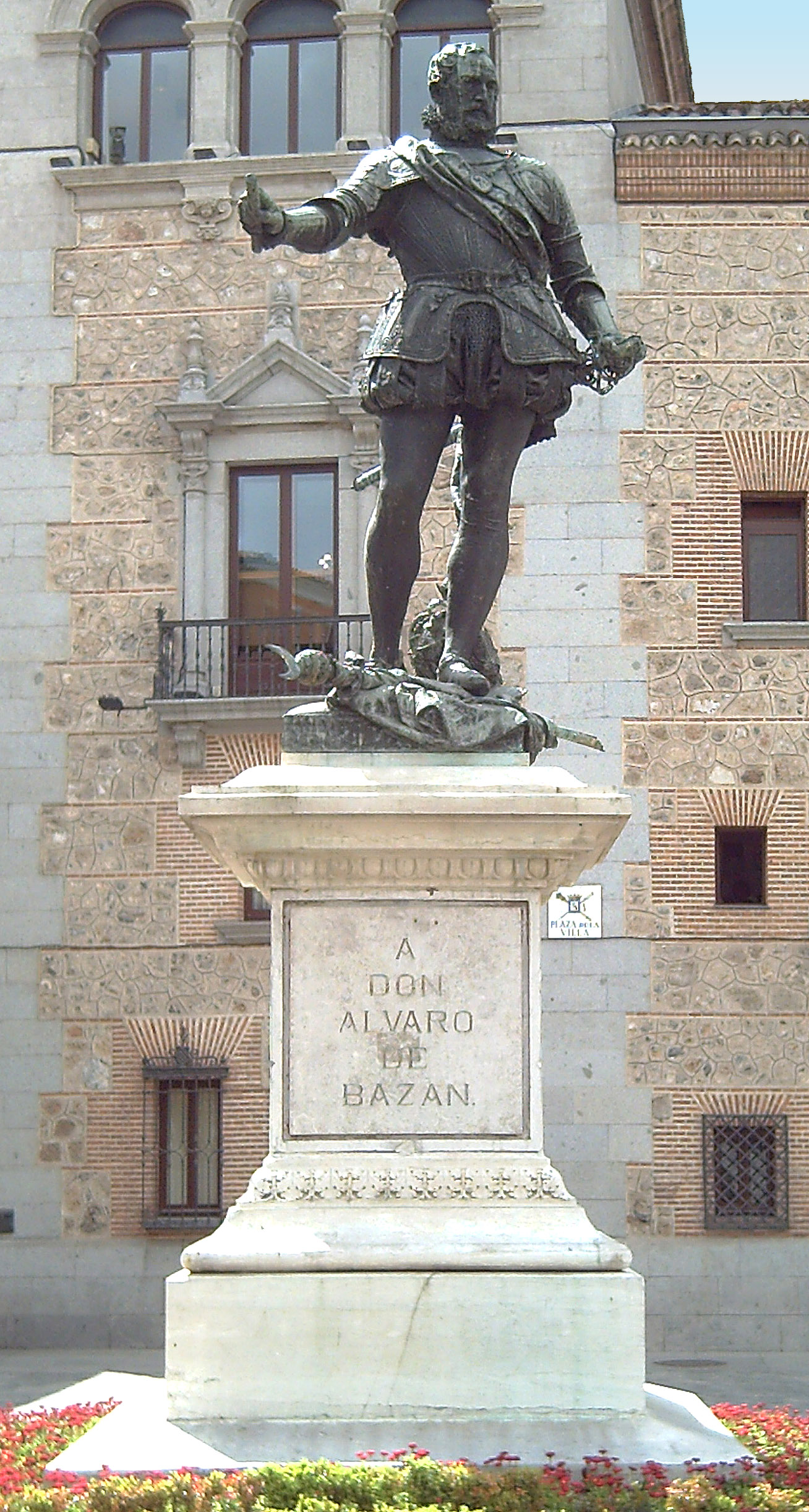
Monument to Álvaro de Bazán, 1891 (Madrid)

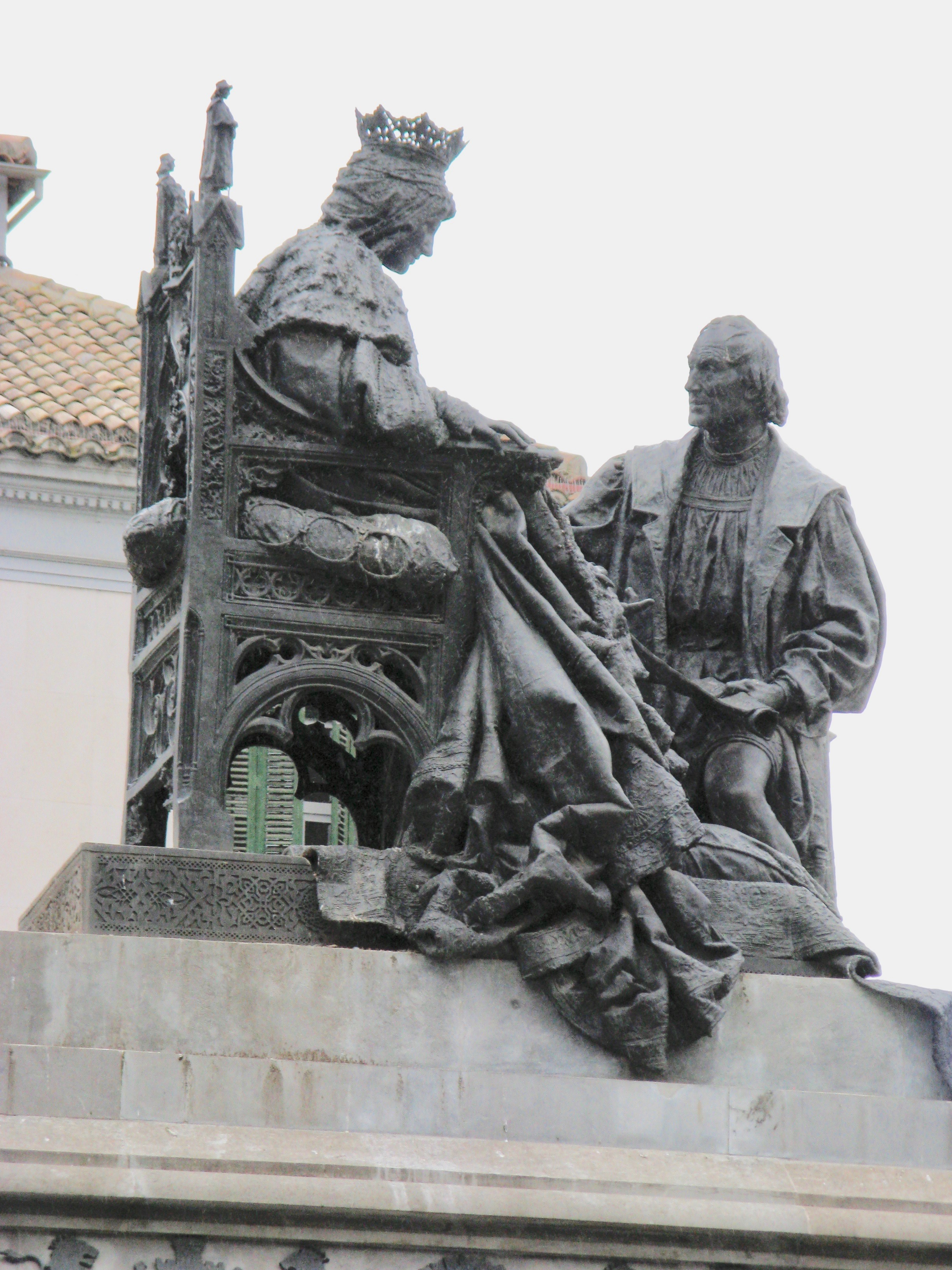
Monument to Queen Isabella and Columbus, 1892 (Granada)

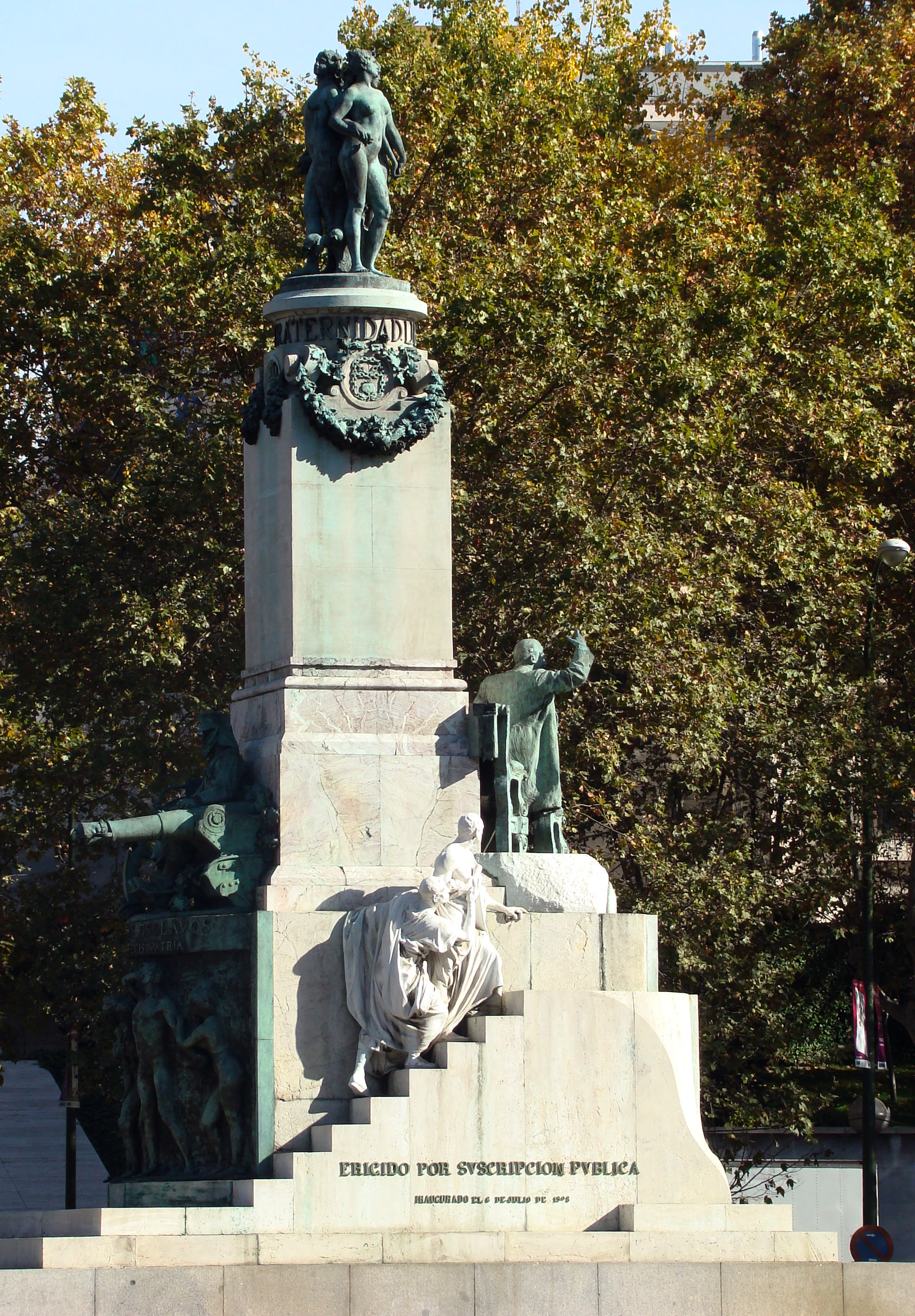
Monument to Emilio Castelar, 1908 (Madrid)

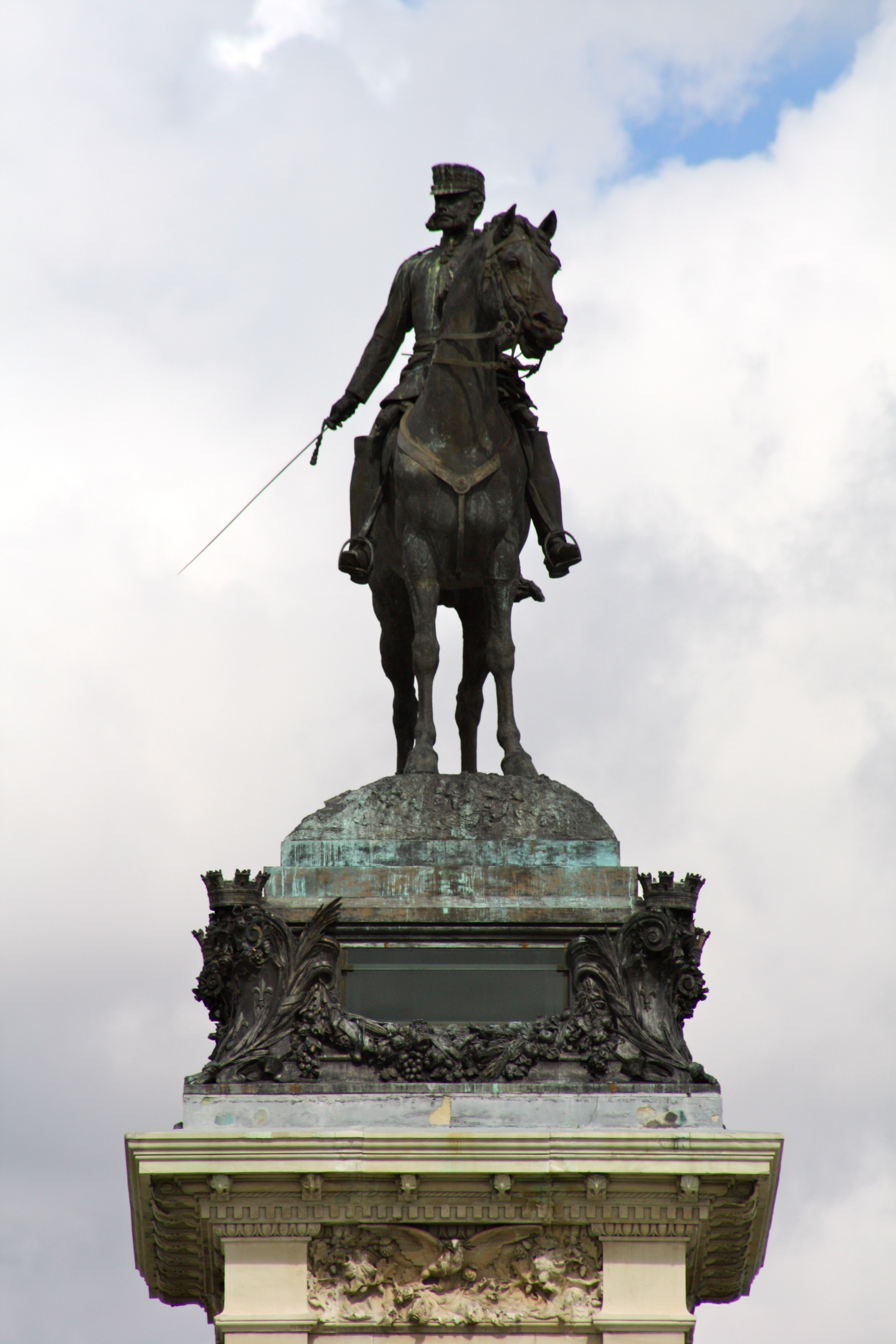
Equestrian statue of Alfonso XII, 1928 (Madrid)

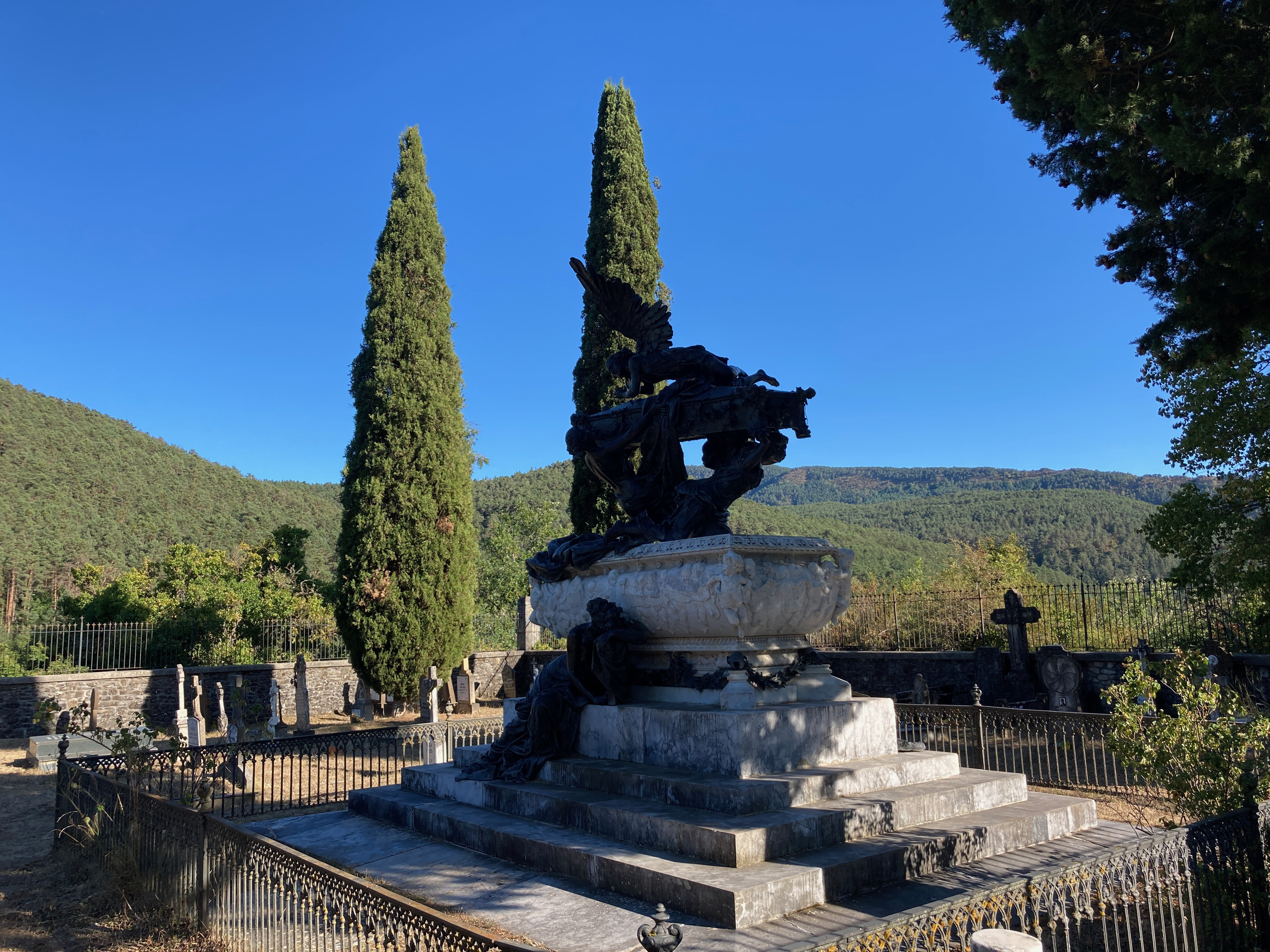
Mausoleum of Julián Gayarre
