= Lamela =

Lamela may refer to

- Lamela (surname)
- Lamela, Zenica, a residential building in Bosnia and Herzegovina
- Estudio Lamela, a Spanish firm of architecture
