= Lamela (surname) =

Lamela is a Hispanic surname that may refer to the following notable people:

- Antonio Lamela (1926–2017), Spanish architect
- Baldomero Lamela (1805–1867), Argentine soldier
- Carlos Lamela (born 1957), Spanish architect, son of Antonio
- Carmen Lamela (born 1961), Spanish judge
- Erik Lamela (born 1992), Argentine football player
- Joel Lamela (born 1971), Cuban sprinter
- Juan José Medina Lamela, Puerto Rico Adjutant General
- Yago Lamela (1977–2014), Spanish long jumper
- Zugey Lamela, Puerto Rican journalist and news presenter
- Atabey Lamela, Puerto Rican federal attorney

== See also ==
- Lamelas (surname)
