= Torres de Colón =

High-rise building in Madrid

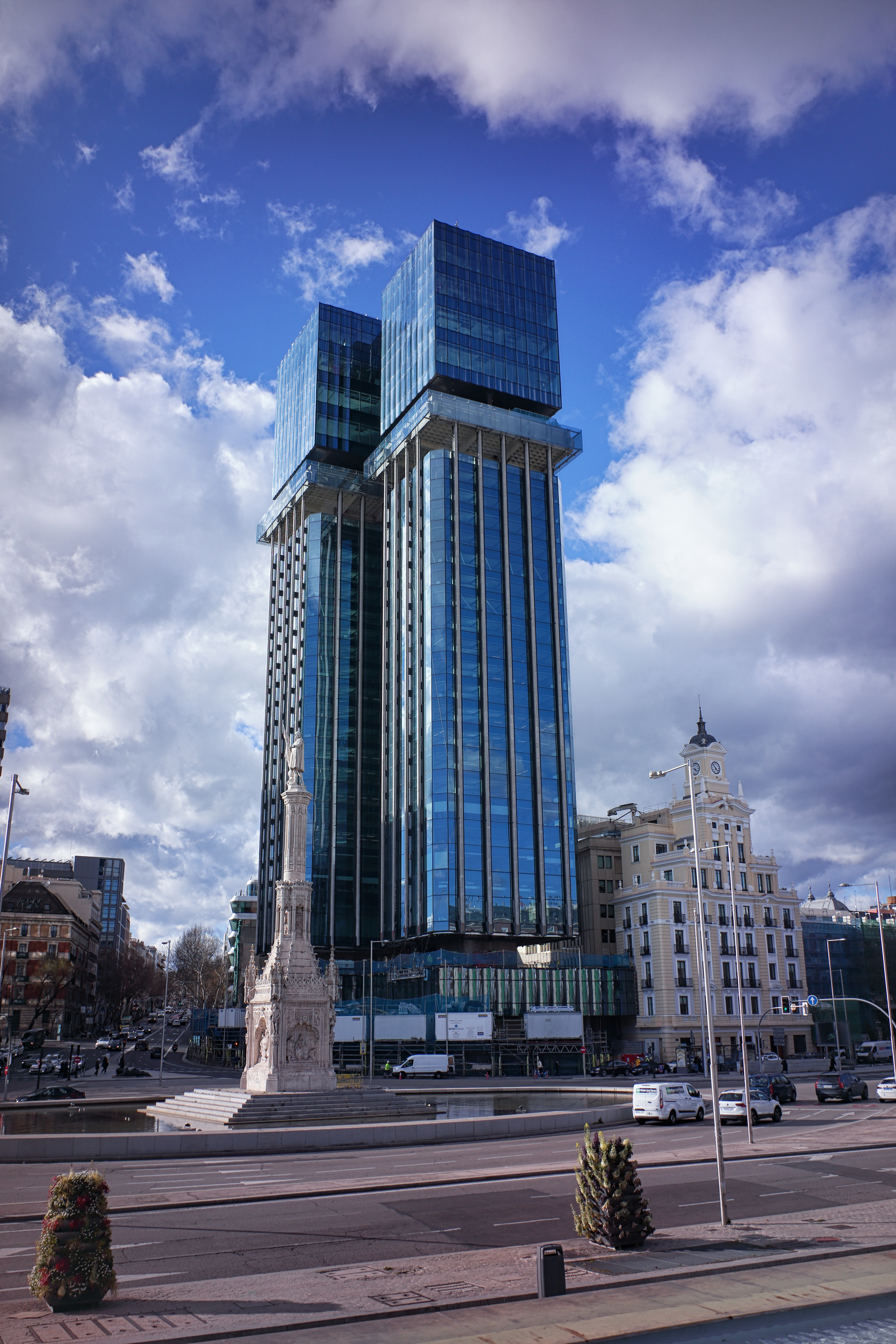
- Torres de Colón in February 2024 after renovation
- Interactive map of the Torres de Colón area

General information
- Status: Completed
- Type: Office
- Location: 31 Calle de Génova, Plaza de Colón, Madrid
- Coordinates: 40°25′33″N 3°41′28″W
- Construction started: 1968
- Completed: 1976
- Renovated: 1990–1992; 2009–2012; 2020–2024 (final)
- Owner: Mutua Madrileña

Height
- Roof: 110.6 m (363 ft) (1976–2020); 115.1 m (378 ft) (2024–present)

Technical details
- Floor count: 23 (1976–2020); 30 (2024–present)
- Floor area: 16,253 m^{2} (174,950 sq ft)
- Lifts/elevators: 8 (4 each)

Design and construction
- Architects: Antonio Lamela; Luis Vidal + Arquitectos (renvoations)
- Developer: Osinalde, SA
- Structural engineer: Carlos Fdez. Casado; Calter Ingeniería (renvoations)
- Main contractor: Huarte

The Torres de Colón (English: Columbus Towers) (Note: The original name was preferred by Antonio Lamela, since removing the preposition gave the name a more forceful sound.Esteban 2017, p. 8) is a high-rise office building complex in the Plaza de Colón district of Madrid, Spain. Originally built between 1968 and 1976, and renovated in 2024, the complex consists of two twin towers standing at 115.1 m (378 ft) tall with 30 floors each. They were designed by Spanish architect Antonio Lamela.

They were originally conceived as twin towers sharing the same base until the 1990 renovation, which connected the two structures with a suspended fire escape. (Note: The CTBUH definition of "joined building or complex" is applicable, since more than 50% of the building is joined or connected (in this case, by the fire escape), and is therefore considered a single building.) It is currently the 11th tallest building in the Spanish capital and was the tallest office building in Madrid until the completion of the Torre Picasso in 1989. The towers were built between 1967 and 1976 by the Madrid-based architect Antonio Lamela and the engineers Leonardo Fernández Troyano, Javier Manterola, and Carlos Fernández Casado.

In December 2019, the owner, Mutua Madrileña, announced a major renovation of the towers, which took place between 2020 and 2024. The base floors and the plug-shaped crown were removed and replaced with two new four-story structures, an intervention carried out by the Spanish architect Luis Vidal. Since April 2025, and for a period of 12 years, they have been leased in their entirety to the law firm Garrigues.

== History ==
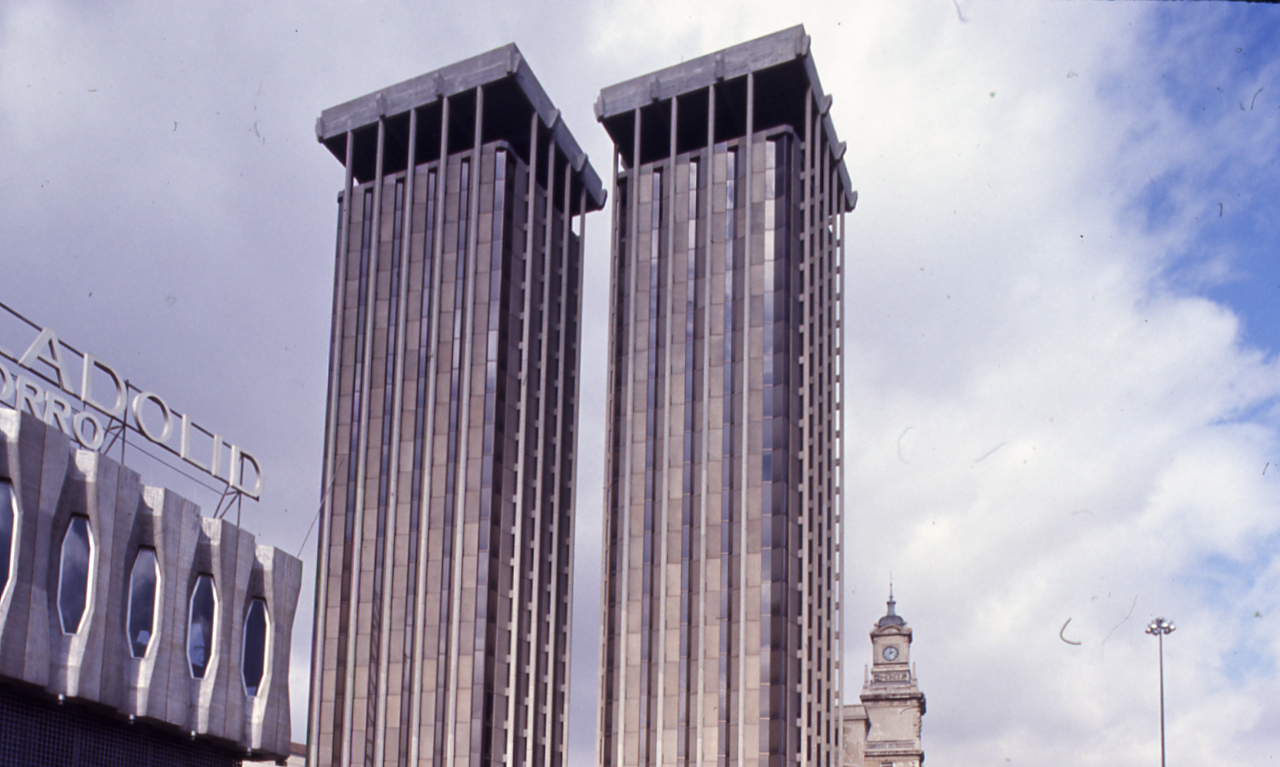
Torres de Colón in the early 1980s photographed by Paolo Monti.

The building with its 116-meter height and 23 floors is the twelfth-tallest in the Spanish capital (counting the CTBA towers). It was the headquarters of the Rumasa company, during which time its name was changed to Torres de Jerez (Towers of Jerez), in honour of the home town of the company. It is currently valued at $116 million.

It is found in and dominates the Plaza de Colón, one of the major commercial centres in Madrid. The twin buildings are known locally as "El Enchufe" or "The Plug" for the plug-like structure that binds them.

The towers are located at 31 Calle de Génova, on the corner of Paseo de la Castellana and overlooking Plaza de Colón, in the Almagro neighborhood of the Chamberí district. Calle de Goya and Paseo de Recoletos also converge at this plaza, and directly opposite are the Jardines del Descubrimiento (Discovery Gardens), inaugurated in 1977.

Across Calle de Génova is the Centro Colón, built at the same time as the towers. Its neighbors include the Crédit Agricole IndoSuez building and the Palacete de los Condes de Egaña (Mansion of the Counts of Egaña). The site was formerly occupied by the palatial home of Luis de Silva y Fernández de Córdoba, an apartment building whose façade followed the curve of the plaza. Also known as the "Twin Buildings," they were designed by Spanish architect Lorenzo Álvarez Capra and built in 1881. Benito Pérez Galdós lived there and wrote some of his most important works. In 1964, the Basque real estate developer José María Osinalde acquired the properties, which belonged to the Azpiroz family, at number two, Plaza de Colón.

The small plot of land on which they are located was part of what was known as the Huerta de Loinaz, the triangle formed by Almagro, Génova, and Paseo de la Castellana streets. Following the initiatives of the Castro Plan in the mid-19th century, there was considerable speculation, and it was in this context that the French company Parent, Schaken et Cie bought a large tract of land to later sell it in subdivided lots. Schaken was a company linked to the Schaken Parent railway company, which participated in the development of Madrid's railways from the second half of the 19th century. They urbanized the land in the southern part of the eastern Almagro neighborhood after it had passed through the hands of the Arango family, of Cuban origin, who were among the largest landowners in the neighborhood along with Miguel Sainz de Indo. The result was the construction of residences in this area for the wealthiest sectors of society.

== Location ==
=== Surroundings ===
In 1964, Antonio Lamela presented a project entitled "Planning of Plaza de Colón," advocating for open, high-rise buildings. In the journal Arquitectura, he reflected on the lack of an efficient and up-to-date General Urban Development Plan, which forced private developers to anticipate the plans—an undesirable situation that fostered land speculation and increased construction costs. He submitted two "volume planning projects" to the City Council for the plots located on either side of the intersection of Calle de Génova and Plaza de Colón, proposing high-rise, freestanding buildings. His idea was based on maximizing the use of ground-floor space by reducing the visual impact of the structure and facades that did not reach the ground, in what he called "suspended architecture," referring not only to its structure but also to the pedestrian's perception from ground level. In his project, he aimed to create a cohesive urban unit, balanced between the corner masses, expand pedestrian space both in sidewalks and in the permeability of the site by allowing pedestrian traffic on the ground floors of the buildings, obtain a good view from Jorge Juan and Goya streets, and solve the problem of lack of parking.

=== Urban planning ===
Within this urban planning context, the architectural project for the Columbus Towers was conceived, and construction began in 1968. In 1969, the Old Mint was demolished, and a public competition for ideas—unusual at the time—was launched to design the site as a landscaped public space. The competition requirements included the creation of a commemorative framework for the historical event of the Discovery of America and its representative figures, an underground public parking garage with a capacity for 1,000 vehicles, a landscaped area, and a solution to the traffic problems at the intersection. Lamela's project eliminated the section of Jorge Juan Street adjacent to the National Library building, removing the fences and iron railings, as he considered the concept of walled enclosures typical of early 20th-century buildings outdated; this created a superblock for public facilities. It also involved the creation of an overpass over Recoletos-Castellana, facilitated by the topography of Génova and Goya streets, which descend to Plaza de Colón. For the western part of the plaza, Lamela reused the volume arrangement project already submitted to the City Council in 1964. 580 technicians from different specialties entered the competition; Antonio Lamela received an Honorable Mention.

== Architecture ==
=== Initial design concept (1968) ===
Both towers had always been planned with a rectangular, not square, floor plan, with the Castellana tower facing parallel to the avenue and the Genoa tower facing south. The staircases were located at the rear, that is, to the north in the tower facing Genoa and to the west in the tower facing Castellana. The elevators were in the central core, in a group of three, one of them a double-cab elevator for use as a freight elevator.

The project was conceived for residential use from the outset. Numerous designs and layouts were considered, including three, two, and one apartment per floor, featuring large cantilevered terraces that were highly sought after at the time. Its use as tourist apartments managed by a hotel chain was even considered, an innovative concept that had proven successful in more tourist-oriented areas. Ultimately, the riskiest option was chosen: one apartment per floor with the finest possible finishes and luxuries. To facilitate marketing, a full-scale model was built in Las Pueblas, elevated one story above the ground, faithfully recreating the interior layout and materials used as a "show apartment." The residential use plan was short-lived, as the halt in construction prevented the proper marketing of the residential units. The show apartment was used for many years by a family close to the Osinalde family until it was demolished.

The towers have a suspended structure; the building consists of two pillars together on top of a platform from which hang two large towers with perimeter beams six feet singing with pendulums each floor with cable-stayed steel cables. Construction commenced with the concrete footings, the two central pillars and the upper platform. Then the towers were built from top to bottom, from the upper platform plant to plant closer to the base of the building. At the base, three floors (six floors including basements) were built from the bottom up.

=== First design (1976) ===
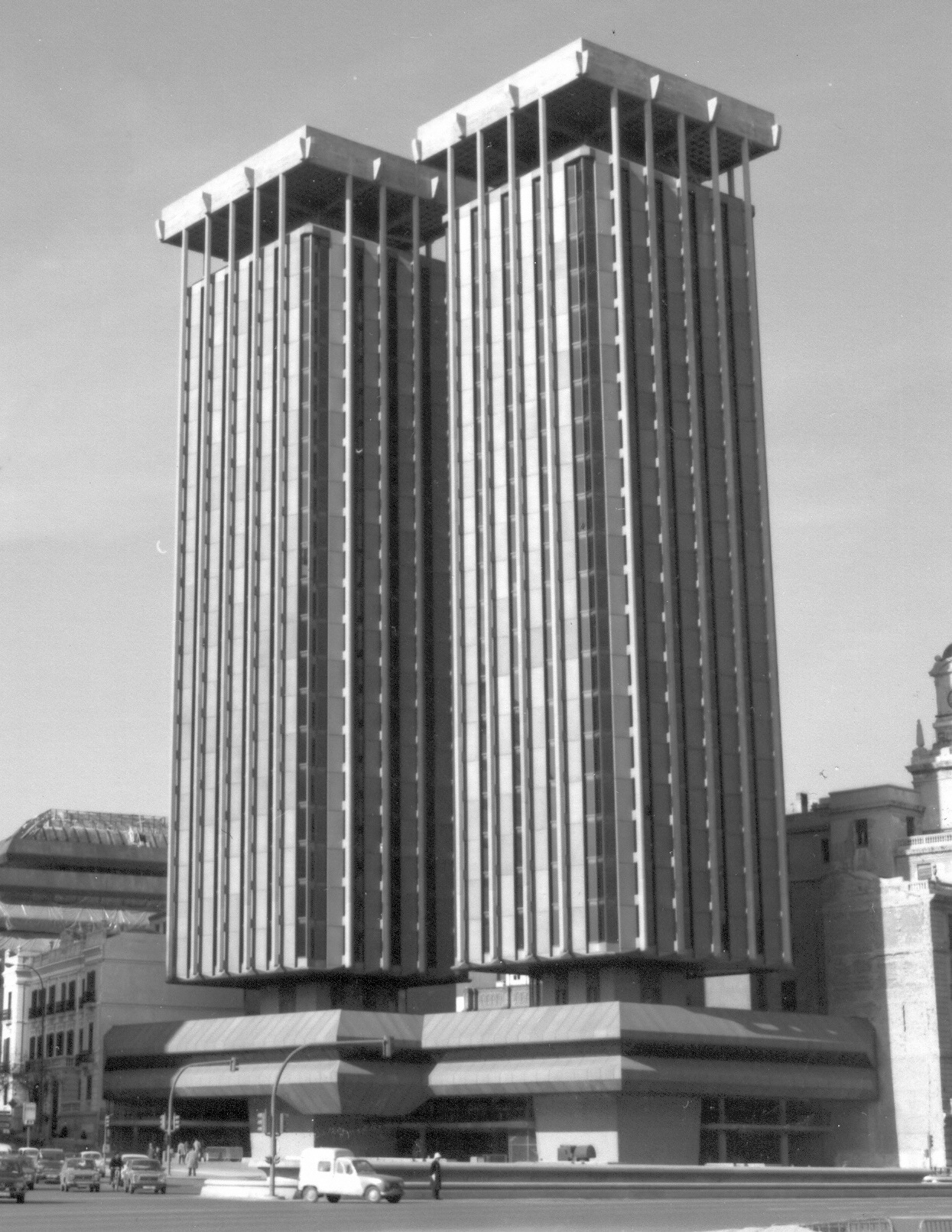
The towers in 1976, shortly after inauguration.

The building consists of a base or podium upon which rise two twin towers of orange-brown color, topped by two greenish crests joined by a plug-shaped finial from which the emergency staircases hang. The building has three elevators in each tower and two elevators on the parking levels.

The base is reminiscent of the nearby building at Génova 27, also designed by Estudio Lamela, before its renovation by the same firm between 2003 and 2005. The original 1974 project, during the height of the oil crisis, aimed for "natural climate control and self-protection," achieved through angled glass to minimize solar exposure. The two twenty-story towers rise from the podium, one projecting forward of the other rather than parallel. The typical floor plan of the tower is quadrangular, but not perfectly square. With a floor area of 607.74 m², it consists of a reinforced concrete central core containing four openings: three for elevators and a fourth for wiring and other installations. The façade features double- glazed glass: the first pane has a sawtooth pattern, while the second, installed during the 1990s renovation, is uniform with rounded corners. Each tower is topped by a greenish, quadrangular crest joined by a semicircular, plug-shaped structure.

=== Suspended structure ===
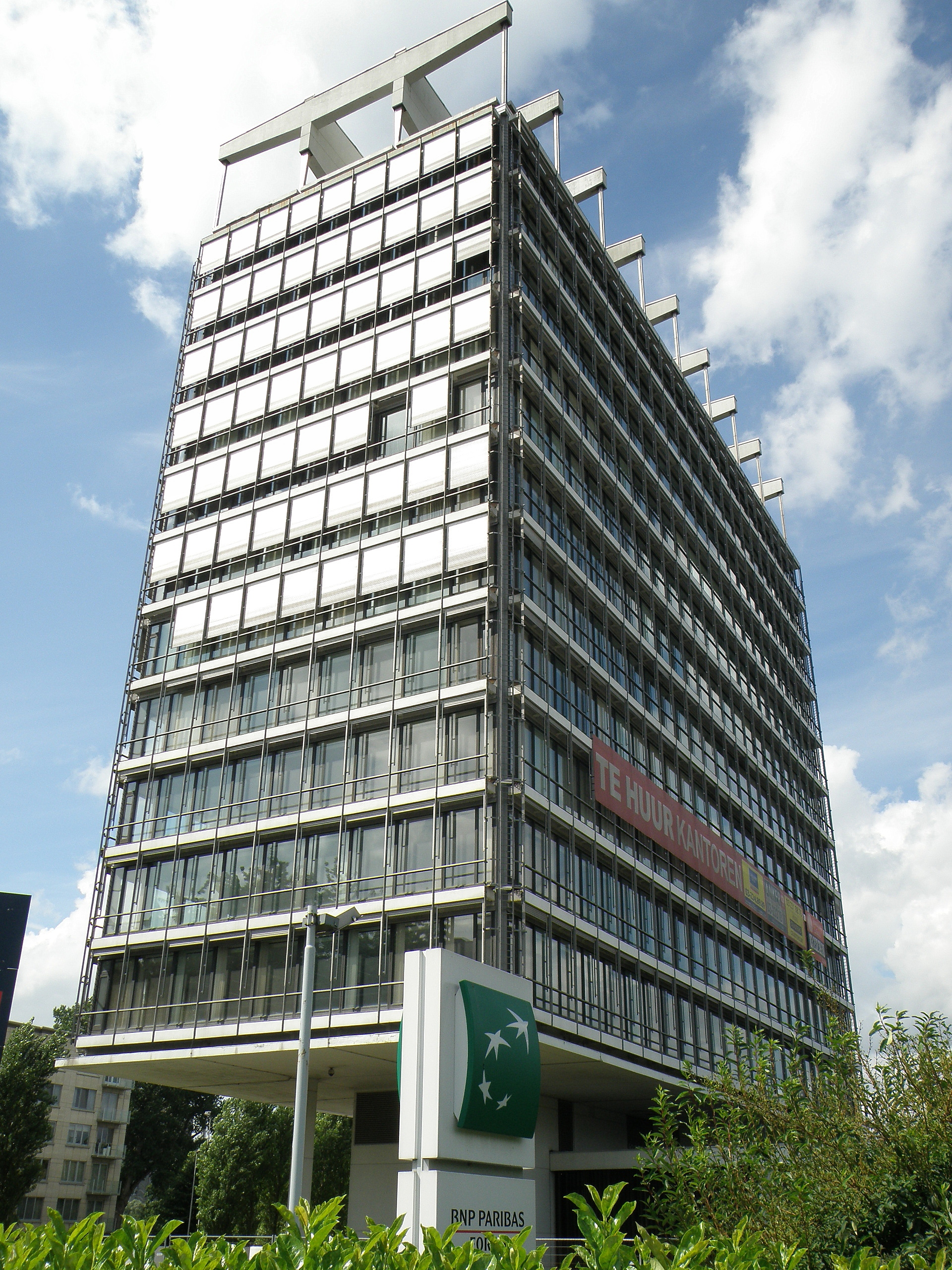
BP Building (Antwerp) which served as a reference for the towers' suspended structure.

What makes this building stand out is its technical innovation, since for various reasons the floors had to be built in reverse, that is, "from top to bottom." Choosing a traditional structure would have made vehicle access to the basement levels impossible, as the necessary pillars would not have left enough space for ramps, and would have reduced the usable space for parking. This space was crucial due to the already small size of the plot (1700 m²). Furthermore, the new municipal ordinance required a minimum of 150 parking spaces. This approach resulted in completely open-plan floors, free of pillars and beams, allowing for maximum flexibility in the layout and better use of the usable area without obstructing the horizontal utilities. Furthermore, thanks to the transmission of loads through the core, one of the towers could be projected up to 9.5 meters above Genoa Street, as there were no supports obstructing pedestrian traffic. However, the choice of this method resulted in an increase in construction costs of between 10 and 15% compared to the traditional pillar structure.

This suspended or hanging structure model was novel because until then only seventeen towers in the world had been built using this system, such as the Commercial Union Building (now St. Helen's or Aviva Tower) or 20 Fenchurch Street (demolished) in London, the BP Building in Antwerp, the Standard Bank Centre in Johannesburg, or the BMW Headquarters, among others. Subsequently, Spanish architecture adopted the hanging model, developing in other cases the experience originating in the Columbus Towers.

The towers are designed in a way that departs from the traditional skyscraper or tower scheme, their main peculiarity being that the building's loads are transferred to a cap structure located at the top of the building and from there are conveyed, through a central concrete core, to the foundations. The loads are transmitted to the central core directly or through the cap structure, ultimately being transferred to the ground by means of a 13x13 m footing, 7 meters deep.

Through the suspended structure, the horizontal supports extend towards a structural system located at the top of each tower. This system consists of four beams, crisscrossed in pairs, with depths decreasing from 5 to 3 meters, forming a tic-tac-toe grid. These beams, also called radial beams, were constructed on formwork. The lower half was built first, then the upper half, and finally the 3-meter-deep perimeter tie beams, visually forming an irregular 3x3 grid. All of these were made of post-tensioned reinforced concrete. Sufficient space was left in the center of this inverted aerial foundation structure to house the machine rooms for the elevators and other building services.

From the perimeter beams hang a total of 18 post-tensioned concrete tie rods or pendulums, arranged at regular intervals on the façade, which allow for the attachment of the prefabricated anodized aluminum exterior cladding that, in turn, houses the air conditioning ducts. The 21 floor slabs of the towers rest on this system via their outer edges. These slabs are made of lightweight reinforced concrete and are supported on the central core by means of gusset plates embedded within it.

== Construction ==
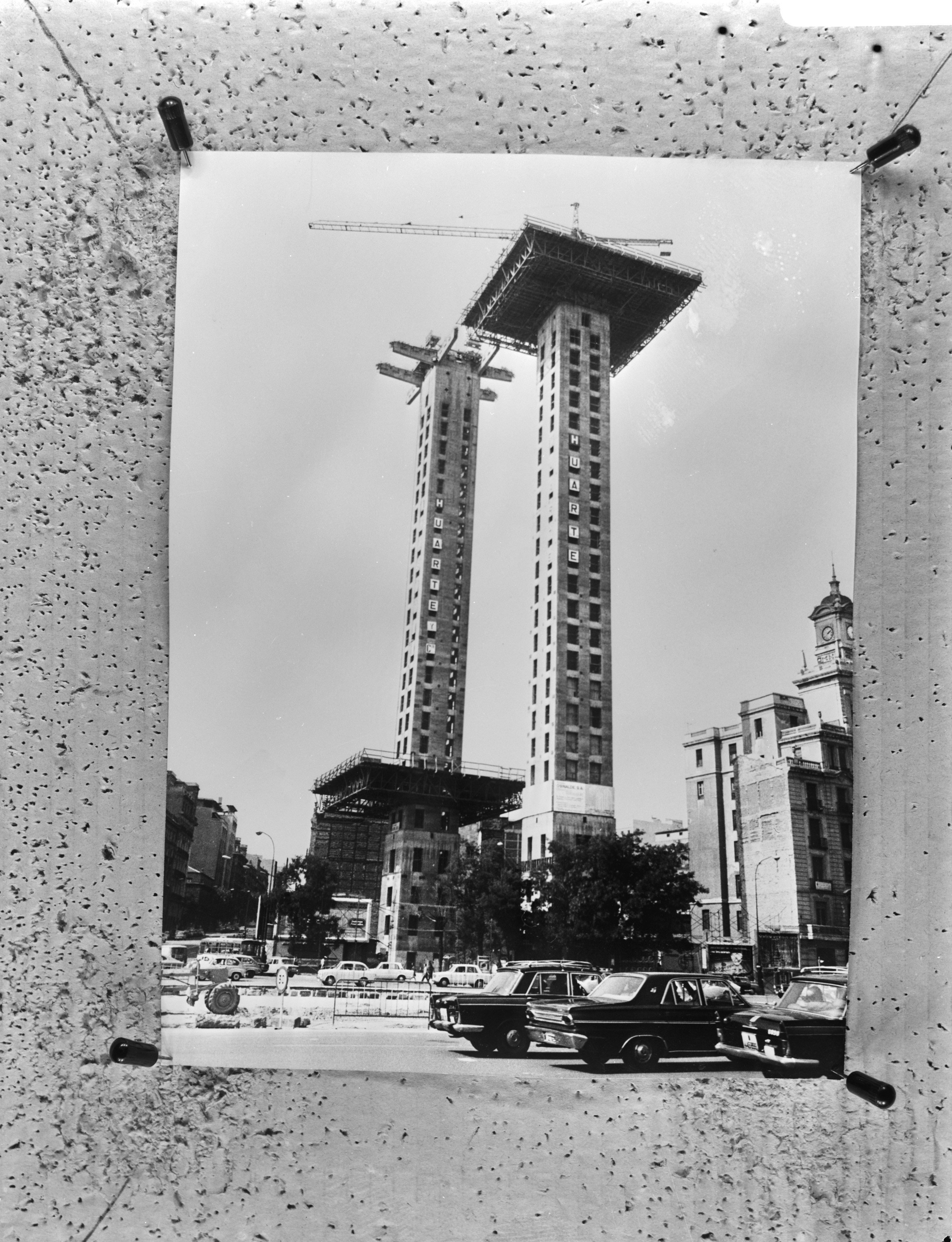
The towers under construction in 1972.

Animation of the construction process of the towers.

The two central cores and the basements were constructed simultaneously, as the latter helped to stabilize the cores by preventing lateral movement. The central cores were then erected to a height of 110 meters, measured from the foundation level, using slipforms. The perimeter and radial beams were constructed in two phases using a temporary support platform or falsework. By constructing the lower phase first, the upper half could be placed on top of it, since the falsework did not have sufficient strength to support the total weight.

Once this was done, the perimeter braces or pendulums of the head structure were anchored, and the auxiliary platform was lowered every two floors. The odd-numbered floor slabs were then built on this platform, and once they had cured, the even-numbered floor slabs were constructed in the traditional way using props supported by the existing slabs. This system allowed for faster construction and the correction of any deviations in elevation, thus offsetting the additional cost that this style of construction entails compared to traditional methods.

The towers were constructed using a suspended or hanging structure: the building consists of two large pillars joined at the top by a platform from which a total of 18 pendulums, held in place by steel cables, hang from large, six-meter high perimeter beams, supporting each floor. For its construction, the concrete foundations were first built, upon which the two "super pillars" or central core and the upper platform were erected. Subsequently, the towers were built from the top down, proving the saying "to start building the house from the roof." At their base, a three-story plinth was added, in addition to six basement levels for parking.

=== Structural issues ===
The building was originally intended for luxury apartments of 400 square meters. In August 1970, it was claimed that the Madrid City Council had ordered the "demolition of the excessive construction", and that the building had exceeded the permitted height by two floors and should be reduced by nine meters. In any case, the developer won the lawsuit, and the compensation that the council owed him was so high that it instead allowed him to change the use from residential to commercial, that is, to house offices, which was much more profitable at the time. Construction remained halted until 1973.

According to a news item in La Vanguardia from July 1974, the works would be completed the following spring (1975) and more than 100 million pesetas had been invested in the construction to date - the only data we have on the cost of the works. At the foot of the towers we find an urban sculpture called Heron, by José Luis Sánchez Fernández from 1975.

=== Opening ===
The towers were inaugurated in 1976. On November 15, 1977, the towers were advertised in the newspaper La Vanguardia as "high-end luxury in the heart of Madrid," whose commercial office space offered the following amenities: telex, internal telephone, piped music, carpeting, hot and cold air conditioning, and parking for 200 vehicles.

== Renovations chronology ==
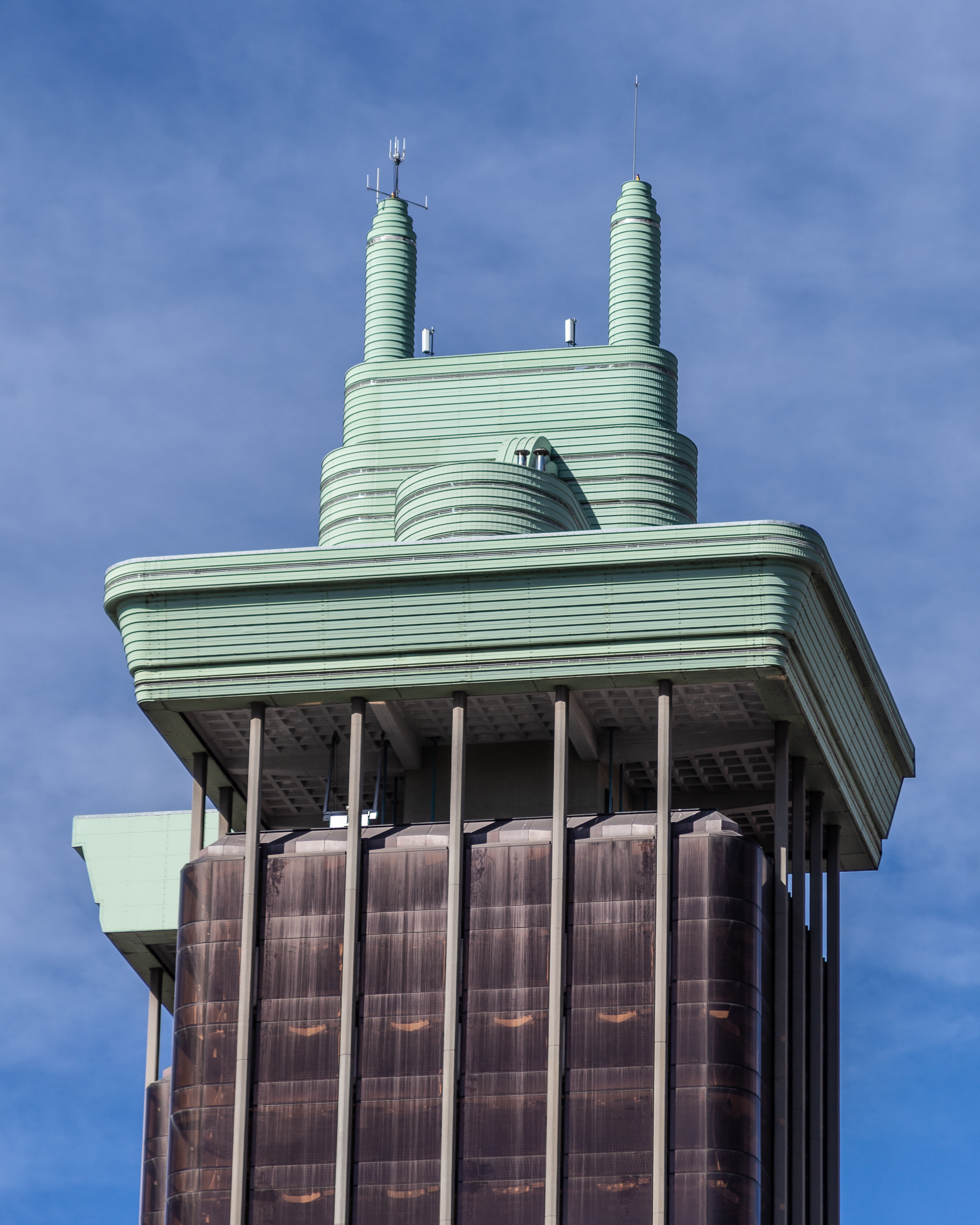
The plugs at the top half of the towers.

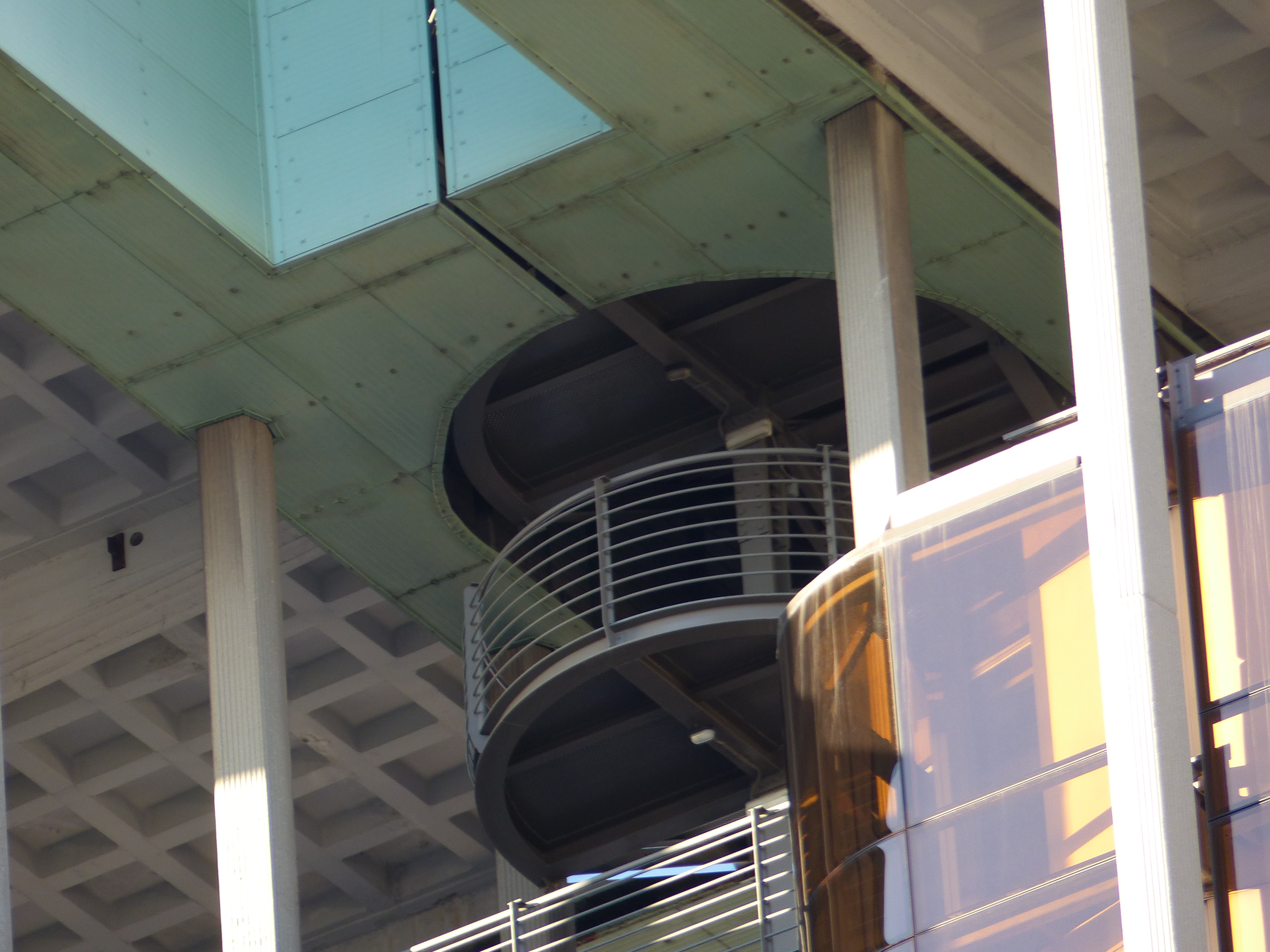
Junction of the buildings and upper part of the fire escape.

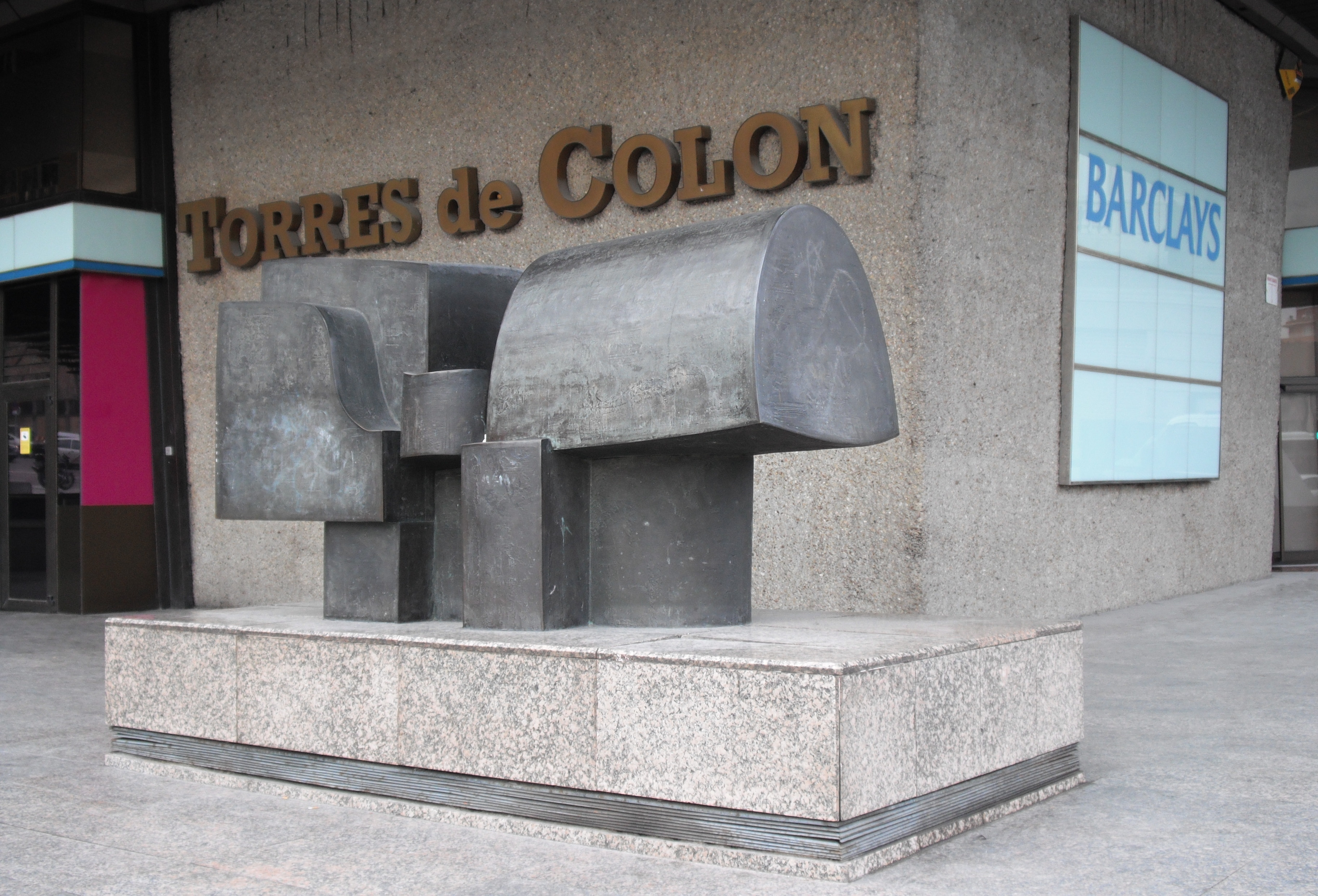
The Heron sculpture created by José Luis Sánchez Fernández in 1975.

=== 1990s ===
The first renovation, carried out between 1990 and 1993, significantly altered the building's original appearance, transforming it from two twin towers joined by a base into a single building. In the original 1967 design, Lamela failed to consider a suitable solution for building evacuation. His proposal was a fabric chute down which fire victims would slide directly to the street, like a slide. It didn't occur to anyone that this posed a significant risk to anyone using it, for example, from the twentieth floor. In 1989, Estudio Lamela was commissioned to find a solution. Due to new regulations, an emergency staircase was required, as the building lacked one. Since there was no space to install it, the solution was to run a beam between the two towers and suspend the staircase in the center, outdoors. This effectively made the towers appear as a single structure. Between the two roofs, a central finial was installed, which from then on was common to both towers. This finial, known as the controversial Art Deco "plug ," was designed to conceal the antennas and other machinery that had been added to the building. Two long-range spotlights were planned for the plug's prongs, but these were ultimately not installed due to their high cost. Neon light strips that changed color along the length of the enclosure were also installed, but these are now obsolete. Furthermore, taking advantage of the construction work, the towers were clad with a uniform bronze-tinted glass curtain wall to improve their thermal and acoustic insulation. The renovation cost 800 million pesetas. Following this renovation, the building's height increased from 86 meters above ground level to 110 meters due to the installation of the central finial. Several antennas are mounted above the finials of this finial, raising the maximum height to 116 meters. The result significantly altered the building's profile, making it taller and easily recognizable from a distance. Controversy about its aesthetic value still persists among Madrid residents.

=== 2000s-2010s ===
In 2009, the building owner commissioned Schindler Spain to renovate its elevators, as the old ones had reached the end of their useful life. They were replaced with double-cabin elevators, capable of serving two floors simultaneously and with greater capacity, and equipped with the latest safety, energy efficiency, and technological systems.

During 2012, the interior of the towers was remodeled without evicting its tenants. The project, undertaken by Estudio Lamela, consisted of adding escalators to access the lobby (located below street level) and a large glass box that houses a panoramic elevator and an emergency staircase. The project had a budget of €300,000. After a year of work, the entrances, lobby, common areas, floors, and garages were renovated, as well as the entire electrical system of the building. Colón model doors, specially made for the office lobby, were also installed.

In January 2017, Mutua Madrileña announced its intention to undertake a comprehensive renovation, which could involve, among other things, joining the two towers and cladding them. In 2016, the Madrid City Council authorized the use of the towers for residential and hotel purposes. After the death of architect Antonio Lamela, his project was revealed, which restores the building's original design: increasing the space between floors, thus reducing the current number of floors from 20 to 13, and building another seven above the roof, removing the antennas from the power outlet and utilizing the current 116 meters. This is just one of several projects that the new owner has under consideration for its renovation, so it is not certain that it will be carried out.

=== Final renovations (2020–2024) ===
In December 2019, Mutua Madrileña presented a new renovation project, which began in 2020 and was completed in 2024. This renovation replaced the Art Deco plug-shaped finial with a four-story structure rising above the two towers. The project, designed by architect Luis Vidal, did not affect the building's total height of 116 meters, but increased its floor area by adding the new structure and integrating the two towers, which were previously joined only by a fire escape. The floors at the base were also removed. The renovation cost 65 million euros.

Carlos Lamela, son of the architect of the towers and president of the Association for the Protection of the Colón Towers, filed an administrative appeal against the Madrid City Council for allowing the original project to be distorted. The City Council had considered protecting the building two years before the proposal for its comprehensive renovation, without implementing any protection measures or doing so in a timely manner.

The renovation carried out by the insurance company Mutua Madrileña, inaugurated in 2024, modified all the landmarks of these towers considered iconic, such as the warmth of the glass of their facade, their Art Deco crown, and their characteristic silhouette against the Madrid skyline.

The influential architect Rem Koolhaas paid no attention to any contemporary buildings in central Madrid except for the original appearance of the Columbus Towers, which have been altered beyond recognition.

== Usage ==
They were inaugurated as the "Torres de Jerez," since their first owner was the Rumasa conglomerate and their original location is Jerez de la Frontera. After the expropriation of Rumasa in 1983, the government decided to sell them at public auction to recover part of the financial shortfall it had created. The British group Heron International won the bid in 1986, paying 4.35 billion pesetas, beating out Juan Miguel Villar Mir, among others. In 1995, Mutua Madrileña acquired the building for 8.845 billion pesetas.

These towers have housed numerous companies and representative firms, such as the law firm Álvarez & Marsal, MCH Private Equity, Natixis, Legg Mason, M&G, BDO, the Norwegian Trade Office in Spain, the Japan External Trade Organization, Hays, Bip & Drive, Tokio Marine and Garrigues, among others.

== Reception ==
The Columbus Towers, from their very construction, aroused mixed opinions and were not without controversy. The working classes and even some architects doubted that the towers would be able to remain standing, being built from the top down, even calling the architect mad. Since then, criticism of the towers has followed a love-hate dynamic. When construction was halted, there were "those who asked for the towers to be spared and those who demanded they be decapitated".

A few years later, in 1978, in an editorial in El País, Francisco Umbral spoke of "Columbus Towers transubstantiated into tacky, fake, and bank-like Giraldas or Giraldillas" and called them "ugly and unanimous."

Carlos Lamela, also an architect and son of Antonio Lamela, highlights the Columbus Towers as his favorite "for their strategic importance in the city and for their technical innovation," although he then adds, referring to the 1990s renovation, "I think it wasn't very successful; it's a self-criticism that needs to be made".

In 2012, it was voted one of the ugliest buildings in Spain by readers of the real estate portal Idealista.com. It also appeared on a 2014 list of the most hideous buildings in Madrid.

In April 2018, it was announced that the Madrid City Council, at the request of the Regional Council for Historical Heritage, is studying its heritage protection through inclusion in the catalogue of protected buildings.

== Renovation site chronology ==
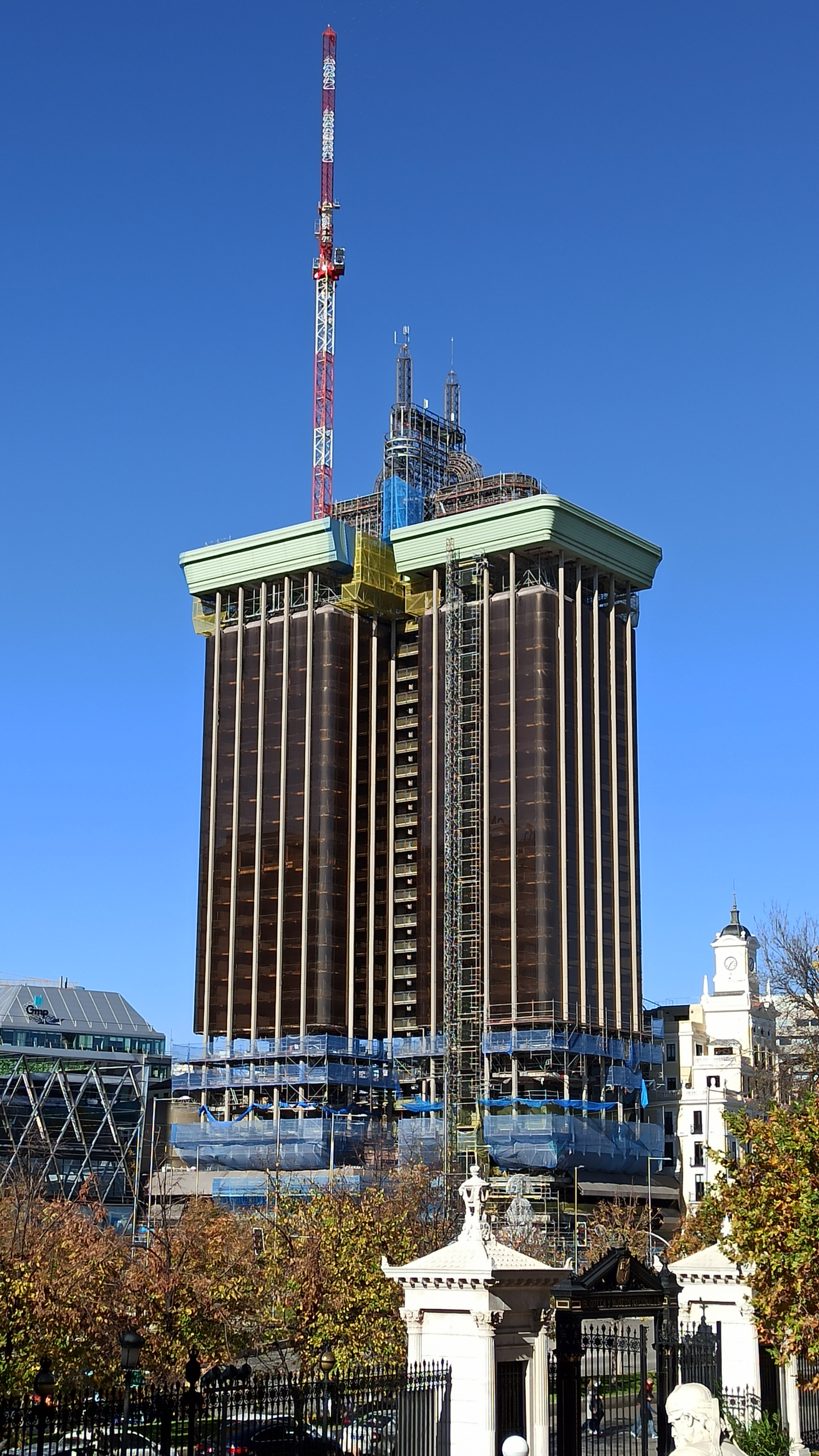
November 2020

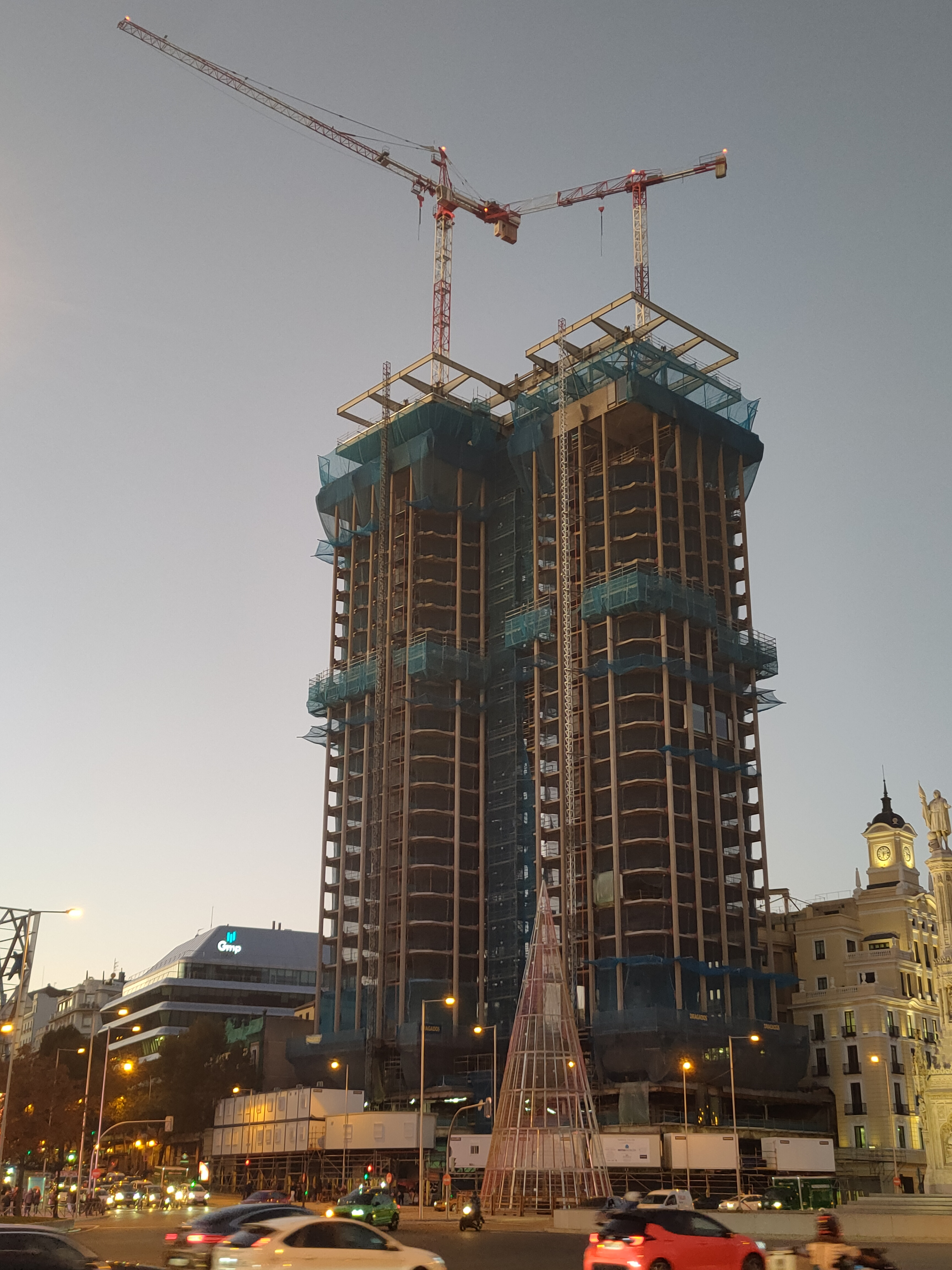
November 2021

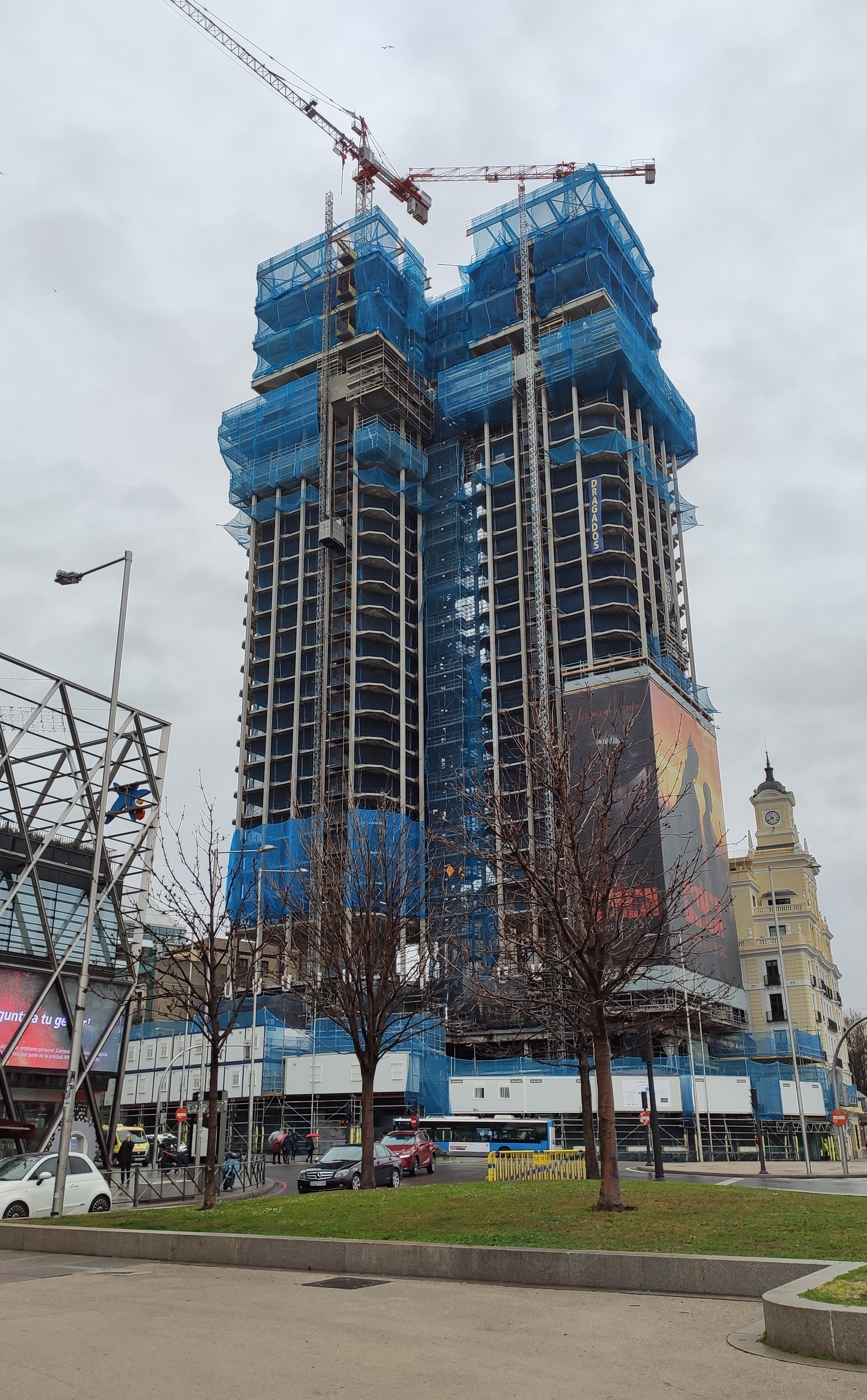
February 2022

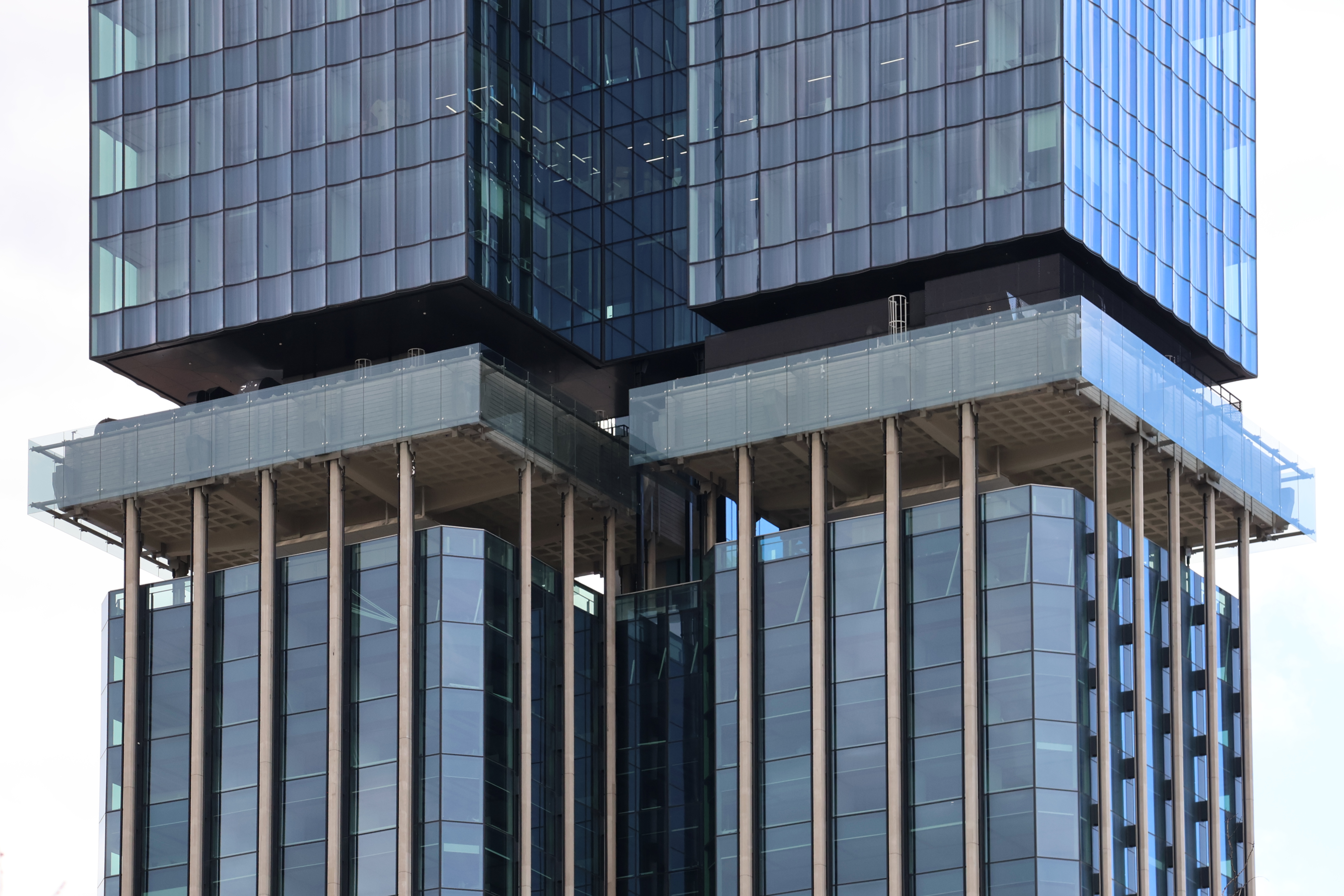
April 2025 (facade details)

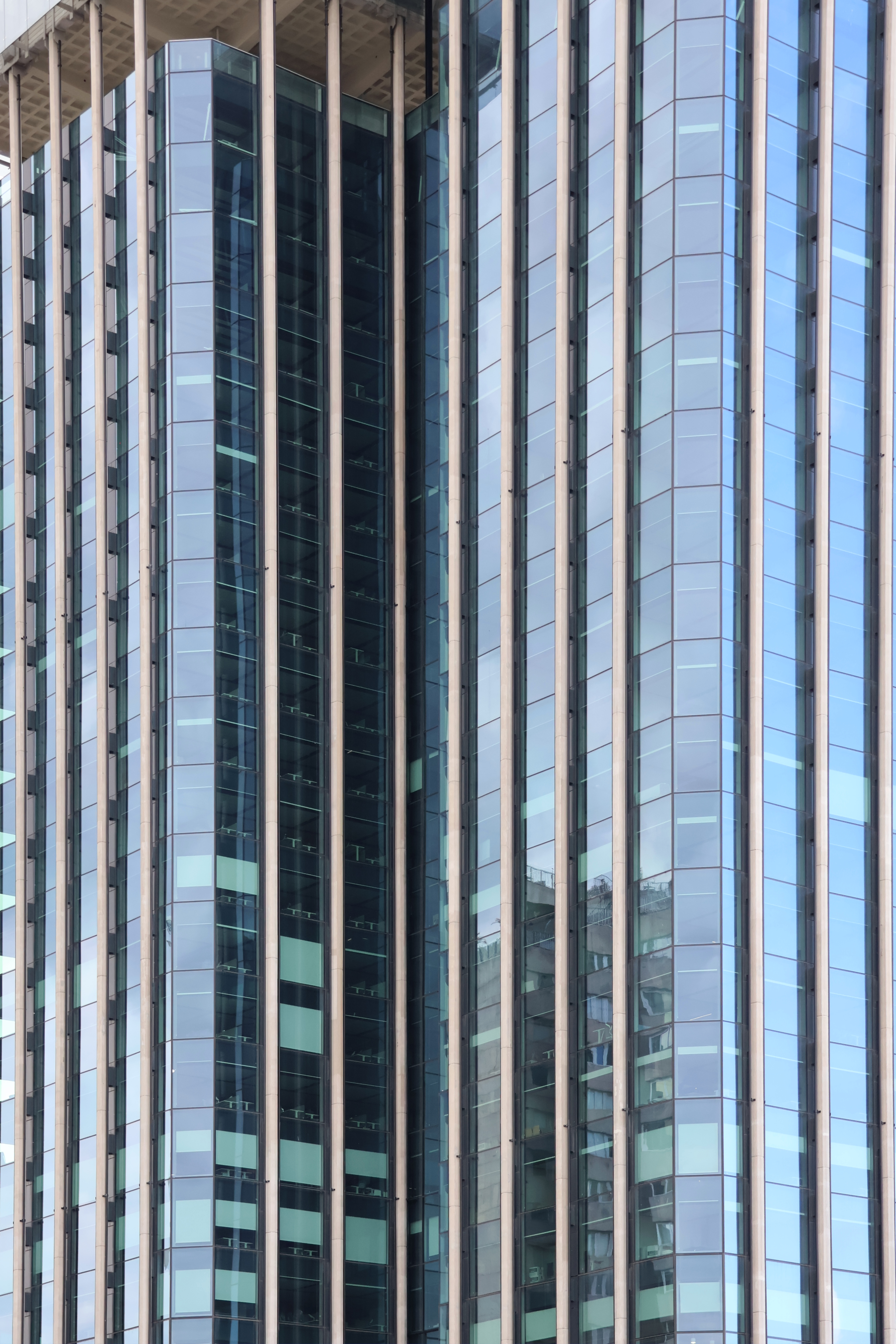
Glass facade details

== See also ==
- List of tallest buildings in Spain
- List of tallest buildings in Madrid

== Bibliography ==
- Esteban Concha (2017). Antonio Lamela y Torres Colón General de Ediciones de Arquitectura. Valencia. ISBN 978-84-946397-9-1.
- Leonardo Fernández Troyano, Javier Manterola, Carlos Fernández Casado (1977). Estructura de las Torres Colón, Madrid * España. Vol. 30. Informes de la construcción. pp. 61–94. ISSN 0020-0883.
- Ramón Guerra de la Vega (1981). Madrid (1920-1980) Guía de Arquitectura Contemporánea. Madrid: Propia del autor. ISBN 84-300-5362-X.
- Antonio Lamela (1977). Torres Colón, Madrid * España. Vol. 30. Informes de la construcción. pp. 29–60. ISSN 0020-0883.
