= Lamelas (surname) =

Lamelas is a Hispanic surname that may refer to the following notable people:

- David Lamelas (born 1946), Argentine artist
- Diego Lamelas (born 1972), Uruguayan rugby union player
- Diogo Lamelas (born 1990), Portuguese football forward
- Lazaro Lamelas Ramirez (born 1974), Cuban artistic gymnast
- Peter Lamelas, American diplomat

== See also ==
- Lamela (surname)
