= Estudio Lamela =

Spanish architecture firm

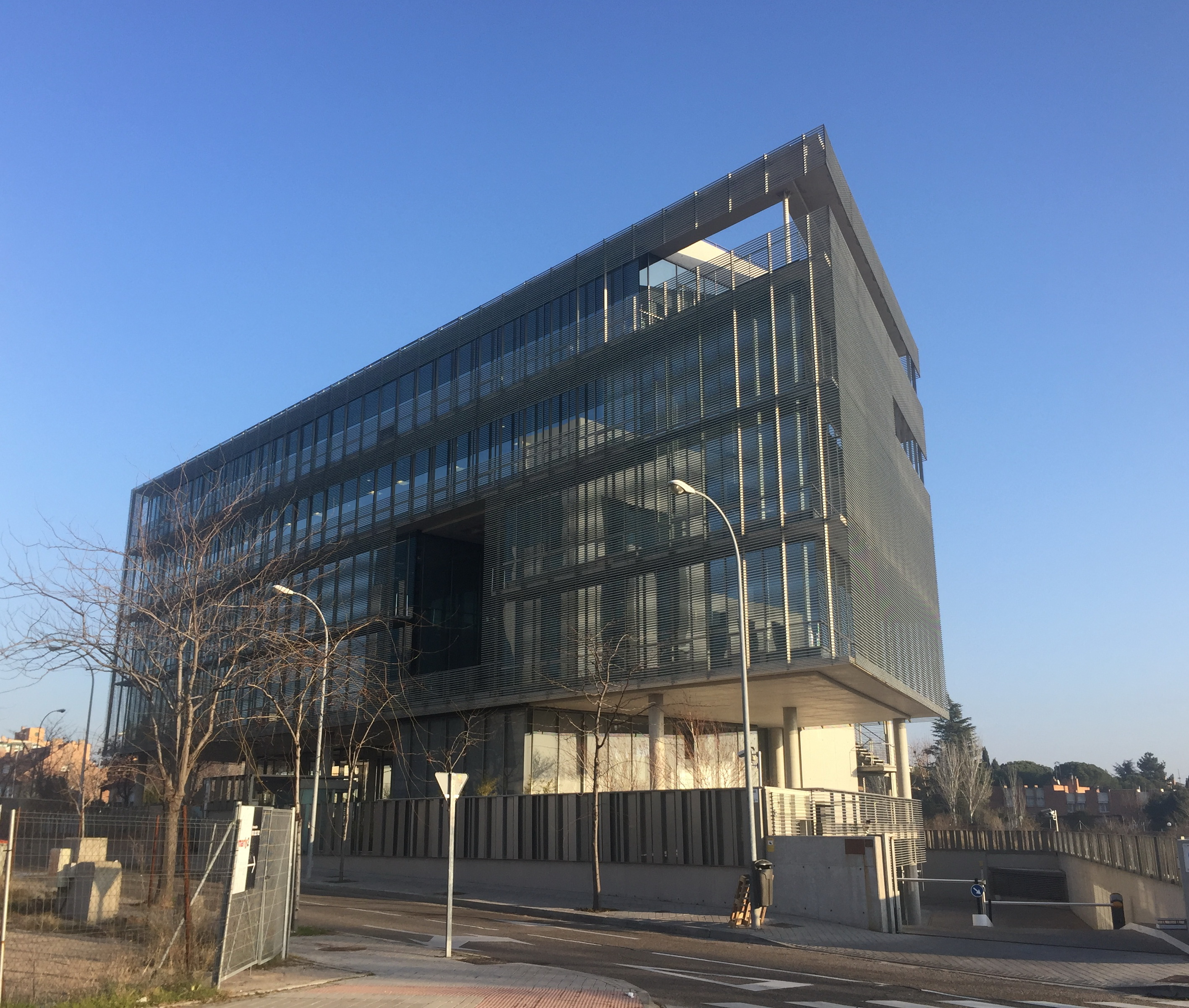
- Estudio Lamela headquarters in Madrid

Practice information
- Key architects: Founder:Antonio Lamela; Chairman:Carlos Lamela
- Founded: 1954

Significant works and honors
- Buildings: Adolfo Suárez Madrid–Barajas Airport; Santiago Bernabéu Stadium
- Awards: 2004 Stirling Prize with Richard Rogers Partnership

Website
- www.lamela.com

Estudio Lamela is a Spanish firm of architecture and urbanism based in Madrid, Spain.

== History ==
Estudio Lamela was created in 1954 when Antonio Lamela (Madrid, 1926) obtained his architecture degree. The firm is presently headed by his son Carlos Lamela (Madrid, 1957), who has been a qualified architect since 1981. From its beginnings, Estudio Lamela has grown to become one of the main architecture firms of Spain, with a very prolific output in the fields of residential and tourist architecture.

The firm's architectural approach is to provide technically innovative services from a modern and rational perspective. It has developed large national and international projects in all architectural areas, especially residential, tertiary, sports and airport.

In recent decades, the firm has undertaken projects in more than 30 countries and has opened branch offices in Warsaw (2002), Mexico City (2006) and Doha (2013). It is a founding member of the Architects Network (EAN), an organization that unites architectural firms in Europe.

== Highlighted works ==
=== Spain ===
- Residential and tourist buildings in Madrid (O'Donnell 33, 1958; Conjunto Castellana, 1960; Conjunto Galaxia, 1966) as well as numerous buildings on the island of Majorca and in Málaga (Costa del Sol). Examples: La Caleta, Torremar, Playamar, La Nogalera, Parquemar, etc.
- First modern hotels: Motel El Hidalgo (1960); Meliá Torremolinos (1962) and Meliá Madrid (1967).
- Office buildings: In Madrid, the O'Donnell Building 34 and Torres Colón (1967-1977) stand out. This latter structure is considered one of the most important buildings of Spanish architecture for its novel suspended construction. It maintains the world record for the number of floors suspended in a reinforced concrete structure. In addition, other emblematic works are the Pyramid Building (1978) and the International Bank of Commerce (1979), which has now been remodeled for the company GMP. Alongside these buildings are also the Cristalia Buildings, the Ebrosa Building, the John Deere headquarters, the Leitner Building, the IMDEA Software Institute and Caja Badajoz.
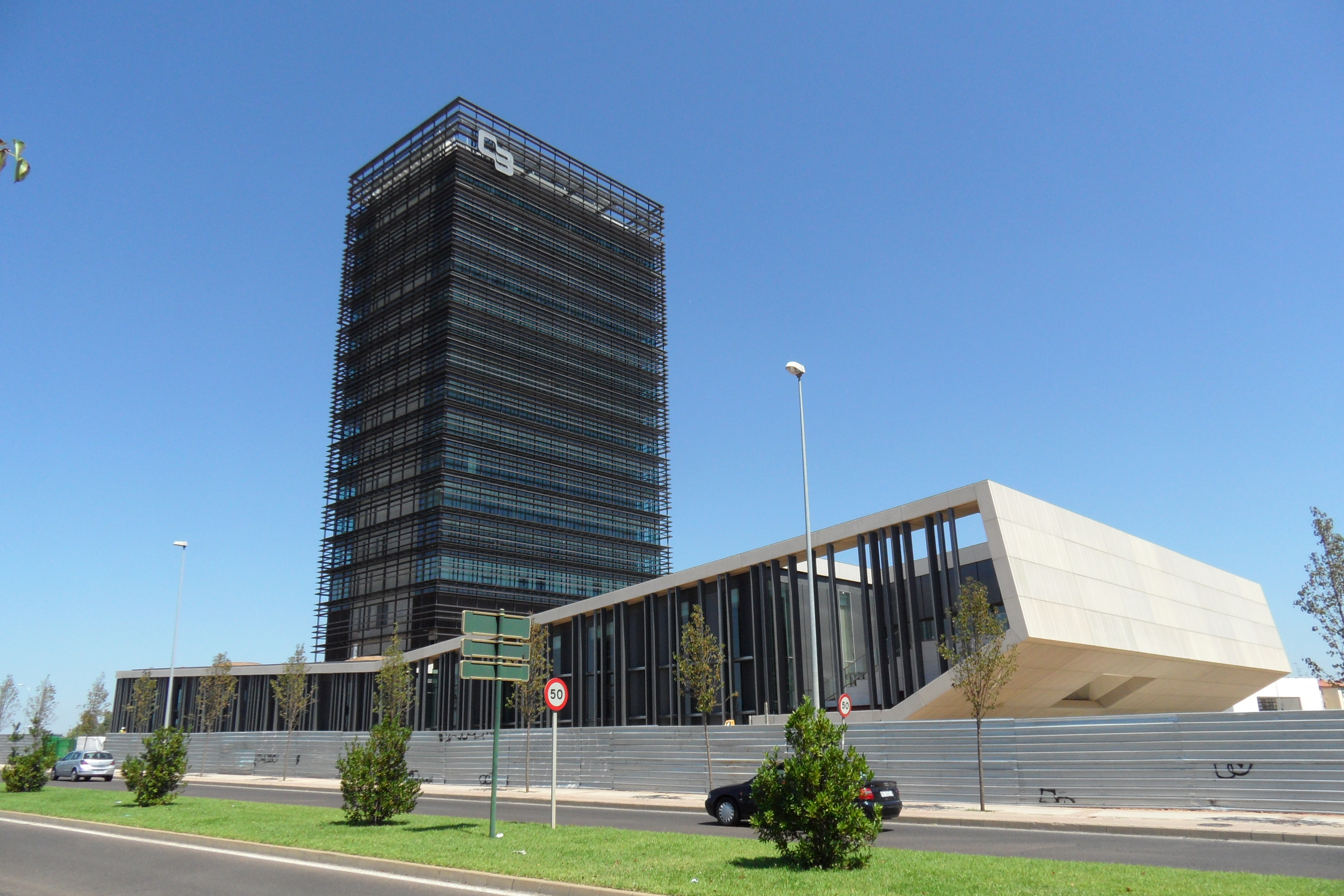
  Estudio Lamela. Headquarters of Caja Badajoz
- Remodeling of the Santiago Bernabéu Stadium (1988-1994). The firm proposed a facade and a third upper ring designed to seat 20,000 spectators. The challenge was to make this adaptation while the Stadium continued to be used regularly.
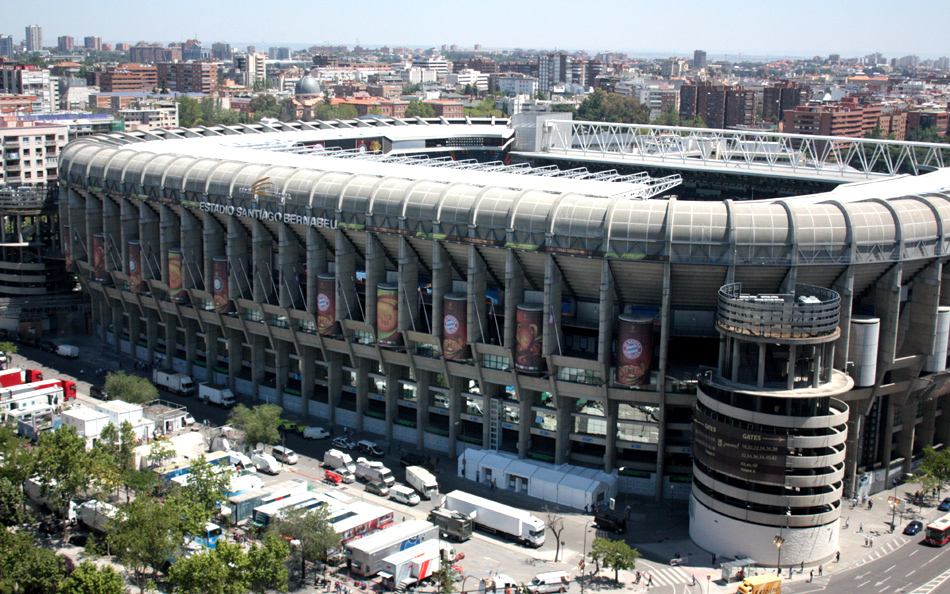
  Estudio Lamela. Remodeling of the Santiago Bernabéu Stadium
- New Stadium of Son Moix (1994-1996) in Mallorca with capacity for 26,000 spectators.
- Exhibition centres of Galicia (1991-1994).
- New T4 and T4S Terminals of the Madrid-Barajas Airport (1997-2006). Both structures are prepared to serve more than 35 million passengers. At the time, with 1.2 million square metres, it was the largest building in the world. Developed in collaboration with the British architecture firm Rogers Stirk Harbor + Partners (RSH + P), it is a globally recognized work that has received several prizes: Stirling, Architectural Record (work of the year) and best airport terminal of the world.
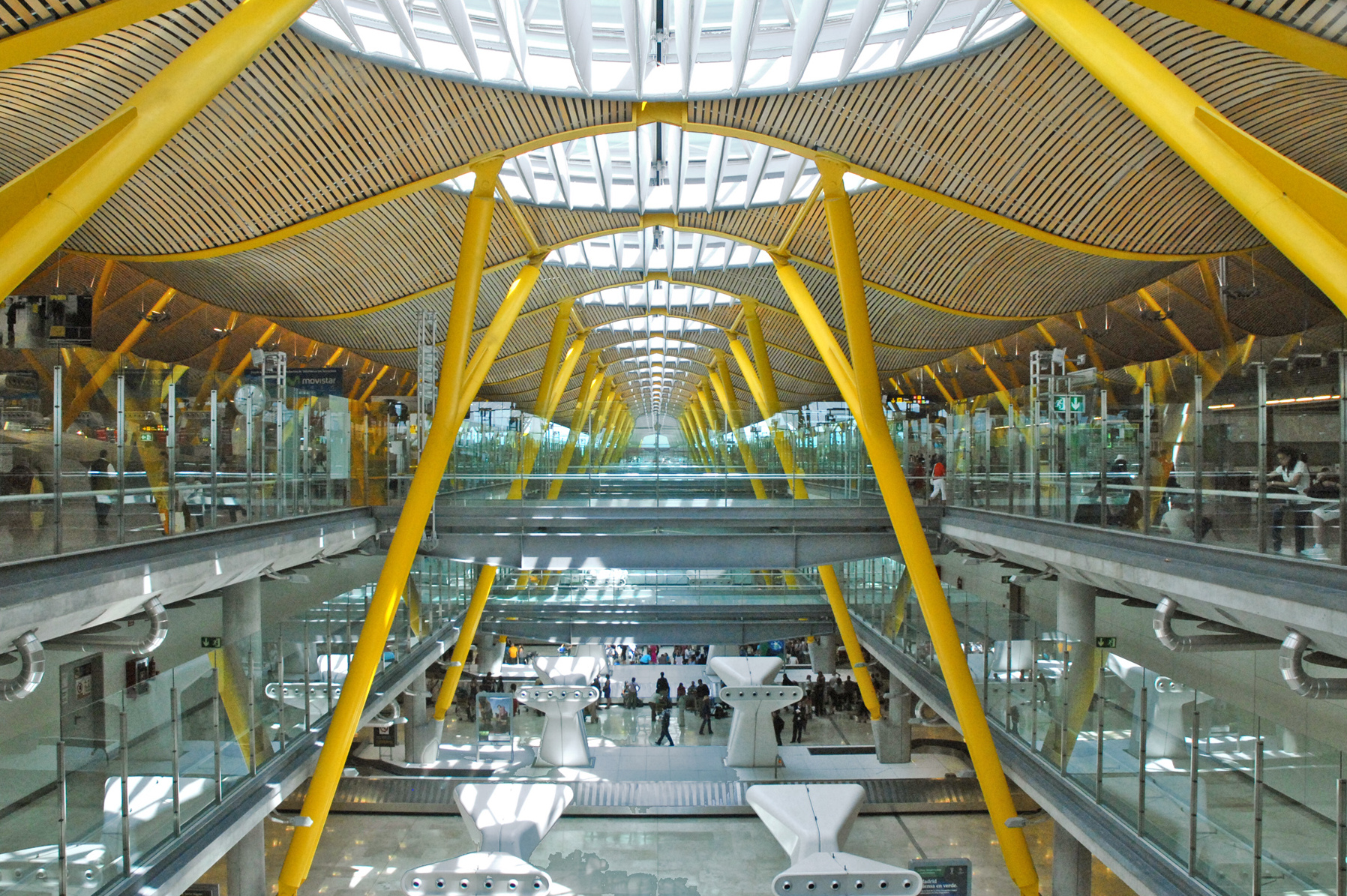
  Estudio Lamela. Terminal T4, Madrid-Barajas Airport
- Refurbishment of the New Terminal of the Gran Canaria Airport (2006-2014).
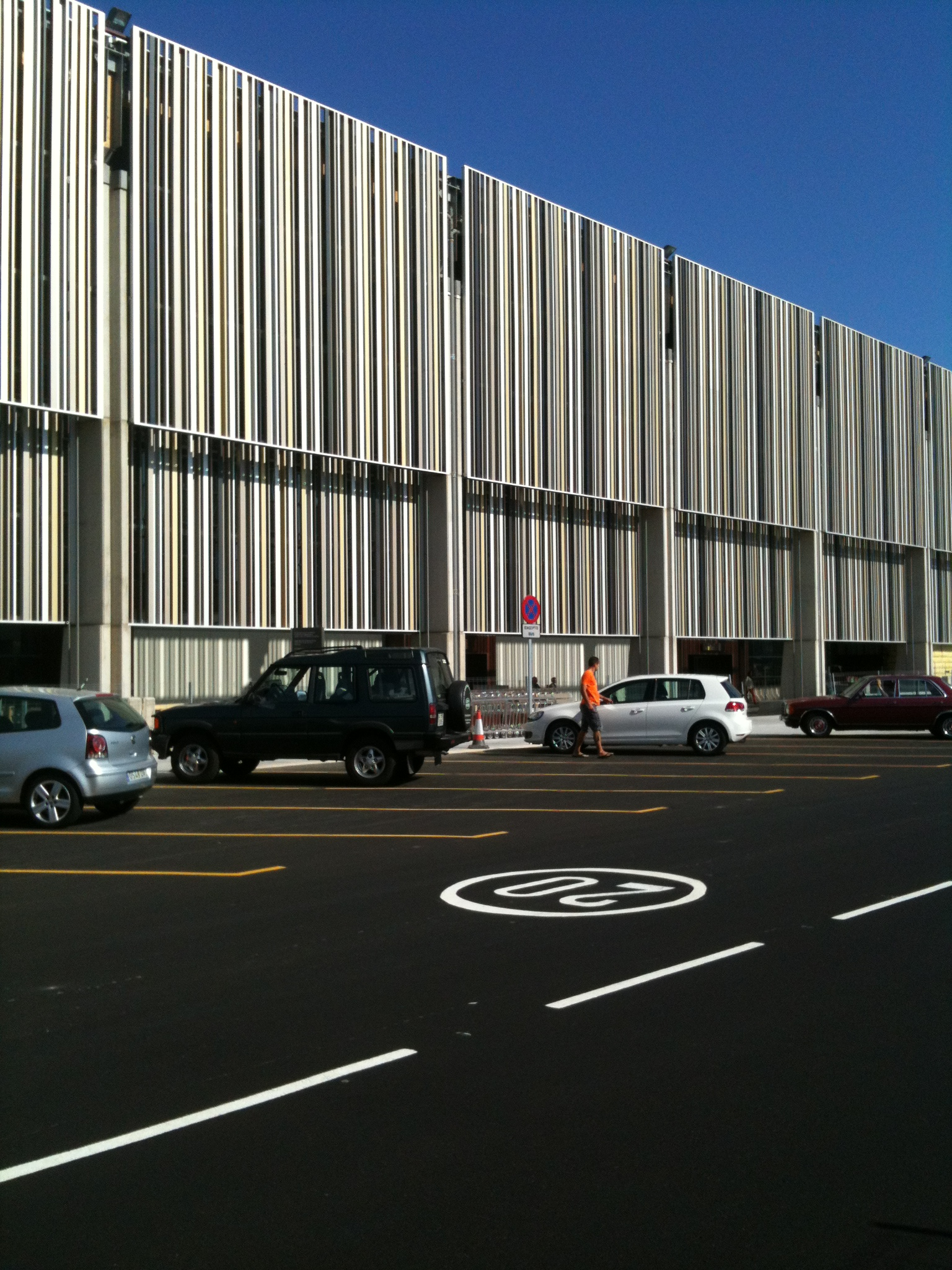
  Estudio Lamela. New Terminal of the Gran Canaria Airport
- Canalejas Complex (2012-2018) is a project in seven historic buildings in Madrid that will house a shopping arcade, high-level residences and the future Four Seasons hotel with 200 rooms.
- The future new Airbus Campus (2016), which will be the new headquarters of the European aeronautics company in the Community of Madrid.

=== Outside of Spain ===
- Poland: Terminal A of Warsaw Chopin Airport (2000-2015) designed for more than ten million passengers (2010-2012); construction of seven new stations for the Warsaw Metro Line II; the new football stadiums of Kraków (2010-2012) and Lublin (2013-2015); various residential buildings in Warsaw and Wroclaw; and the Pacific and Ocean office buildings (Warsaw).
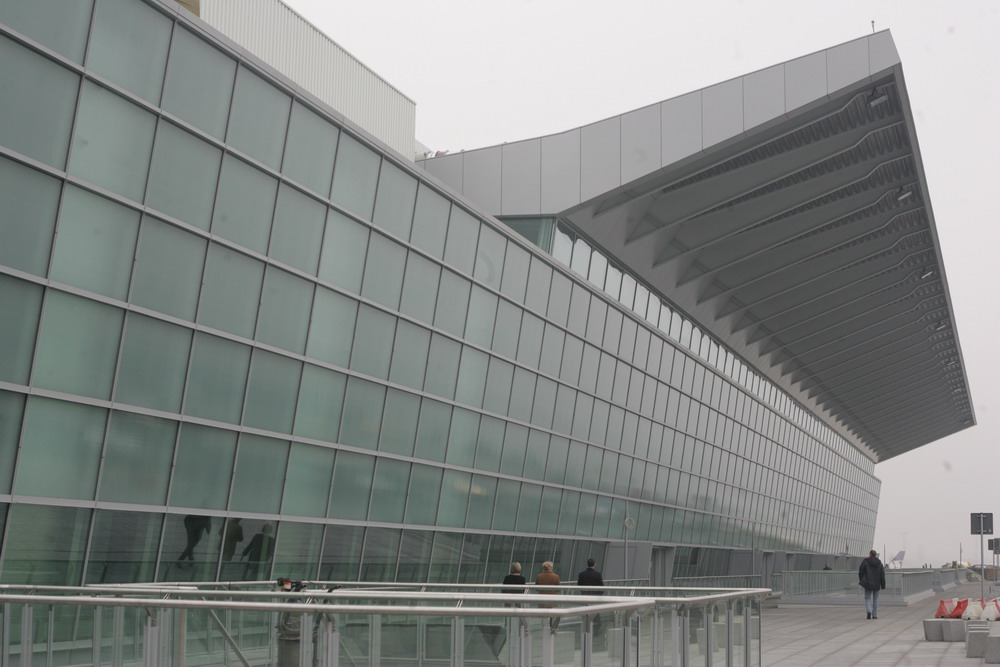
  Estudio Lamela. Terminal A of Warsaw Airport
- Mexico: Corporate Contact Center for Banco Santander in Querétaro with 2,000 telephone positions and 2,000 parking spaces; refurbishment and expansion of the Tijuana Airport Terminal for more than three million passengers; the Maranta residential tower complex in Mexico City; and other residential buildings in Querétaro.
- Panama: New General Hospital in the City of Veraguas in collaboration with AIDHOS architects.
- Qatar: New 40-floor “Marina Mix 004” office tower in Lusail City and the seven underground stations of the Light Railway Train (LRT) also in Lusail, near Doha.

== Awards ==
- Stirling Prize for Architecture for the work done in the T4 and T4S of the Madrid-Barajas Airport, a work in collaboration with RSH + P.
- The Madrid-Barajas Airport was named the 'airport with the best architectural design in the world' by National Geographic Traveler Magazine (2011).
- Pavés Prize for the Stadium of Lublin (Poland) (2015).
- National Prize of Electric Energy Saving for the Contact Center Banco Santander (2012).
- Prize for Best Construction 2010 - Stadium of Kraków (Poland).
- National IMEI Award to the Intelligent and Sustainable Building 2008 for the Contact Center Santander in Querétaro (Mexico) (2008).
- Madrid-Barajas, Best Airport in Europe. Best Airports Awards 2008.
- Madrid-Barajas, Global Airport of the Year 2008. Institute of Transport Management (ITM).

== Exhibitions of projects ==
- 2013. Estudio Lamela: 60 years of Architecture in Madrid. Roca Madrid Gallery. Madrid (Spain).
- 2010. Estudio Lamela (1954-2010). Fundación COAM. Exhibition that covered the most relevant works undertaken by the firm between 1954 and 2010 on the occasion of the endowment to the COAM Foundation of the documentation that illustrates the projects carried out during those years. Madrid (Spain).
- 2007. On Site: New Spanish Architecture. MoMA. Exhibition sponsored by the New York Museum of Modern Art (MoMA) that covered state-of-the-art Spanish architecture. Estudio Lamela participated with Terminal 4 of the Madrid-Barajas Airport. New York (USA).
- 2006. V Biennial of Architecture. Brasil.
- 2005. Lamela 50 years. Nuevos Ministerios Museum. Fomento Ministry. Madrid (Spain).
- 2002. Venezia Bienale. VIII Mostra Internazionale d´Árchitettura. Venice (Italy).
- 2000. II Latin American Biennial of Architecture and Engineering. Mexico City (Mexico).
