= Carlos Lamela =

Spanish architect

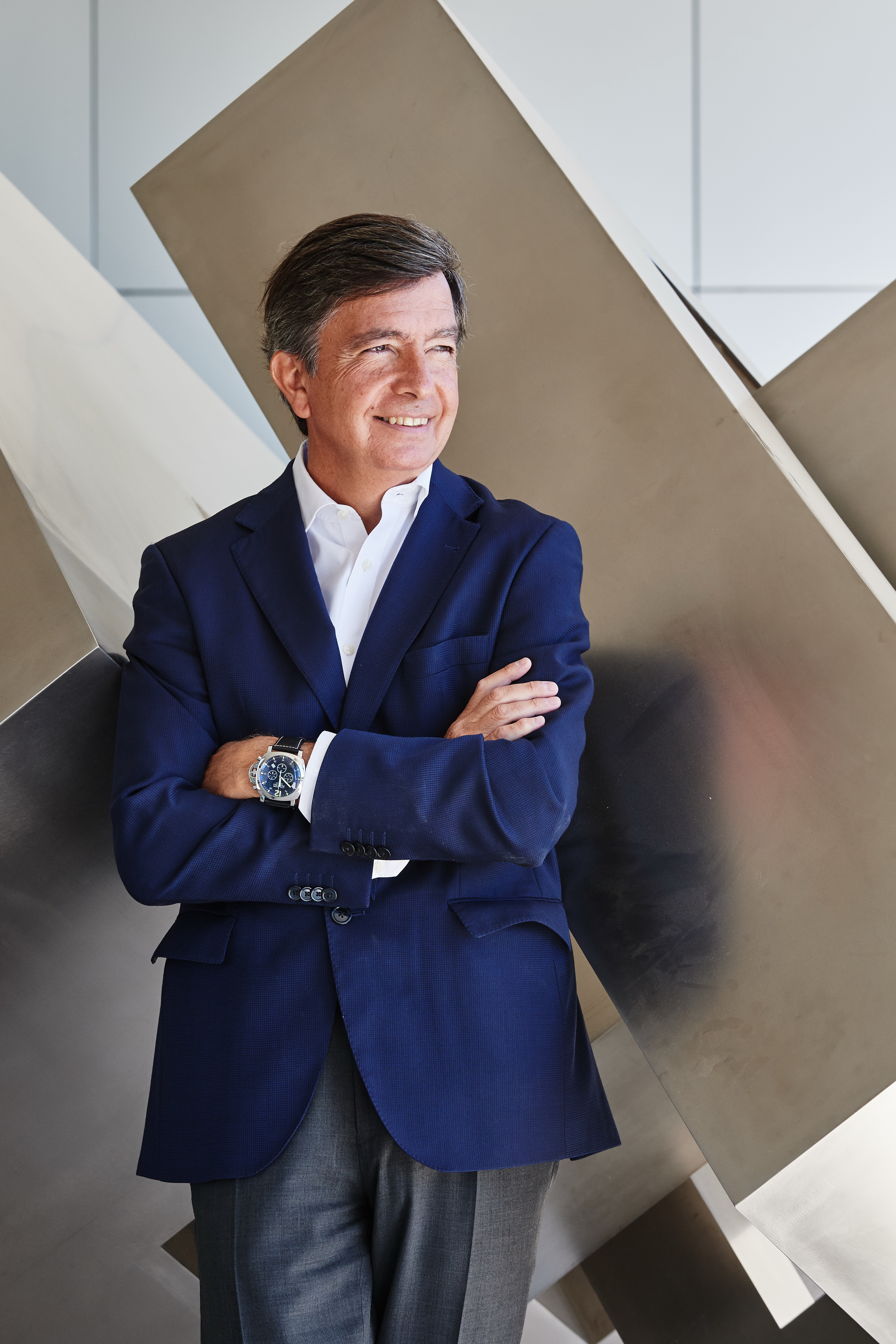
- Carlos Lamela in 2016
- Born: October 10, 1957; Madrid, Spain
- Education: Technical University of Madrid
- Occupation: Architect
- Practice: Estudio Lamela

Carlos Lamela de Vargas (born October 10, 1957, in Madrid) is a Spanish architect, owner and executive president of Estudio Lamela.

Superior architect by the Technical School of Architecture of Madrid in 1981 and "designer" by the UIA of Florence (Italy) in 1984. His entire professional career has been spent at the architecture firm of Estudio Lamela, founded by his late father, Antonio Lamela, in 1954, and of which he is currently the chief executive and owner. Works carried out by the company under his guidance, particularly the large public facilities such as airports and soccer stadiums, has earned international awards and recognition by critics. See the Estudio Lamela article for the major projects.

He is former president of the Spanish chapter of the Urban Land Institute.
