= Arena Lublin =

Football stadium in Lublin, Poland

Coordinates: 51.2319°N 22.5575°E

Motor Lublin Arena
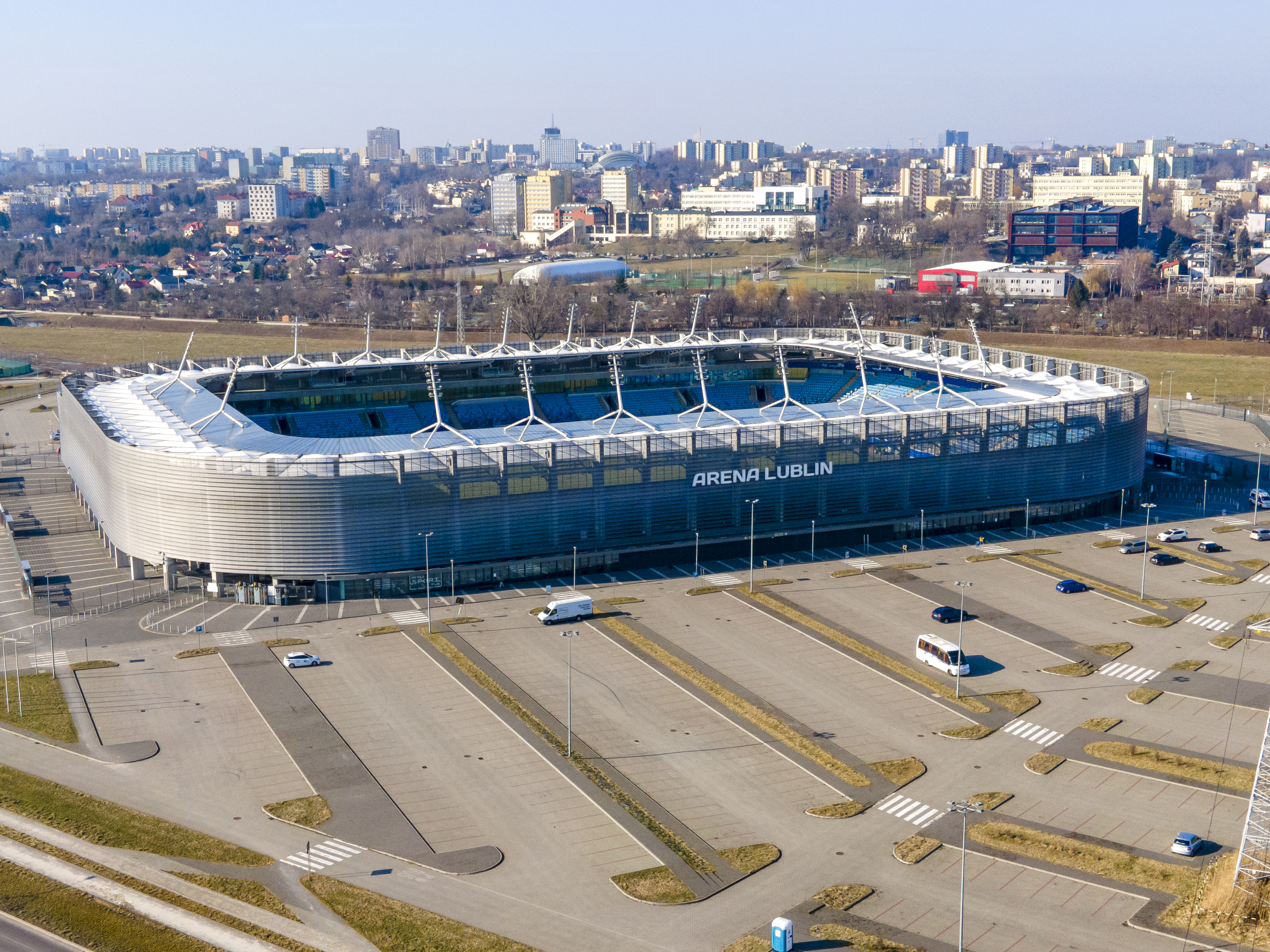
- Interactive map of Motor Lublin Arena
- Location: ul. Stadionowa 1 Lublin, Poland
- Owner: City of Lublin
- Operator: MOSiR Lublin
- Capacity: 15,247
- Surface: Field (Grass)
- Record attendance: 14,914 (Motor Lublin vs Legia Warsaw), 2021–22 Polish Cup Round of 16
- Field size: 105 m × 68 m (344 ft × 223 ft)

Construction
- Groundbreaking: December 2012
- Built: 2011–2014
- Opened: 9 October 2014
- Cost: 136 million PLN
- Architect: Estudio Lamela

Tenants
- Motor Lublin (2014−present); Górnik Łęczna (2016−2017); KS Lublinianka (2015−2016): Major sporting events hosted; 2017 UEFA Euro Under-21 2019 FIFA U-20 World Cup 2019–20 Polish Cup final 2020–21 Polish Cup final

Website
- Official website

The Arena Lublin, known for sponsorship reasons as the Motor Lublin Arena since February 2025, is a football stadium located in Lublin, Poland. It is the home ground of Motor Lublin. The stadium holds 15,247 people.

== History ==
On 2 September 2011, construction company Budimex signed a contract to undertake and complete the stadium's construction for PLN 136.2 million by September 2013, and the first visuals and work schedule appeared 3–4 weeks from the date of signing the contract. The stadium was designed by the award-winning Estudio Lamela architectural office, which in the early 1990s prepared plans to modernize and enlarge Santiago Bernabéu Stadium in Madrid and designed the new Cracovia stadium. The main construction works were planned to start in the spring of 2012, but later the city decided to redesign the facility so as to increase the commercial space for lease. The first shovel on the construction site was driven in December 2012, and the final construction date was June 2014.

The opening match was played on 9 October 2014, between Poland U20 and Italy U20, as Poland won 2–1, and Mariusz Stępiński scored the first historic goal at the new stadium. The game was spectated by 13,850 viewers.

The first match for points was played on 25 October 2014, when two clubs from Lublin, Motor and Lublinianka, faced each other in a III liga Lublin-Podkarpackie match. The game ended in a 1–1 draw, with Lublinianka's captain Erwin Sobiech scoring the opening goal in the 45th minute. The match was attended by 6,500 spectators. It was also the city's first derby played under artificial lighting.

It hosted the 2019–20 Polish Cup final game. It was the arena for the 2020–21 final as well.

On 18 February 2025, Motor Lublin became the title sponsor of the stadium. The commercial name of the stadium will be Motor Lublin Arena until the end of 2027.

== International events ==
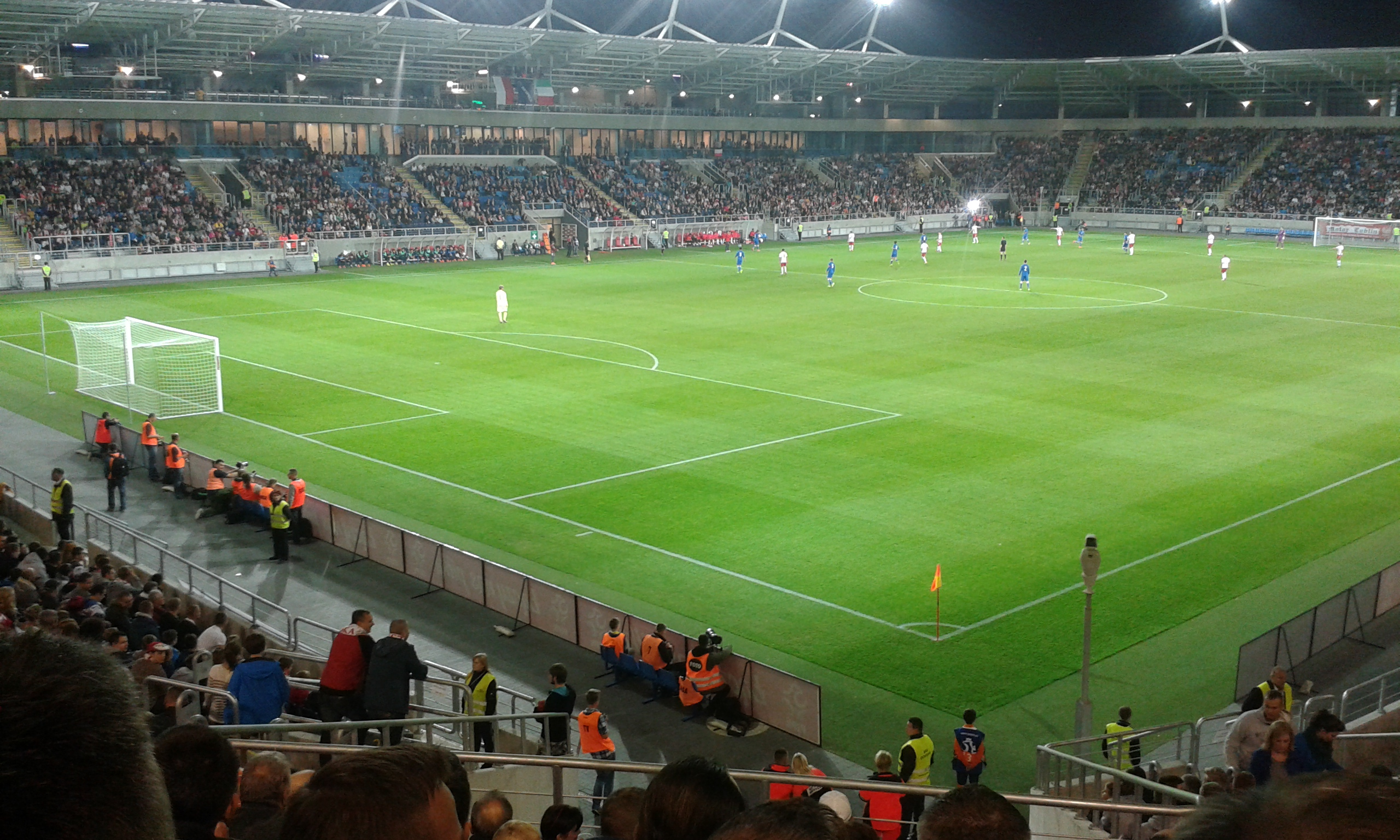
Arena Lublin

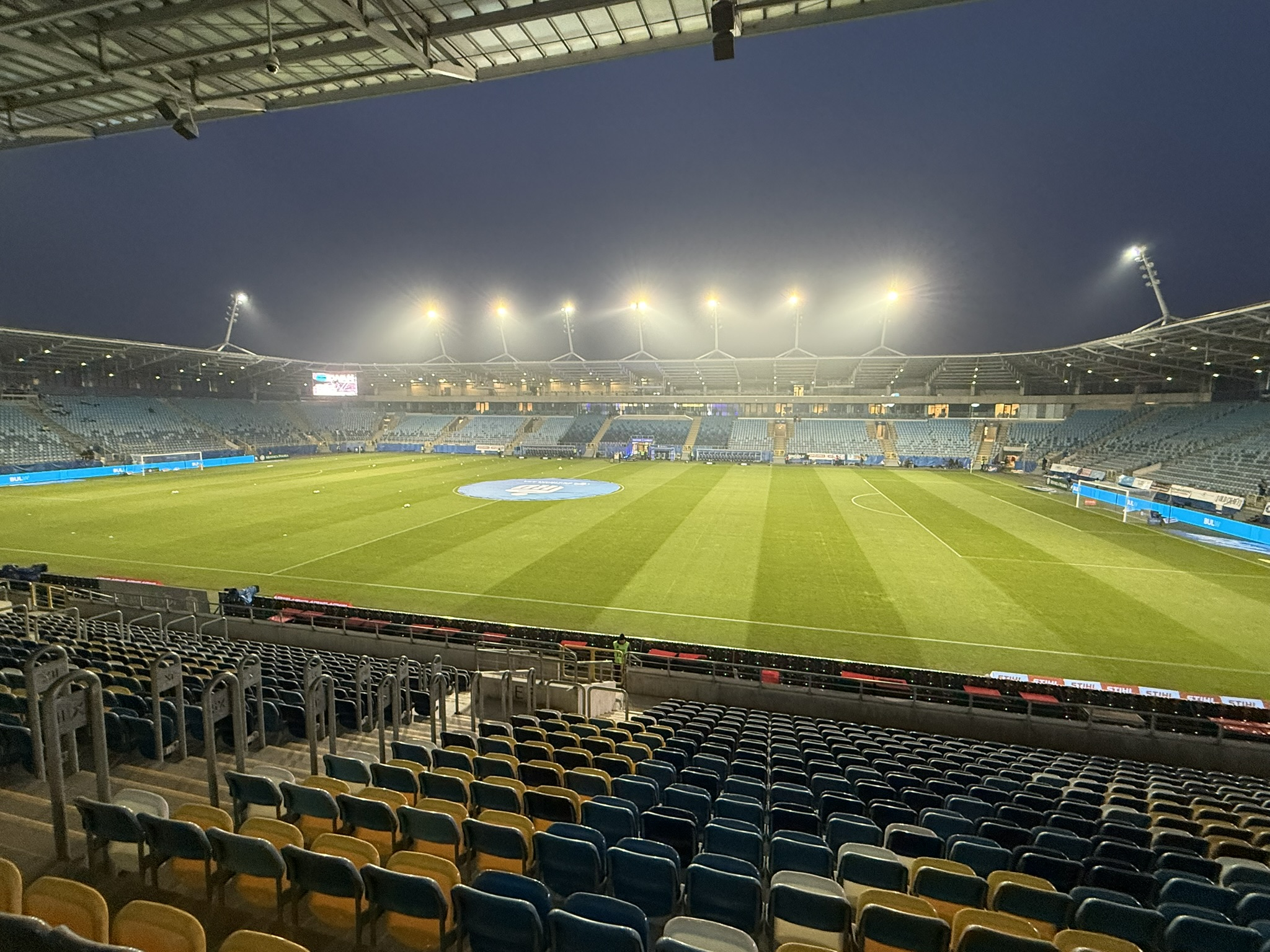
Motor Lublin Arena in February 2025

It was one of the venues for the 2019 FIFA U-20 World Cup.

On 24 March 2021, the 2022 FIFA World Cup qualification match between Estonia and Czech Republic was played in the stadium, due to COVID-19 pandemic restrictions in Estonia.

== Motor matches with the highest attendance ==
As of 2 February 2021

Nr	Attendance	Date	Host	Result	Opponent	Competition	Source
1.	8919	11.06.2016	Motor Lublin	0–1	Olimpia Elbląg	II liga play-offs	
2.	6500	25.10.2014	Motor Lublin	1–1	KS Lublinianka	III liga	
3.	6024	10.10.2015	Motor Lublin	0–2	Śląsk Wrocław	Friendly	
4.	5786	25.05.2016	Motor Lublin	2–0	Polonia Przemyśl	III liga	
5.	5127	18.06.2015	Motor Lublin	1–0	KS Lublinianka	III liga	
6.	4575	24.03.2018	Motor Lublin	1–2	Resovia	III liga	
7.	4341	18.11.2017	Motor Lublin	0–0	KSZO Ostrowiec Świętokrzyski	III liga	
8.	4207	13.05.2016	Motor Lublin	2–2	Avia Świdnik	III liga	
9.	4190	11.05.2019	Motor Lublin	1–1	Stal Rzeszów	III liga	
10.	4171	9.06.2018	Motor Lublin	1–0	Avia Świdnik	III liga	

== See also ==
- List of football stadiums in Poland
- Lists of stadiums
