= Mutua Madrileña =

Spanish insurance company

Mutua Madrileña, S.A.

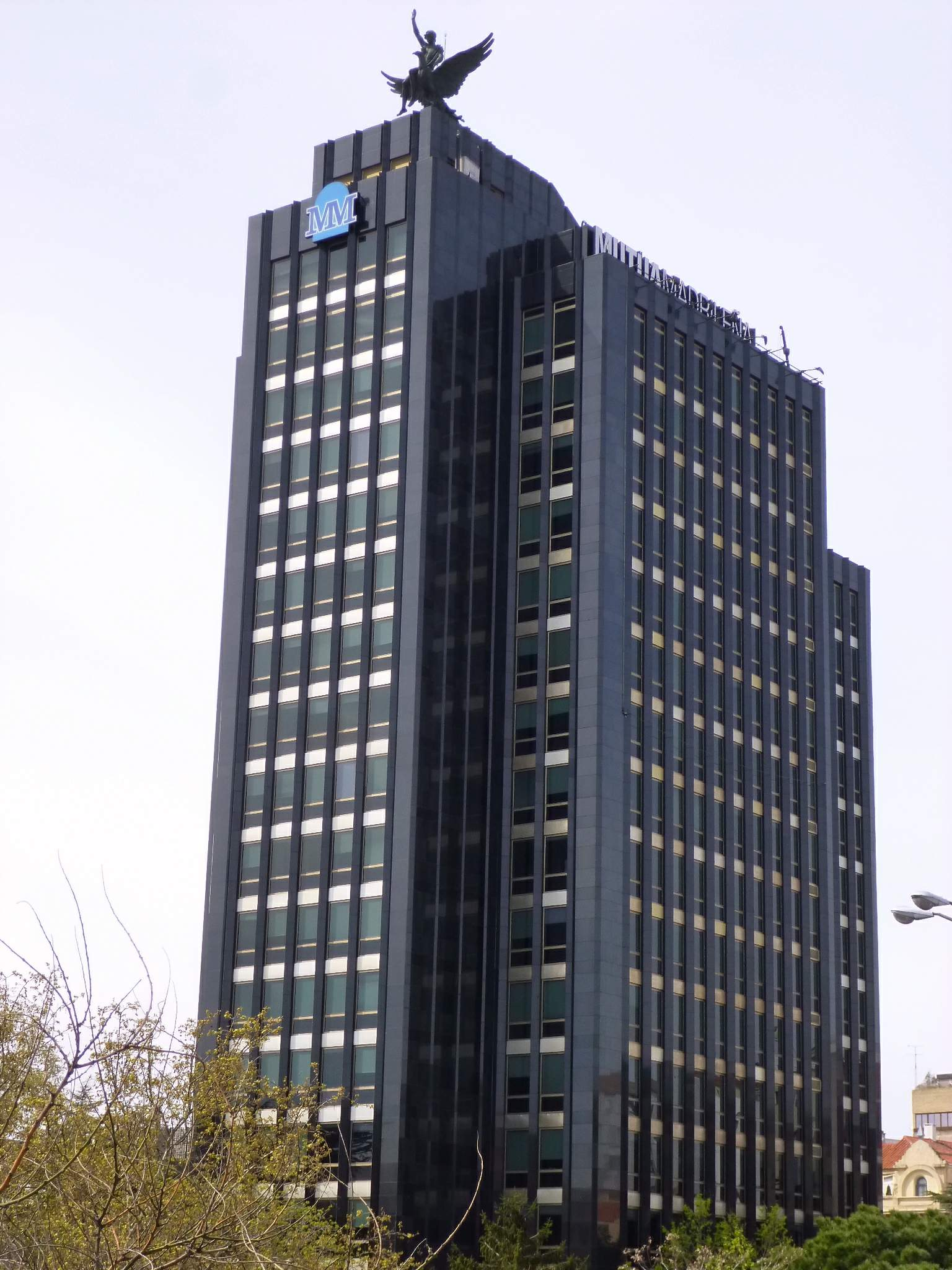
- Headquarters in Madrid, Spain
- Company type: Sociedad Anónima
- Industry: Insurance
- Founded: 1930; 96 years ago
- Headquarters: Madrid, Spain
- Key people: Ignacio Garralda Ruiz de Velasco (chairman and CEO)
- Products: Life and non-life insurance, investment funds, pensions
- Revenue: ▲€5.336 billion (2018)
- Net income: ▲€530.643 million (2018)
- Total assets: ▲€12.035 billion (2018)
- Number of employees: ▼1,900 (2018)
- Website: www.mutua.es

Mutua Madrileña, S.A. also known as La Mutua, is by its joint venture with Vida Caixa, the largest Spanish insurance company as both Vida Caixa and Mutua Madrileña occupy the first and third position (respectively) of the Spanish Insurance Company Ranking in 2020 by GWP (Gross Written Premium). Founded in 1930, it provides life, automobile, health, and accident insurance, as well as pension and investment funds. It has an international footprint in Colombia and Chile since 2019 with the acquisition of 45% of Seguros del Estado (Colombia) and the acquisition and control of 60% of BCI Seguros (Chile), which are the second biggest and biggest companies in Colombia and Chile respectively.

In 2011, it bought 50% of SegurCaixa Adeslas, the leading health insurance company in Spain. With an investment of more than 1,000 million euros, the purchase became the largest bancassurance operation ever carried out in Spain.

== Products ==
- Investment securities
- Life insurance

== Formula One sponsorship ==
From the 2006 Spanish Grand Prix, the company sponsored the Renault F1 team. The Mutua Madrileña branding appeared on the race cars, drivers' suits and team clothing. This coincided with the company's new corporate image.

After the 2007 Formula One season, the company declared the move of the sponsorship from Renault F1 to McLaren-Mercedes with Fernando Alonso.

After the 2008 Formula One season, the company declared the move of the sponsorship from McLaren-Mercedes back to Renault F1 with the return of Fernando Alonso to Renault.

During the 2009 Formula One season, Mutua Madrileña terminated its contract with Renault after the Renault Formula One crash controversy, in which Renault was found guilty of getting Nelson Piquet Jr. to intentionally crash during the 2008 Singapore Grand Prix, to help Alonso to win the race. The company will continue to sponsor Alonso.

In 2017, Mutua Madrileña was ranked 10th in the ranking published by the Merco Institute of the most responsible companies with the best corporate governance. In addition, Mutua Madrileña is the best company to work for in Spain, according to the latest annual ranking prepared by the magazine Actualidad Económica.

== See also ==
- Economy of Spain
