= Antonio Lamela =

Spanish architect (1926–2017)

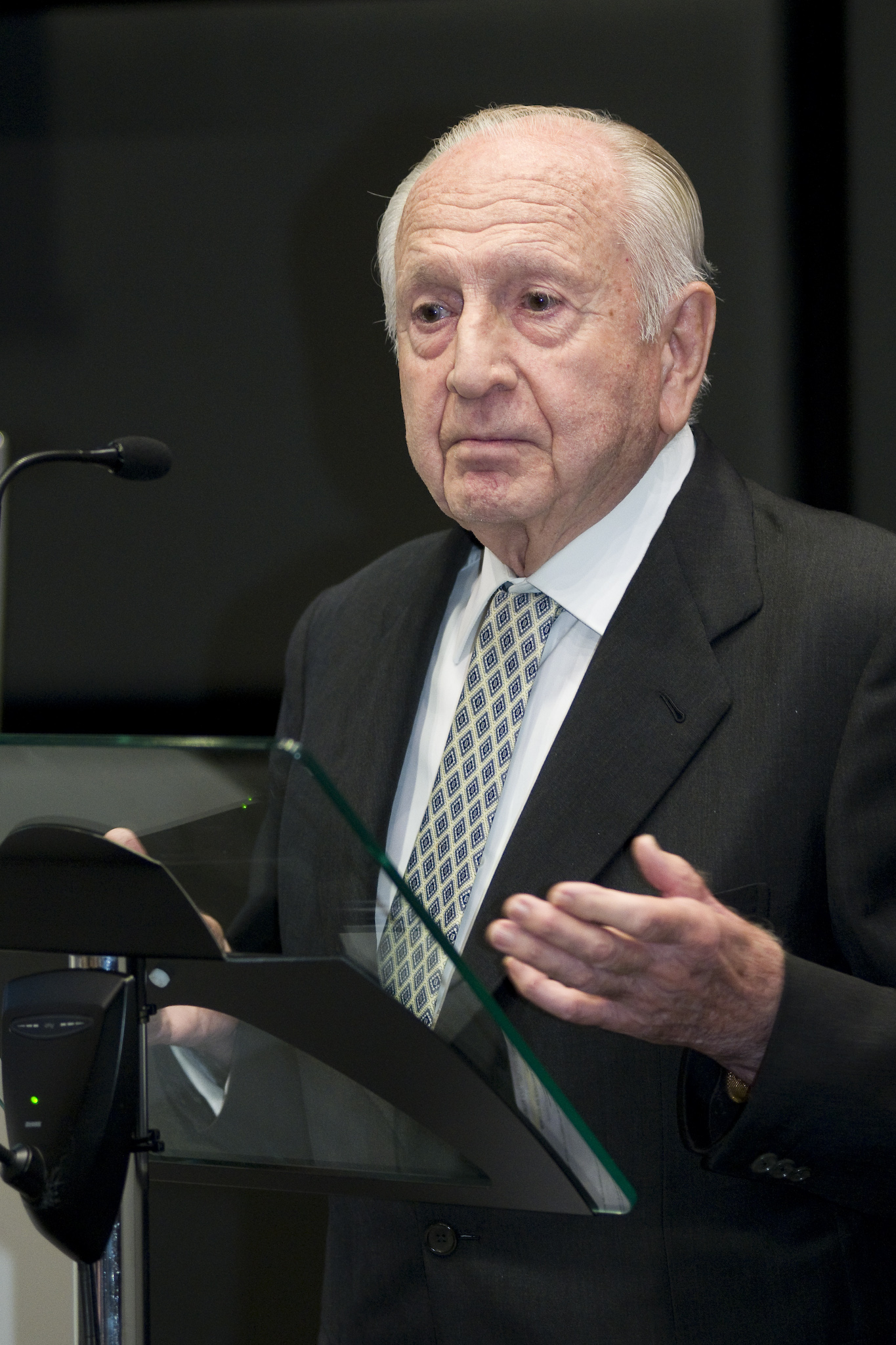
- Antonio Lamela in 2010
- Born: December 1, 1926; Madrid, Spain
- Died: April 1, 2017 (aged 90); Madrid, Spain
- Education: Technical University of Madrid
- Occupation: Architect
- Practice: Estudio Lamela
- Buildings: Santiago Bernabéu Stadium; Adolfo Suárez Madrid–Barajas Airport; Torres de Colón

Antonio Lamela Martínez (December 1, 1926 – April 1, 2017) was a Spanish architect.

== Biography and works ==
Lamela was born in Madrid. He graduated from the Technical School of Architecture of Madrid (ETSAM) in 1954 and received his doctorate in 1959. In 1954 he founded Estudio Lamela, the architecture firm where he has spent his entire professional career.

Between 1956 and 1958, Lamela built the first residential building in Madrid that had air conditioning, individual rubbish chutes, interior ventilation shunts, mobile partition walls, complete exterior lighting, garden terraces, raised portals and suspended light façades. These elements, structures and design were new in those years. This building was followed by other modern buildings and residential complexes in the capital, and even entire neighbourhoods for thousands of inhabitants such as San Ignacio de Loyola. In 1960, he designed the first supermarket in Spain.

A pioneer in the area of Spanish tourist architecture, he designed the first motels and hotels in the country that had a contemporary conception and design. He participated in the tourist boom that began in the 1960s and created new residential complexes in coastal zones of the island of Majorca and the Costa del Sol.

He was the first architect in Spain to develop the concept of "office landscape", which applies to the headquarters of Estudio Lamela itself, then located at number 34 O'Donnell Street in Madrid.

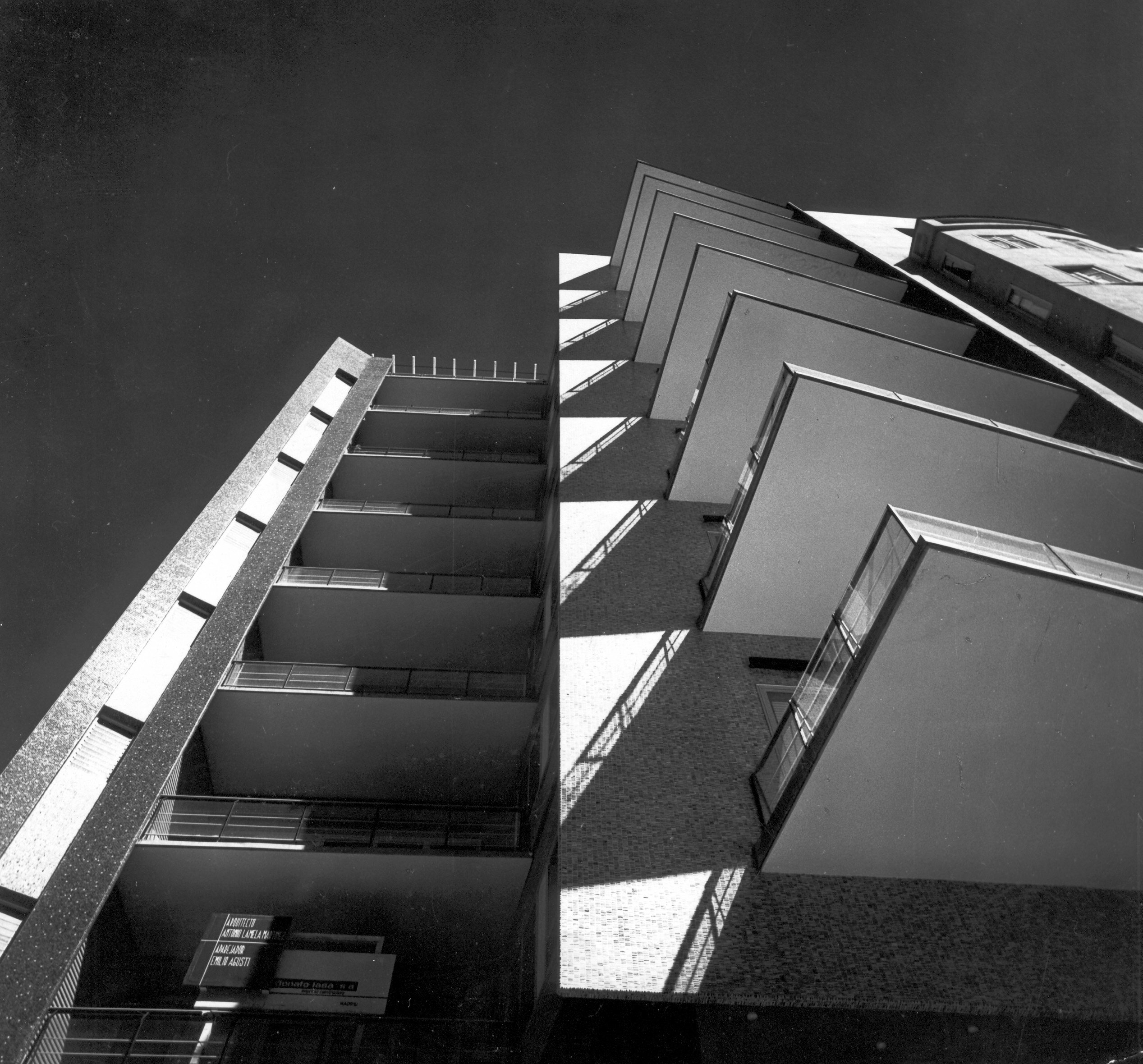
Office and housing building in the O'Donnell 33 st in Madrid

This work place introduced, among other novelties, the suppression of enclosed spaces and the incorporation of continuous ceilings with lighting and sound absorption panels, carpeted floors and walls and broken facades – a set of techniques designed to achieve better solar and light control.

Lamela introduced in Spain the concept of "suspended architecture" with the Torres Colón project in Madrid, undertaken together with the engineer Fernández Casado. The structural system of the towers was completely designed in reinforced concrete using high strength post-tensioned concrete. In this way, it departed from the most widespread technique of constructing "hanging" buildings, which usesheads of structural steel, to instead adopt a "suspended architecture" solution: the floor slabs are supported at their perimeter by the outer tie rods, which are not tensioned as in the case of the "hanging architecture", but compressed against the post-tensioned concrete structure of the head-beams. This upper structure, within which the installation machinery is located, receives the load from the 21 suspended slabs and transmits it to the core, through which it finally descends to the foundations in the ground. When they were built, the Colón Towers held the world record for the number of suspended slabs, 21, using the pre-stressed concrete technique. The result is a building one hundred metres tallwith twenty suspended floors. The Eduardo Torroja Institute presented this project as a Spanish technological contribution at the World Congress of Architecture and Public Works held in New York in 1975, and it was considered "the building with the most advanced construction technology until 1975".

That sense of innovation and modernity led Lamela to create in 1973 the first company of Integrated Project Management. It was called Gestión y Control and with it he sought to respond to this idea that he has explored from the beginning of his professional career: to propose a practice in which the architect controls all phases of the project. Responding to this same philosophy, he founded other companies related to his professional field such as ADI (Architecture, Decoration and Engineering), which offered services in which all three disciplines were integrated.

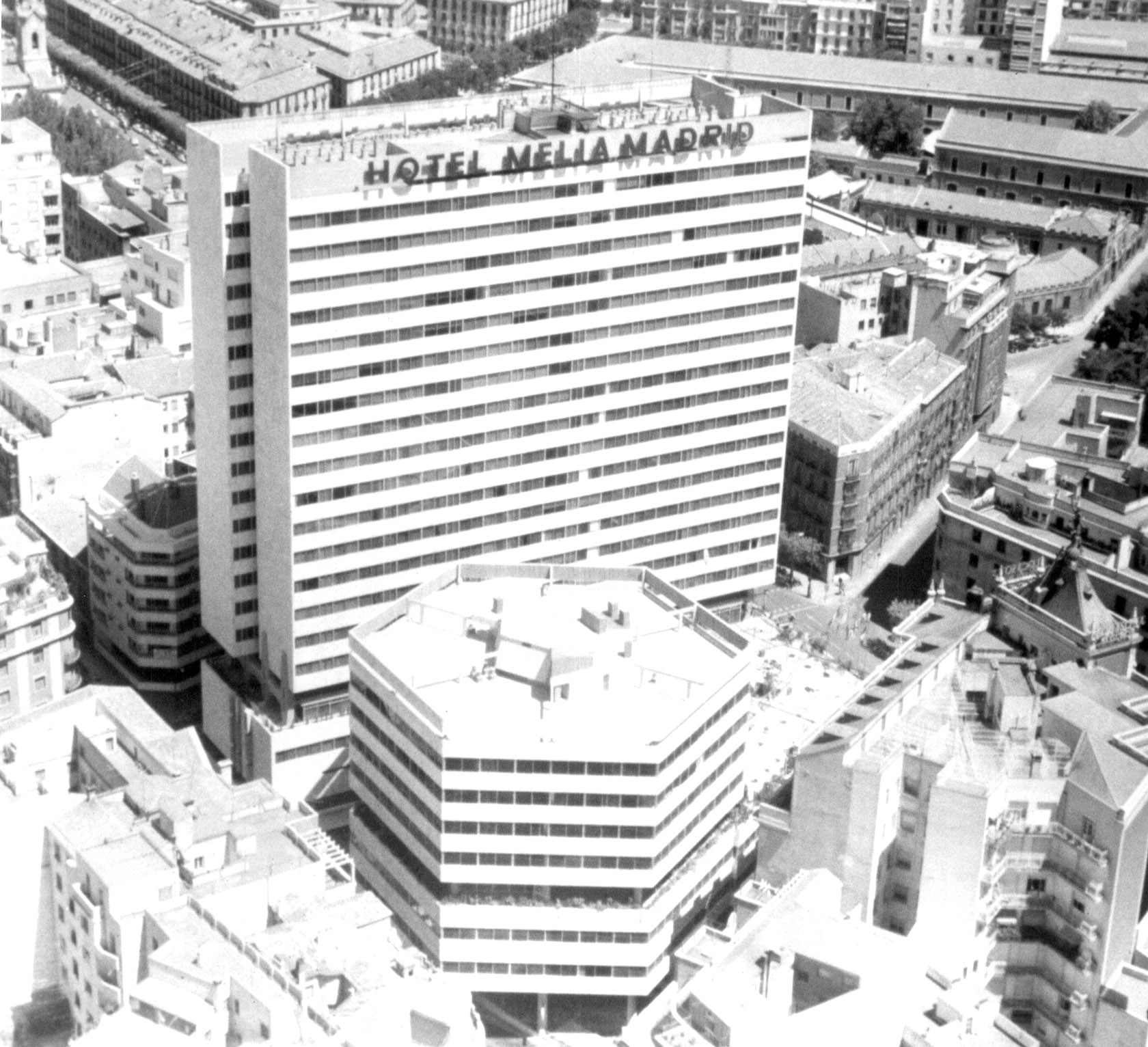
Hotel Meliá Princesa in Madrid

=== Innovation in materials ===
In 1965 Antonio Lamela introduced ready-mixed concrete to Spain through the Prebetong brand. The company soon expanded into different geographical areas (Madrid, Aragon, Costa del Sol, Baleares and Canary Islands). In practice, they were the first concrete-mixer trucks to circulate on Spanish roads.

In 1968 Lamela started the company Shockbeton, dedicated to making pieces of architectural concrete. It was the first time in Spain that concrete prefabricated structures for facades were created, with results of great technical and aesthetic importance. Another of the leading companies that he launched in those years is CTC, a pioneering firm in the industrial supply of packaged bricks.

=== Santiago Bernabéu Stadium and Terminal 4 of the Barajas Airport ===
In Madrid, Antonio Lamela concluded two reference works. The first was the remodelling and extension in 1988 of the Santiago Bernabéu Stadium (Lamela holds membership number 59 for Real Madrid Football Club).

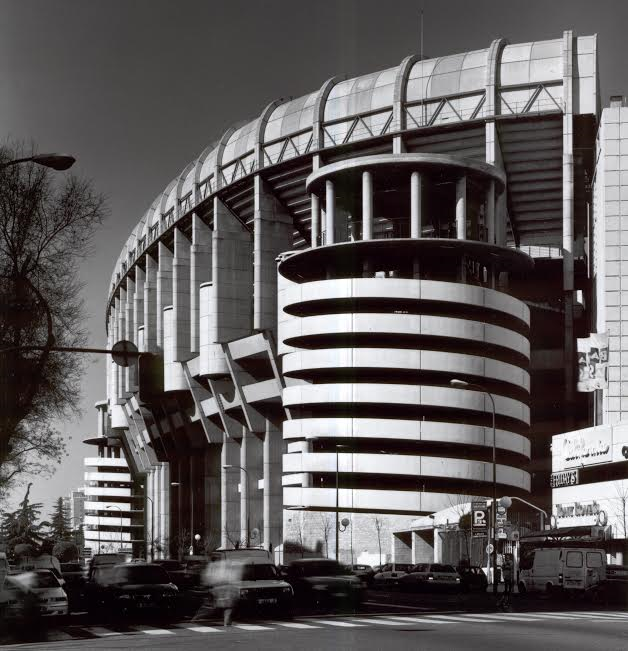
Detail of the extension of the Santiago Bernabéu Stadium

The second is the award-winning Terminal 4 of the Barajas Airport (since 2014, the Adolfo Suárez Madrid-Barajas Airport), along with Richard Rogers.

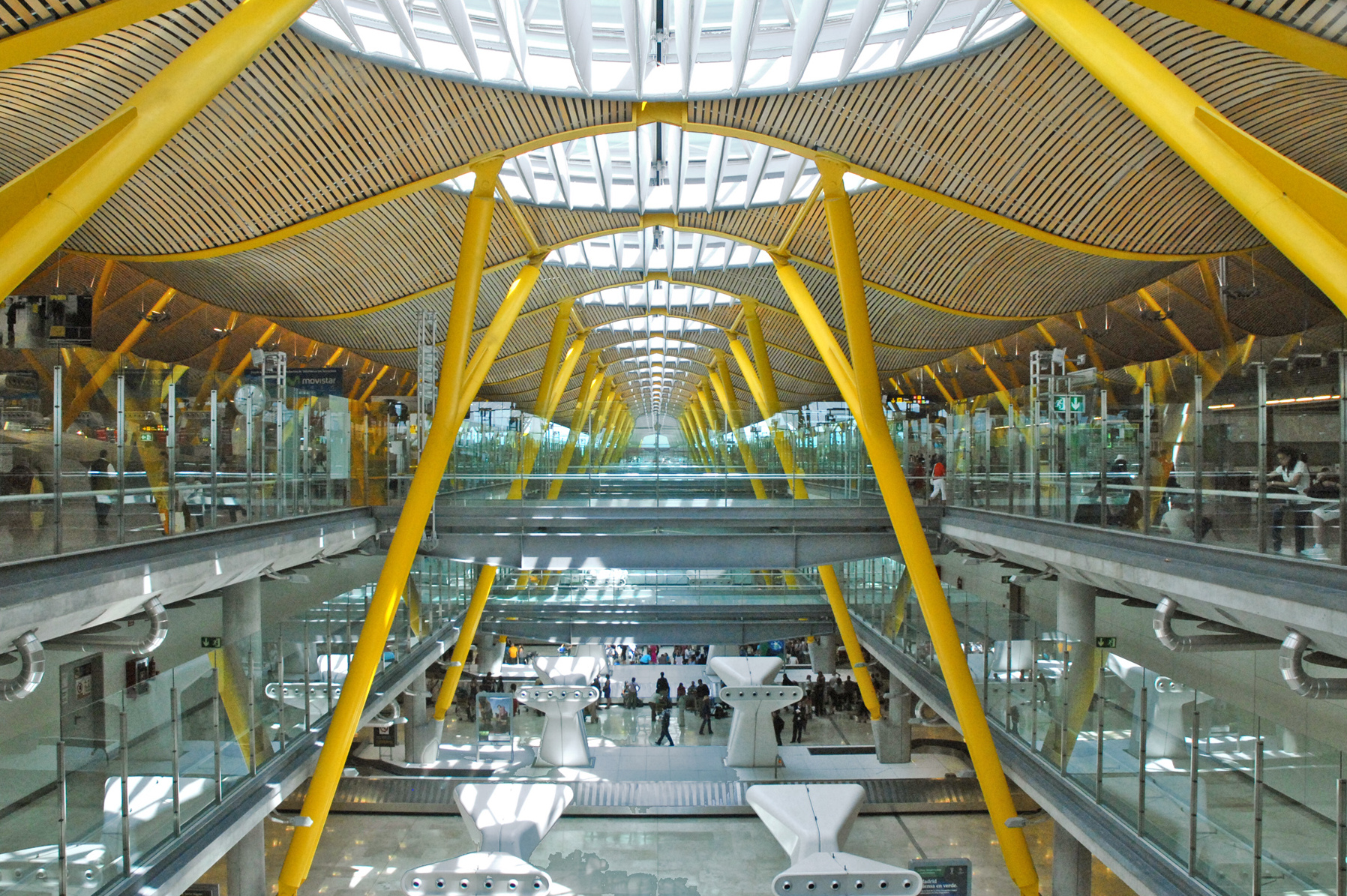
Terminal 4 of the Barajas Airport

=== International organizations and publications ===
In 1976 Lamela founded in Spain the Club of Rome, an international organization that seeks to improve the world with tools such as education, social integration and the fair and equitable development of the planet.

Antonio Lamela has written several books and publications, as well as numerous papers, writings and essays on land use, water policies, conservation of the environment, and even on the protection of the Spanish language.

The architecture of Antonio Lamela is also a history of more than 1,500 projects and achievements of land use planning. Some have been collected in the book "Lamela: Urbanística y Arquitectura. Realizaciones y Proyectos 1954-1992"as well as in the supplement "Proyectos y Realizaciones 1990-2003". His architecture narrates by itself an entire epoch of the history of Spain.

Architecture has been for Antonio Lamela a path towards other disciplines. Humanist and thinker, he is the inventor of the new sciences "Geoísmo" and "Cosmoísmo", which he developed in the 1975 book of the same name. These new disciplines constitute a synthesis of urbanism on a planetary scale. In these books he advocated Sustainable architecture, at a time when that ecological term did not exist. At the time, Lamela defined it as "naturalism".

== Most relevant projects ==
- 1956 - Swissair Offices (Madrid).
- 1956 - Homes at 33 O'Donnell Street (Madrid).
- 1958 - Housing in the Paseo de la Castellana (Madrid).
- 1959 - El Hidalgo Motel.
- 1962 - Roca Marina Group, La Caleta Building and Apartotel Magalluf (Palma de Mallorca).
- 1963 - Meliá Princesa Hotel (Madrid).
- 1963 - Playamar, La Nogalera and Meliá hotel complex in Torremolinos (Málaga).
- 1964 - Offices at 34 O'Donnell Street (Madrid).
- 1964-1970 - San Ignacio de Loyola neighbourhood (Madrid).
- 1965 - Galaxia Group (Madrid).
- 1967 - Torres Colón (Madrid).
- 1972 - The Pyramid Building (Madrid).
- 1973 - Bank building at 27 Genova Street (Madrid).
- 1984 - Laroc Condominium - Florida (US).
- 1988 - Enlargement and remodelling of the Santiago Bernabéu Stadium 1989-1993 and 2002-2005 (Madrid).
- 1997 - New Terminal T-4 of the Madrid-Barajas Airport – joint venture with Initec, Richard Rogers and TPS.

== Exhibitions ==
- 2013. Madrid. Roca Madrid Gallery: “Estudio Lamela: 60 years of Architecture in Madrid”.
- 2010. Madrid. COAM Foundation: “Estudio Lamela 1954-2010”. Exhibition of the most relevant works from the history of Estudio Lamela on the occasion of the endowment to the COAM Foundation of the documentation of projects between 1954 and 1999.
- 2006. New York (USA). On Site: New Spanish Architecture. T4 Madrid-Barajas Airport.
- 2005. Madrid. Ministry of Housing, New Ministries Exhibition Centre: Anthological exhibition "Lamela 1954-2005" commemorating the 50 years of professional activity.

== Awards and distinctions ==
- 1998. Membership Number (99) of the Real Academy of Doctors of Spain. Plaza 99, section 9, of Architecture and Fine Arts.
- 2005. Grand Cross of the Order of Civil Merit. Council of Ministers. Royal Decree 111/2005 of January 31. B.O.E. February 1, 2005.
- 2005. Gold Medal of Merit in the Work. Council of Ministers. B.O.E. November 18, 2005.
- 2006. King Jaime I Prize "Urbanism, Landscape and Sustainability". King Jaime I Foundation Awards.
- 2006. Member of the High Advisory Council on Research, Development and Innovation.Valencia. King Jaime I Awards.
- 2006. Chairman of the Academic Council of the Camilo José Cela University
- 2006. Stirling Prize 2006 Madrid-Barajas Airport
- 2006. Urbanism Prize City Hall of Madrid. December 1, 2006.
- 2007. Professor Doctor Honoris Causa. University of Camilo José Cela.
- 2010. Madrid Community. Award for European Excellence 2010. Madrid, June 2010
- 2010. Official College of Architects of Madrid. Honorary Member of COAM. Madrid, October 2010

== Publications ==
- 1946. “Cálculo Integral y Diferencial”, Volume I: “Cálculo Integral”. Volume II: “Ecuaciones Diferenciales”. Madrid. Of particular note is the unprecedented contribution: "Integración de ecuaciones diferenciales con exponente fraccionario", which were considered "non-integrable".
- 1976. “Cosmoísmo y Geoísmo”. National Publisher. Three editions out of print. (Madrid). Translated into English, 1977. ISB: 978-84-40095-33-6
- 1985. “Apuntes Sobre Arquitectura Mallorquina”. Editor Luis Ripoll, Palma de Mallorca. Out of print. ISBN 84-85434-40-4
- 2005. “Lamela 1954 -2005”. Publisher Tanais, Madrid. Two issues. Out of print. ISBN 84-49601-21-5
- 2006. “Ciudad y Salud”. Publisher Sanofi Aventis Foundation, Madrid.
- 2007. “Estrategias para la Tierra y el Espacio”. Two volumes. Synthesis in English. Publisher Espasa, Madrid. ISBN 978-84-67025-17-0
- 2008. “Del idioma Español y su futuro”. Publisher Espasa, Madrid. ISBN 978-84-67028-66-9
- 2008. “El idioma Español y los negocios”. Publisher Espasa, Madrid. ISBN 978-84-67028-66-9
- 2014. “El agua en España. Nuevos lagos sustentables”. Lid Publisher, Madrid. ISBN 978-84-8356-830-9

== Institutions and associations ==
- Co-founder of the Spanish Chapter of the Club of Rome – Madrid (1976)-
- Honorary Member of the Círculo de Bellas Artes – Madrid (1979)-
- Membership number "Hispania Nostra", Spanish cultural association for the defence of the environment, ecology, cultural, historical and artistic values.
- Vice President and founding partner of the Spanish Energy Club (1985)-
- Counsellor of Professional Cooperation of the Superior Centre of Architecture. Antonio Camuñas Foundation – Madrid (1990)-
- Member of the Academic Council of the "Antonio Camuñas" Foundation.
- Member of the Spanish Institute of Energy.
- Founding President of the Association for the Defence of Reservoirs of Entrepeñas, Buendía and zones of influence (ADEB) (1992).
- Member of the Governing Board of the Society for International Studies of the Centre for Scientific Research (CSIC) – Madrid (1993).
- Founding Member of the Water Forum – Madrid (1996).
- Founding Member and Director of the Spanish Club of the Environment (CEMA).
- Member of the Spanish Committee of the World Energy Council.
