= Leon Stynen =

Belgian architect

- Léon Stynen
- Léon Stynen
- Born: 15 July 1899; Antwerp, Belgium
- Died: 13 May 1990 (aged 90)
- Occupation: Architect

Léon Stynen (15 July 1899 – 13 May 1990) was a Belgian architect, urban planner and designer, from Antwerp. Some of his buildings have been categorized as "refined" Brutalist architecture and modern architecture. He has been called one of Belgium's greatest architects of the 20th century.

== Early life ==
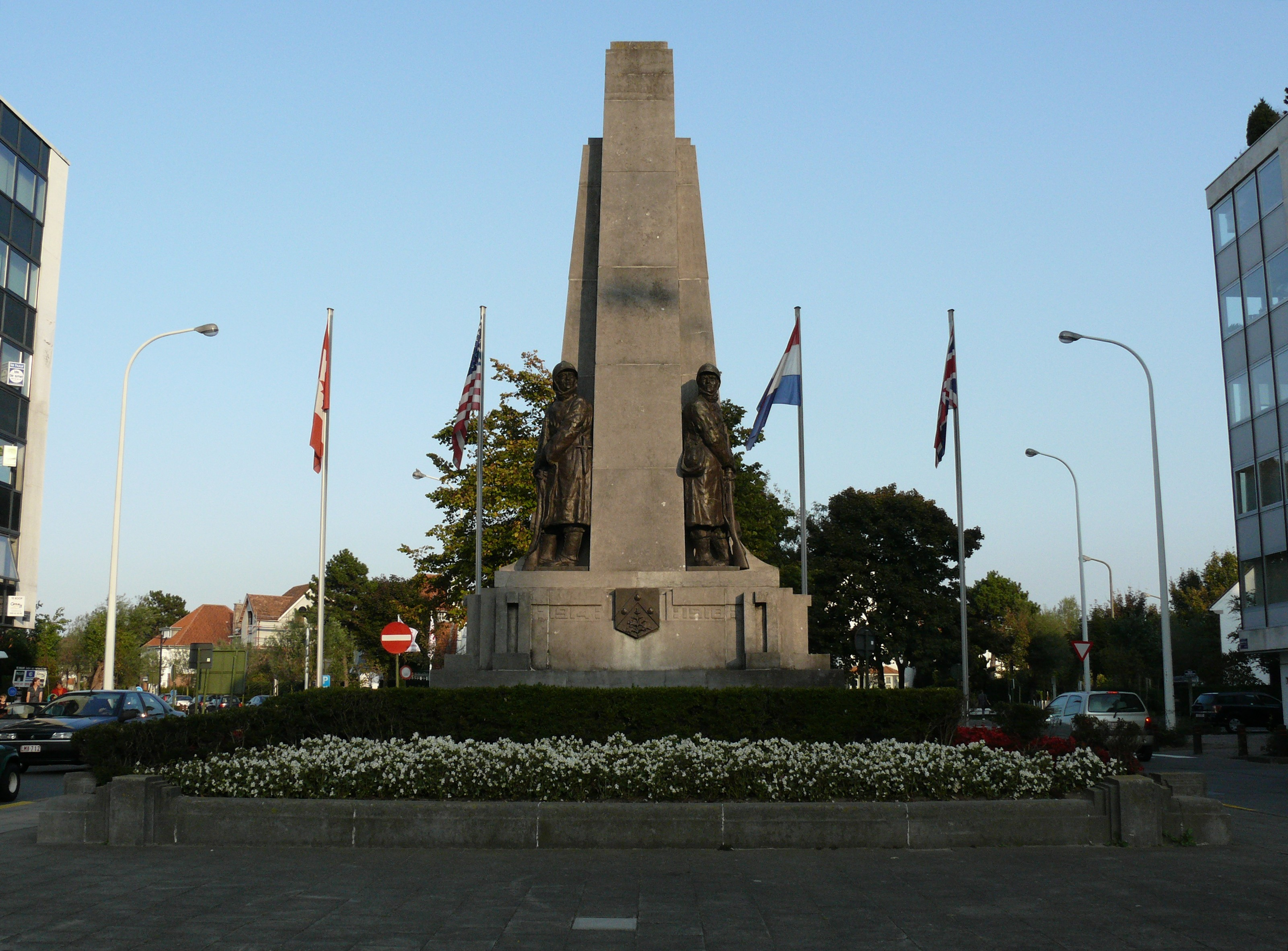
Stynen's contest-winning war memorial: Herdenkingsmonument

His father was sculptor and designer Jean-Baptiste Stynen. In 1921 Leon Stynen graduated from the National Higher Institute in Antwerp. Also in 1921, Stynen won a competition to design a war monument in Knokke.

The contest-winning memorial Stynen designed (Herdenkingsmonument 1914–1918) was to commemorate the World War I veterans from Knokke. A total of 16 designs were submitted and Stynen's was accepted. He collaborated with a sculptor named Guillaume Dumont to make the monument. There is a plaque affixed to the monument on which Dumont's name is misspelled "Dupont". The monument features four standing figures representing soldiers: they lean against a center column. The sculpture was inaugurated 11 June 1922.

== Career ==
Stynen was active designing buildings from the 1920s to the 1970s. He was also an educator who influenced the architects from Belgium. In 1963 he was made the first president of Belgium's Order of Architects. He was called one of Belgium's greatest architects, and there are many buildings in Flanders which were designed by Stynen, and they still exist to display the Modern architecture style.

In the 1920s Stynen designed four casinos in Belgium. The first was the Knokke Casino. He designed the casino in the style of Le Corbusier. In designing the casino Stynen also was influenced by his background n Beaux-Arts architecture and the Art Deco movement.

He experimented with different styles of architecture and eventually settled on Modernism. By the 1930s he was a respected architect in Belgium. In 1939 he was asked to work with Henry van de Velde and Victor Bourgeois to design the Belgian pavilion for the 1939 New York World's Fair. The building was an Avant-garde example of Modernist architecture. The structure was supposed to be disassembled and returned to Belgium after the fair, but as a result of the 1940 German invasion of Belgium the building remained in the United States. Twenty-seven different institutions wanted the building but it was granted to Virginia Union University.

In 1963, he experimented with a technique that allowed a cantilevered facade on the BP-building Antwerp. All of the floors and the facade of the building are held up with steel cables and supported from the rooftop beams. The building still stands today.

In 1968 Stynen and Paul De Meyer's designed Church of Sint-Rita in Harelbeke. It was called an example of Brutalist architecture. The building looks like a pyramid from the outside and inside there is an entirely open space with a skylight.

== Gallery ==
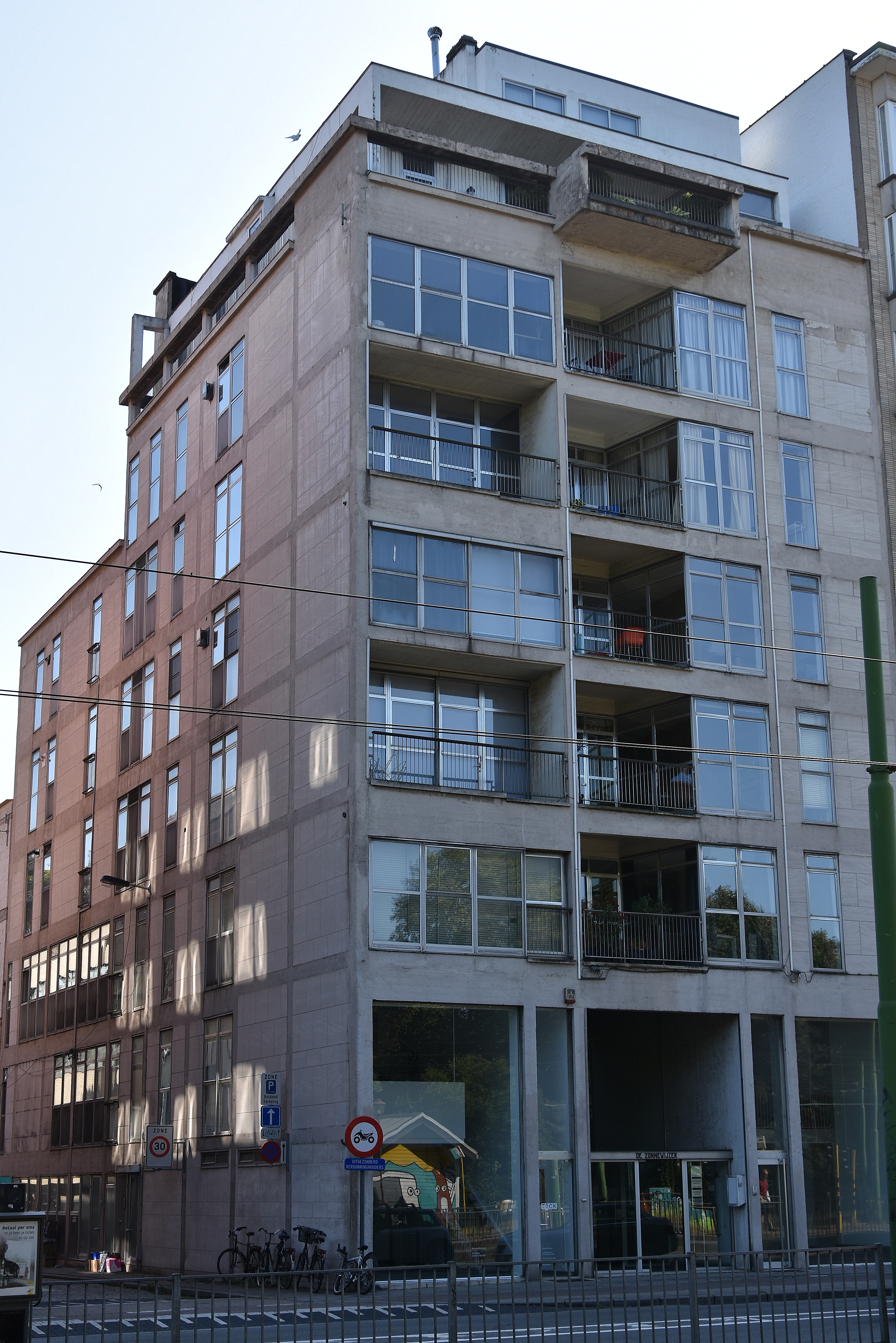
The sundial at the Mechelsesteenweg in Antwerp

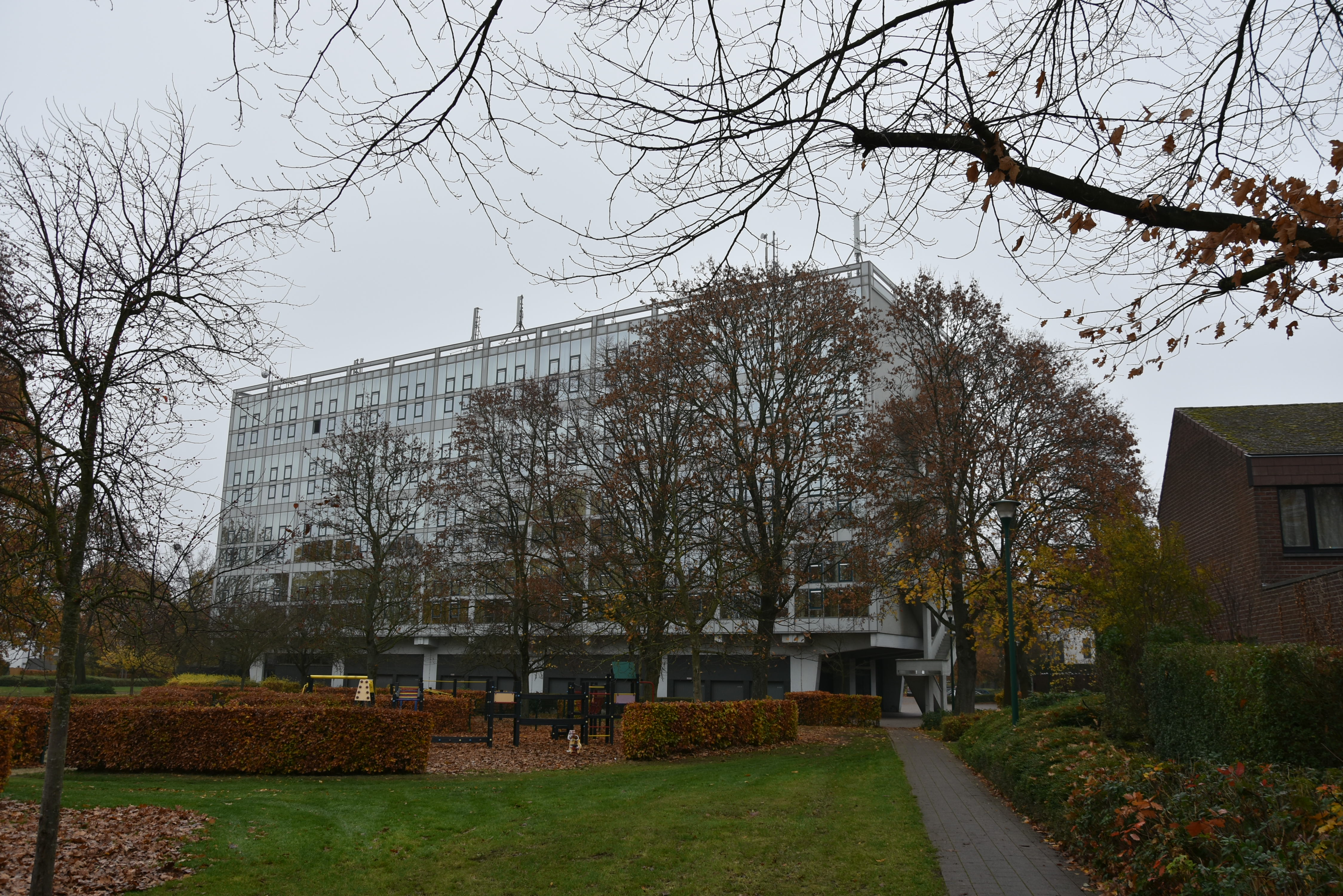
King Albert building of the Park District Casablanca in Kessel-Lo

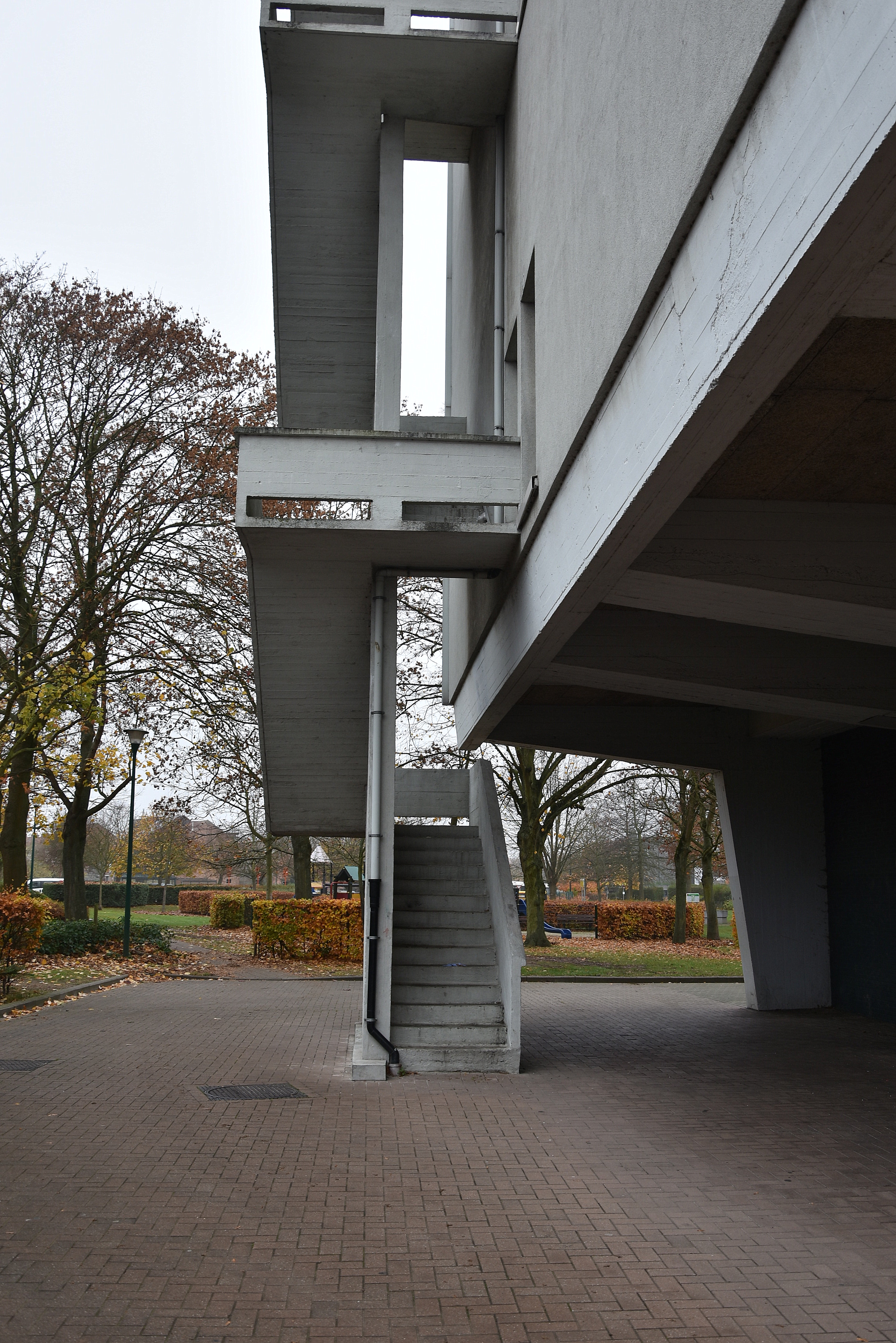
King Albert building of the Park District Casablanca in Kessel-Lo

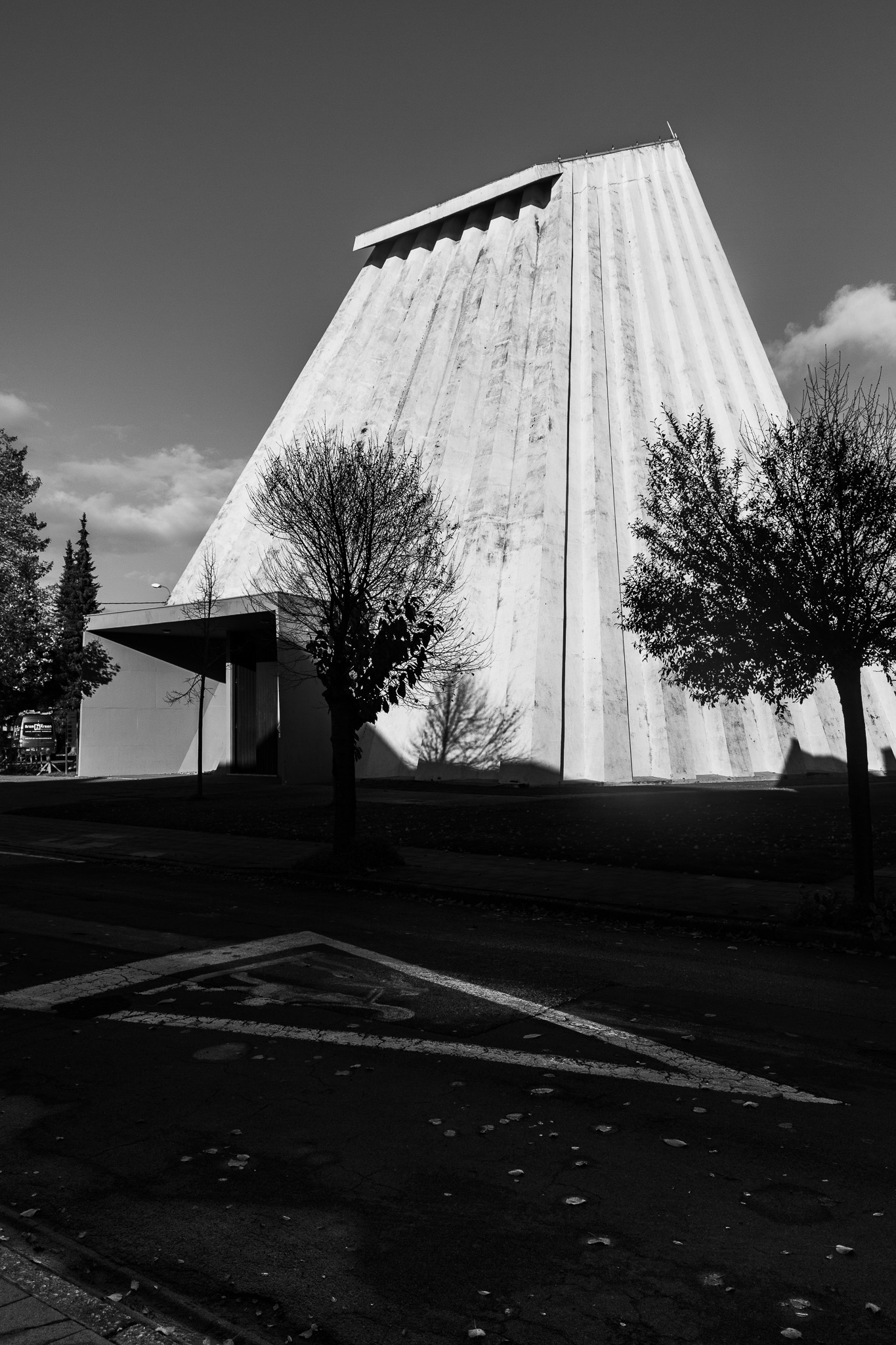
Sint Ritakerk in Harelbeke

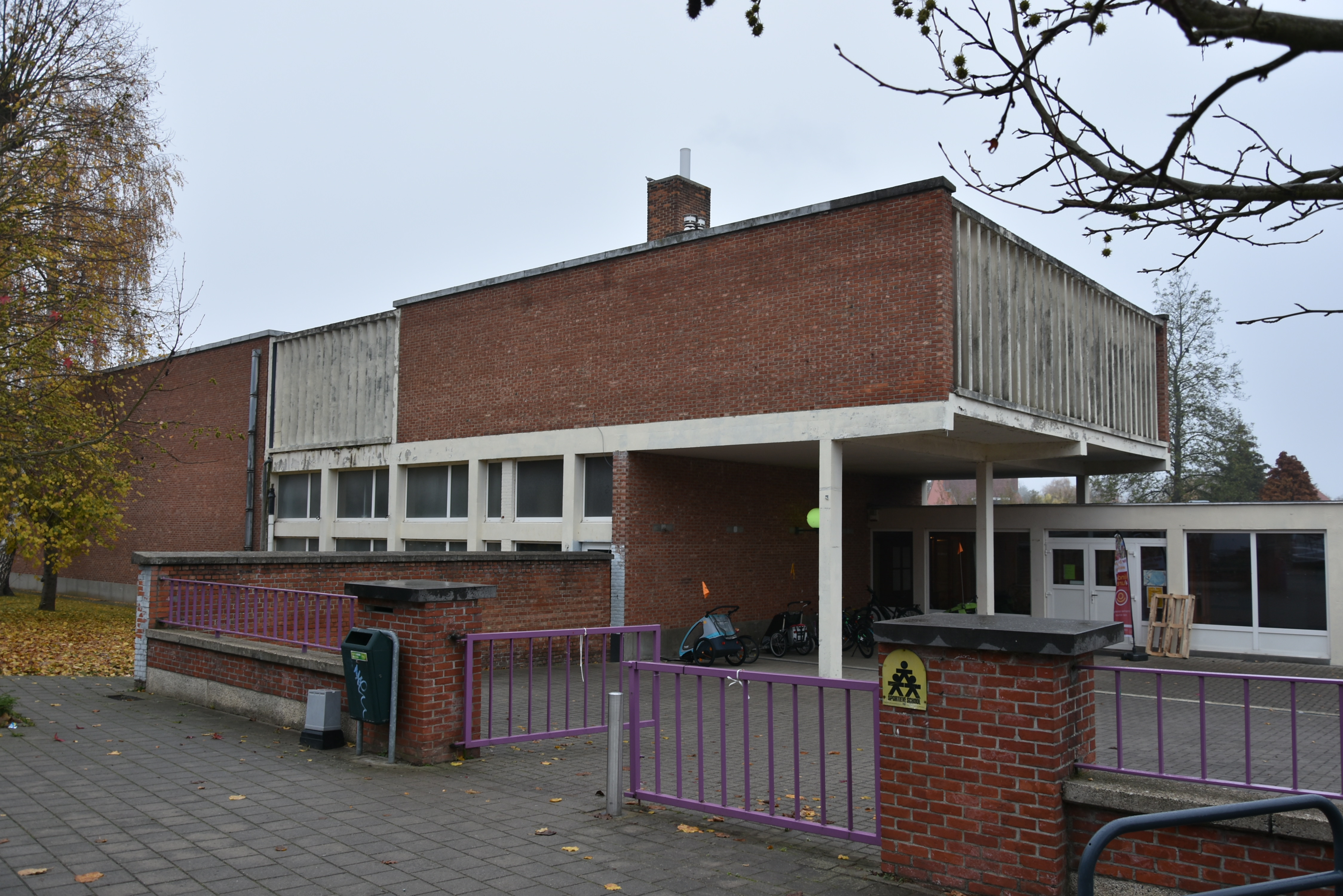
Heffel primary school in Kessel-Lo

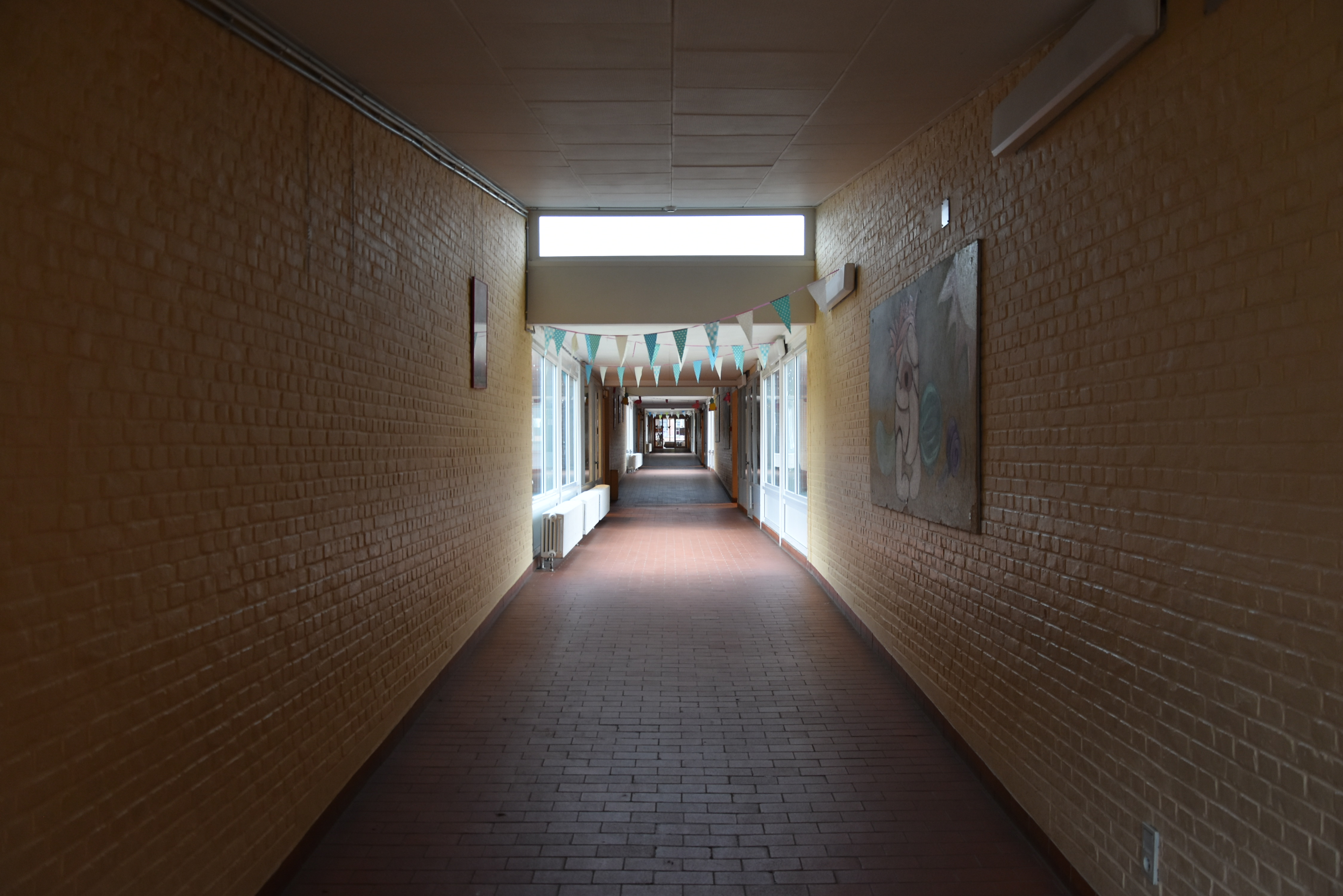
Heffel primary school in Kessel-Lo

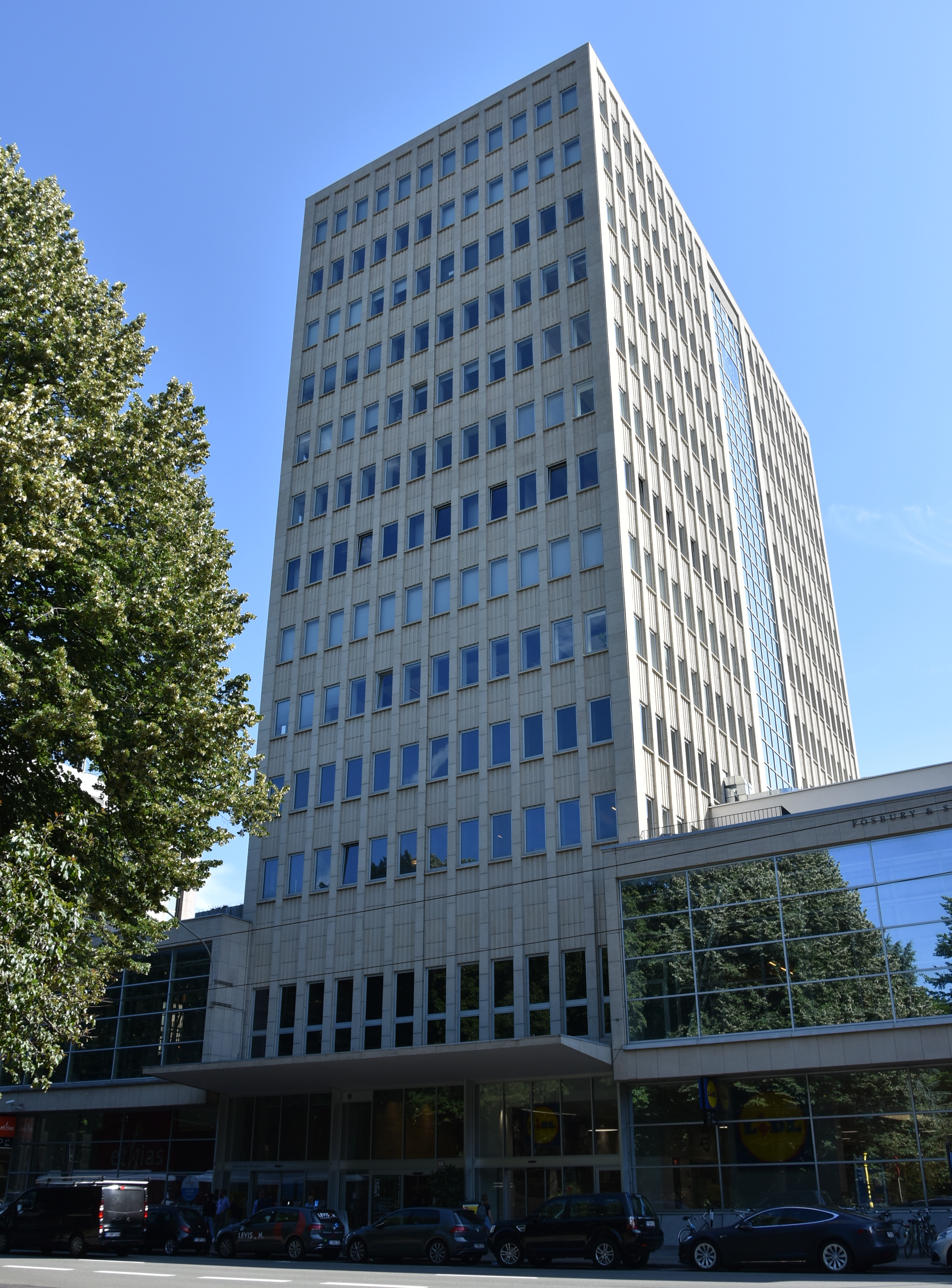
Former EBES building in Antwerp

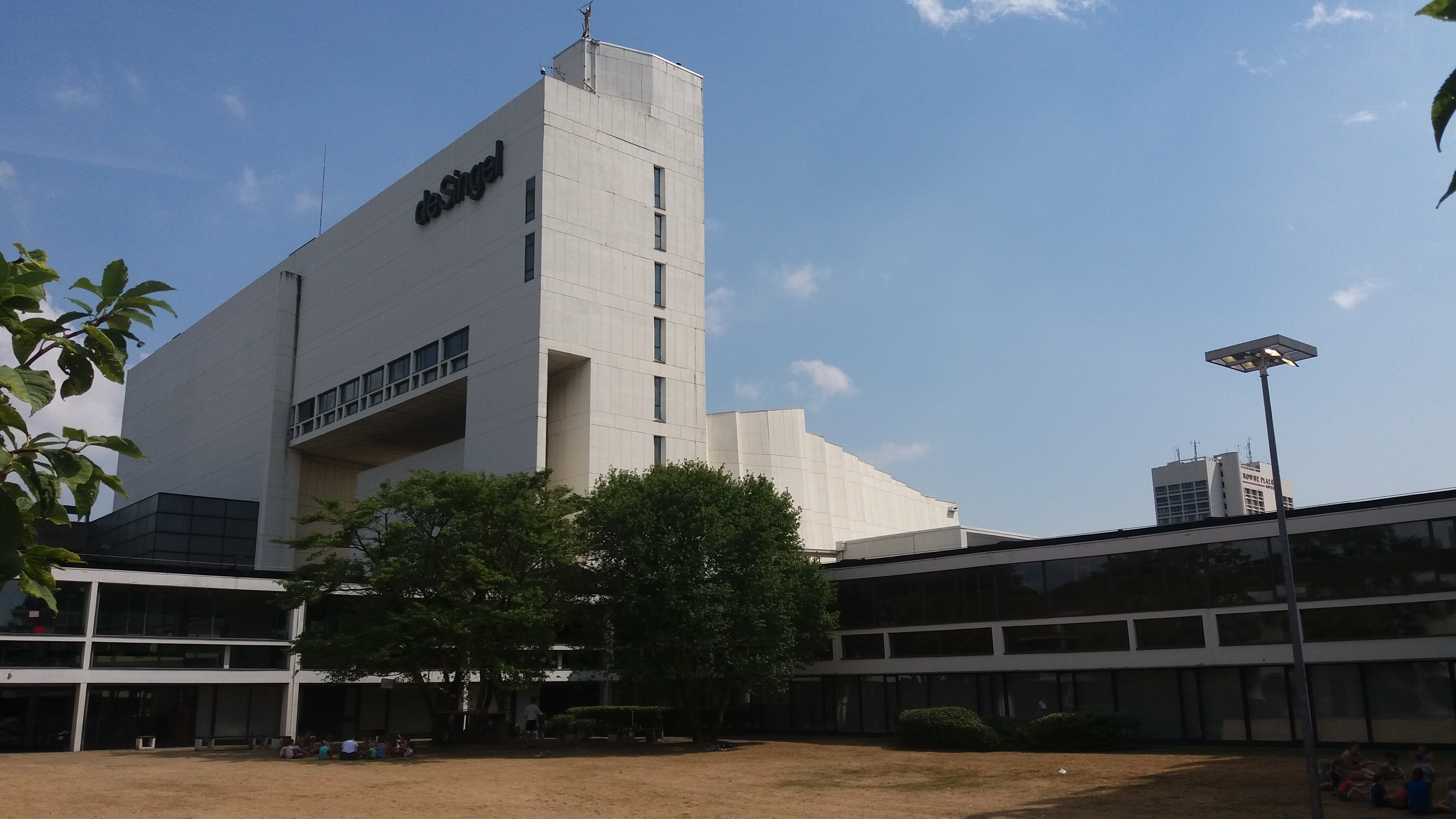
DeSingel in Antwerp

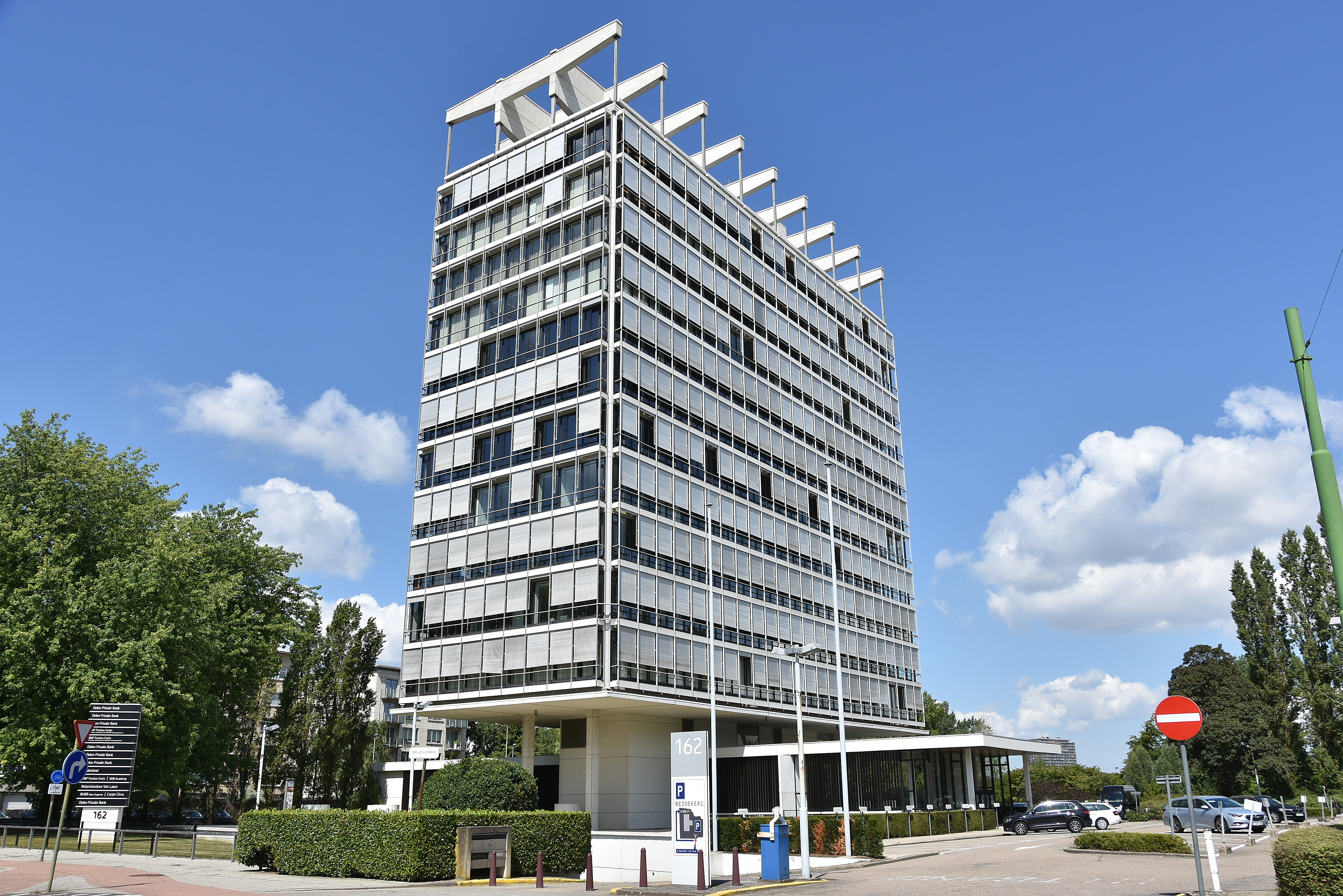
Léon Stynen BP-building Antwerp

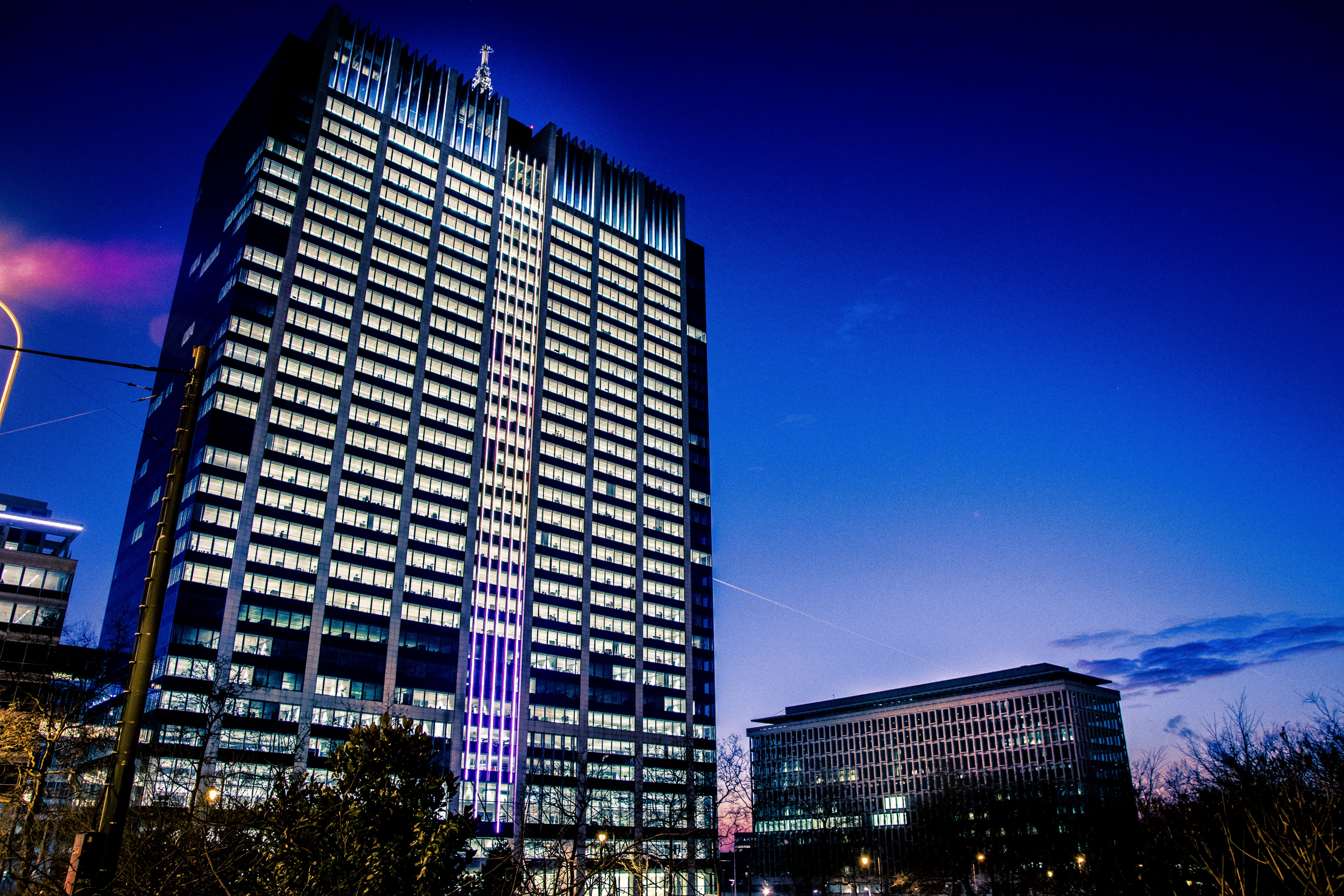
Finance Tower in Brussels

== Books about Leon Stynen ==
- Laureys, Dirk (2018). Léon Stynen [A Life of Architecture (1899-1990)] (in German). Antwerp, Belgium: Vlaams Architectuurinstituut. ISBN 978-9492567116.
