= Belgian Building =

Historic building in Virginia, US

- U.S. National Register of Historic Places
- Virginia Landmarks Register
- Richmond City Historic District
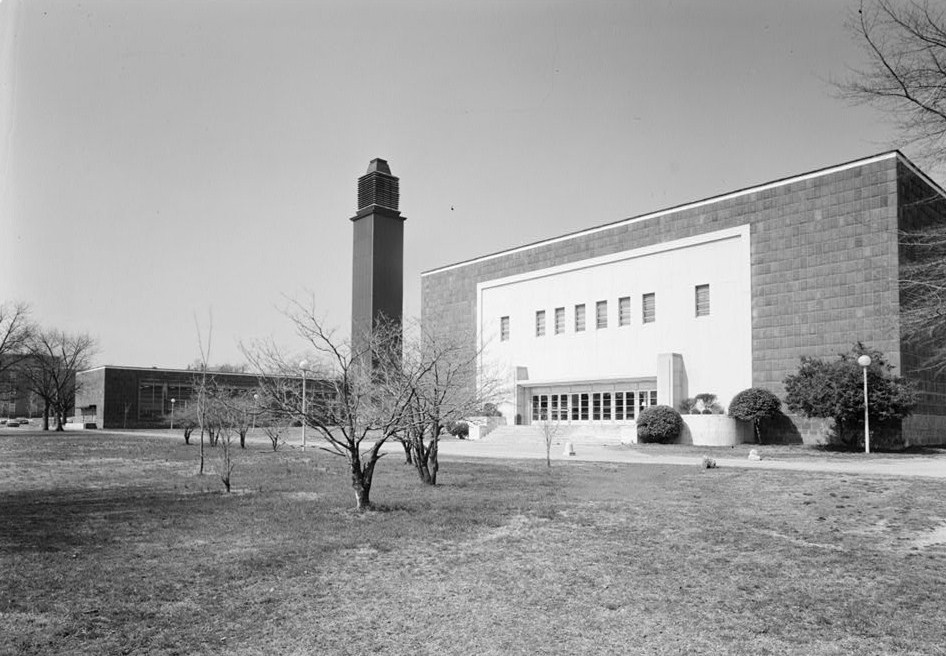

- Location within Virginia Location within the United States
- Location: Lombardy St., jct. with Brook Rd., Richmond, Virginia
- Coordinates: 37°33′45.4″N 77°26′59.5″W
- Built: 1939
- Architect: Victor Bourgeois, Léon Stynen
- Architectural style: International Style
- NRHP reference No.: 01000439
- VLR No.: 127-0173

Significant dates
- Added to NRHP: February 26, 1970
- Designated VLR: December 2, 1969

The Belgian Building, also known as the Belgian Friendship Building and Belgian Pavilion, is a historic building complex located in Richmond, Virginia, United States. It was originally constructed as the exhibition hall for the nation of Belgium at the 1939 New York World's Fair in New York City. One of the few buildings constructed for the fair that was designed to last beyond the event's end, the complex was initially intended to be reconstructed in Belgium following the conclusion of the fair. Due to Belgium's occupation by Nazi Germany during World War II, however, the building was instead donated to the Virginia Union University in Richmond. The facility was deconstructed in New York, shipped to Virginia, and reassembled on Virginia Union's campus. The complex served first as a new soldier processing location for the United States Army, then later as a gym, library, and classroom space for Virginia Union. The gym portion of the complex was renamed Barco-Stevens Hall, and as of 2026, still hosted collegiate athletic events. The building was listed on the National Register of Historic Places in 1970.

== Architecture ==
The Belgian Building was designed by Belgian architects Victor Bourgeois and Leon Stynen with Henry van de Velde directing the project. It was done in the International Style and was intentionally constructed entirely of materials of Belgian origin in a symbolic gesture of the exhibition's home. The red tiles and black slate that comprise the structure's exterior were sourced from Flanders and the Ardennes, respectively, and the plate glass that features prominently at the site came from the Walloon Region.

The facility was one of the few built for the world's fair that was intended to exist beyond that event's completion. It covers approximately 100,000 square feet (9,300 m^{2}) and was constructed in an irregular U-shape. Large spaces occupy opposite ends of the U with a smaller partitioned section connecting the two. A 161-foot-tall (49 m) tower rises over the southwest corner of the building. The tower's base features two Art Deco bas relief panels representing the culture of the Belgian Congo. A third panel elsewhere on the building's exterior depicts Belgian trade.

== History ==
The Belgian Building's existence began in Belgium itself, where the structure was originally constructed before being taken apart and shipped to the United States in advance of its construction for the 1939 New York World's Fair. The Belgian ambassador to the United States laid the structure's cornerstone at Flushing Meadows–Corona Park in 1938.

The pavilion opened at the fair in May 1939. Former president Herbert Hoover was the guest of honor at the opening night dinner, and was praised for his humanitarian efforts in Belgium during the First World War. The exhibition made headlines in June 1940 when the building lost power during a display of $2,000,000 worth of precious gems. The women modelling the jewels – guarded by heavily armed security – were rushed to a secure area until the lights came back on 45 minutes later. In May 1940, the pavilion closed abruptly, which was likely a result of the German invasion of Belgium earlier that month. It reopened days later but without the previously displayed bust of King Leopold III, which was ordered removed from the exhibition by the Belgian government following the king's capitulation to Germany.

The king's surrender prevented the building's planned return to Belgium following the conclusion of the fair. The Belgian government in exile sponsored a competition to determine the building's new home. Virginia Union University, a historically Black institution in Richmond, Virginia, ultimately won the prize due largely to both its need for the facility as well as having a suitable location to place it. The gift of the $700,000 building still required significant fundraising by the school, as the process of disassembly in New York, transport, and reconstruction in Richmond was expected to cost $800,000. The move was overseen by the Belgian architect Dr. Hugo Van Kuyck, and the African American architect Charles Thaddeus Russell supervised the reconstruction of the building on the Virginia Union grounds. The same group of Belgian contractors who erected the building in New York went to Virginia to execute the task there.

The Belgian Friendship Building was chosen as the facility's name once on the Virginia Union campus. It was eventually rebuilt largely as it appeared in New York and adapted to the university's needs, though fund shortages necessitated the complex to be constructed in phases. The auditorium portion of the facility was converted to a gym, while the opposite end became a library with a 94,000 volume capacity. The connecting portion of the structure became science-related classrooms and laboratories.

The tower, located on the southwest corner of the structure, was named after Robert Lee Vann, a Pittsburgh-area publisher and alum of Virginia Union. Originally a music tower, it held a 35-bell carillon during its time at the fair. However, those bells were donated by the Belgian government in 1941 to former president Hoover, who in turn gave them to his alma mater Stanford University. The carillon was augmented by a 2022 addition of 13 more bells and as of 2022 was operational in Stanford's Hoover Tower. In 2004, a fundraising effort began with the goal of acquiring new bells for the Belgian Building tower. Three years later, it was announced that the Belgian government had offered to purchase and donate a set of four bells from The Verdin Company.

During the building's gradual reconstruction on the Virginia Union campus in the 1940s, it served as a processing station for the United States Army. Roughly 160,000 soldiers passed through the facility by 1947. The bas reliefs carved into the tower proved controversial around this time; some felt the depiction of the Belgian Congo glorified colonialism, and concerns about the figures' nudity resulted in shrubs being planted to shield the art from the street.

The Belgian Building was listed on the National Register of Historic Places in 1970. In 1994, the building's tower underwent a $300,000 restoration. It was repaired again after suffering damage from Hurricane Isabel in 2003. Following Virginia Union's late 1990s construction of a separate library facility named for former student and later Virginia governor Douglas Wilder, the previous library space in the Belgian Building was occupied by the school's music and arts programs. In 2019, Virginia Union received a $500,000 grant to assist in renovations and repairs to the building. The gym, by then known as Barco-Stevens Hall, received improvements that included an upgraded HVAC system. While there had been plans to build a dedicated athletic center for the school, as of 2022, the renovated facility still hosted the school's collegiate basketball games.

== Gallery ==
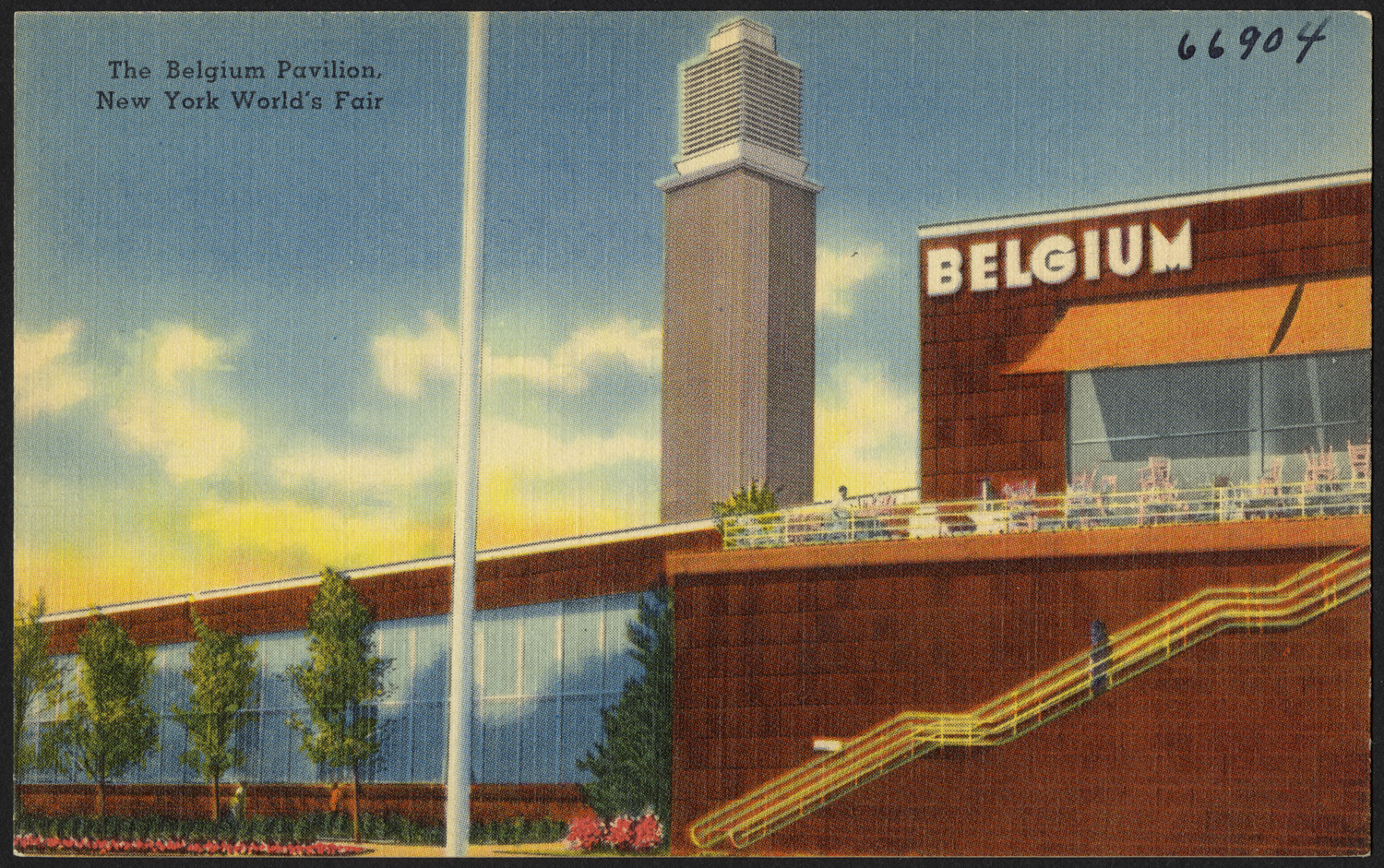

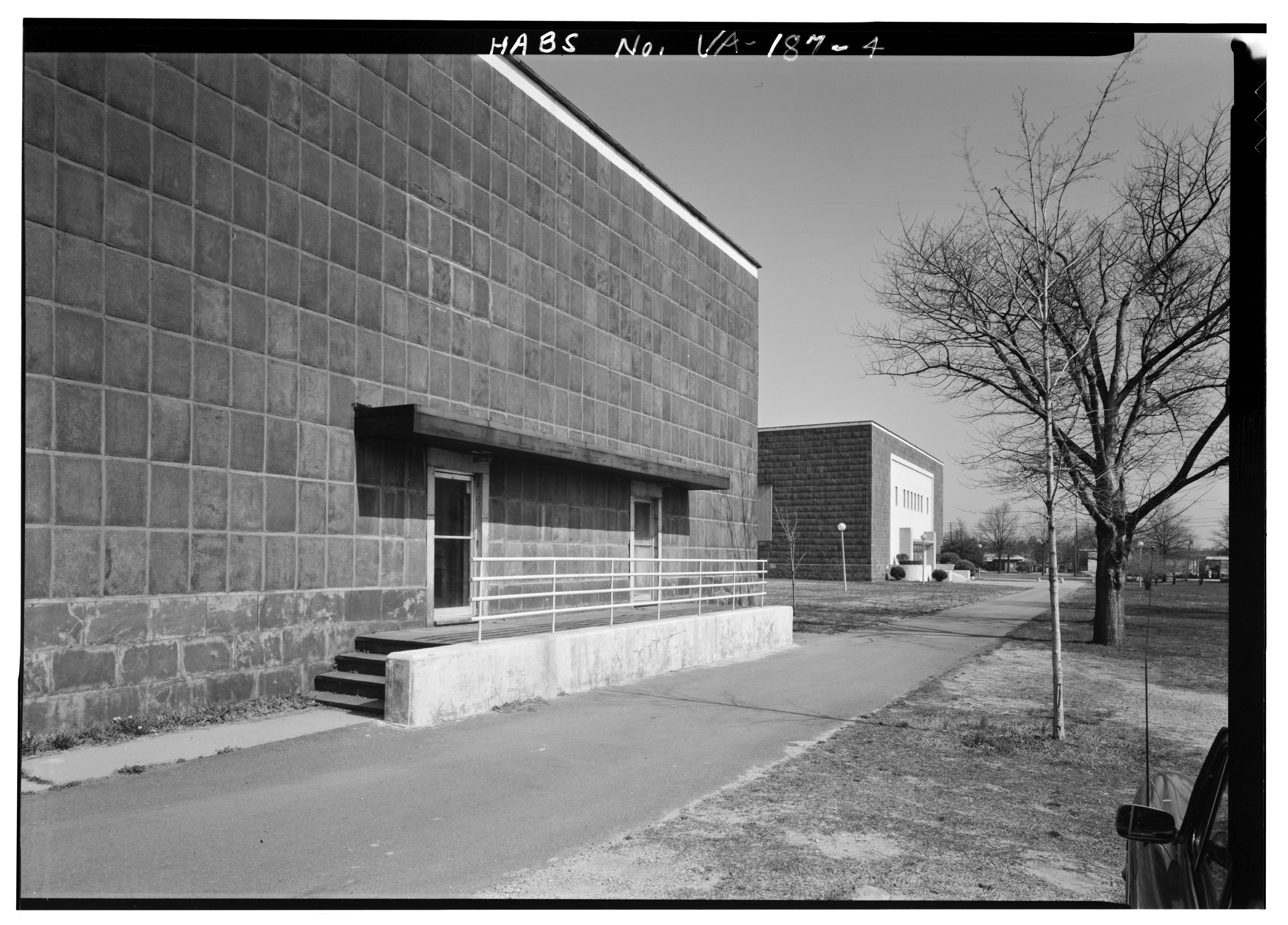

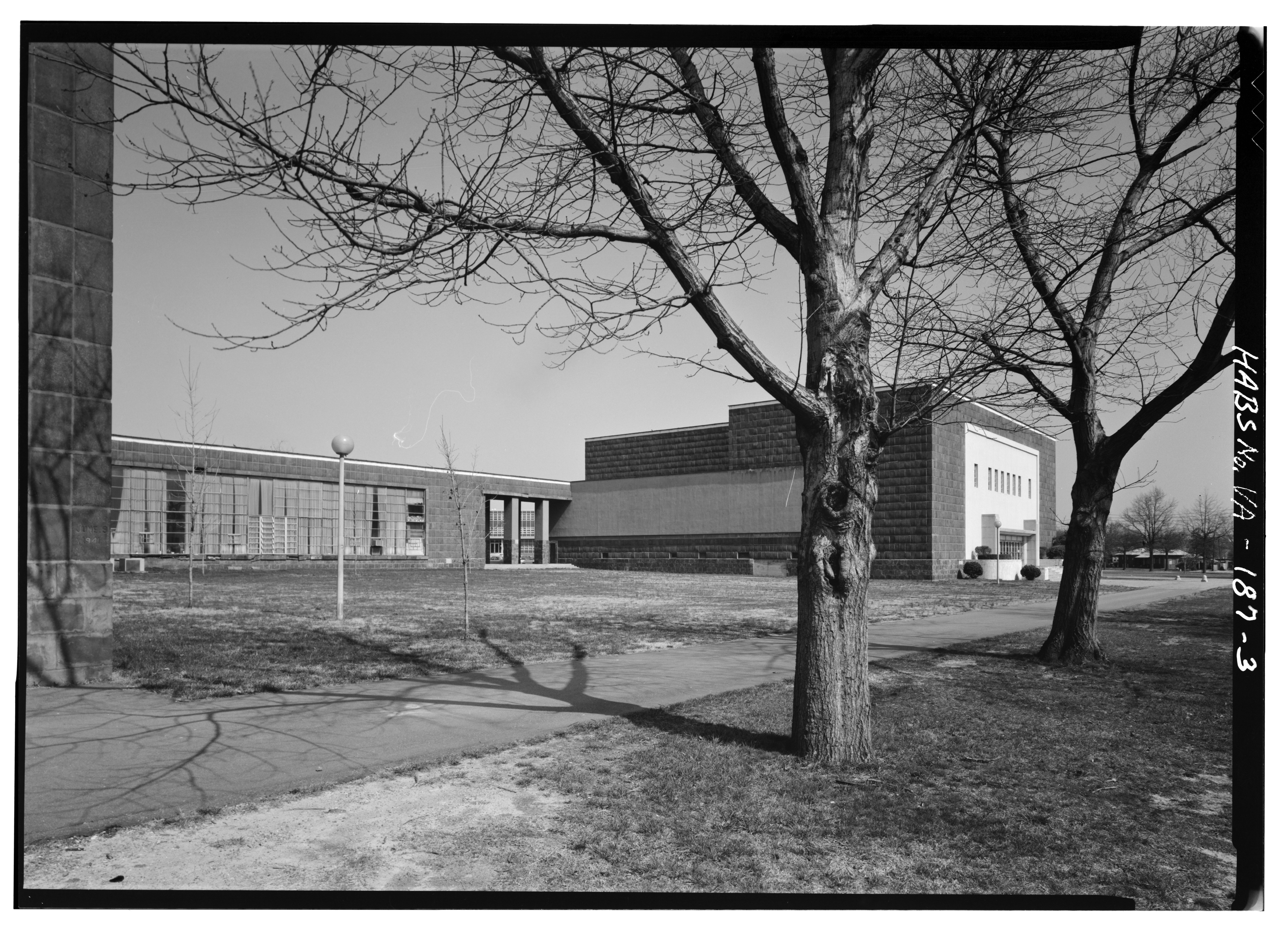

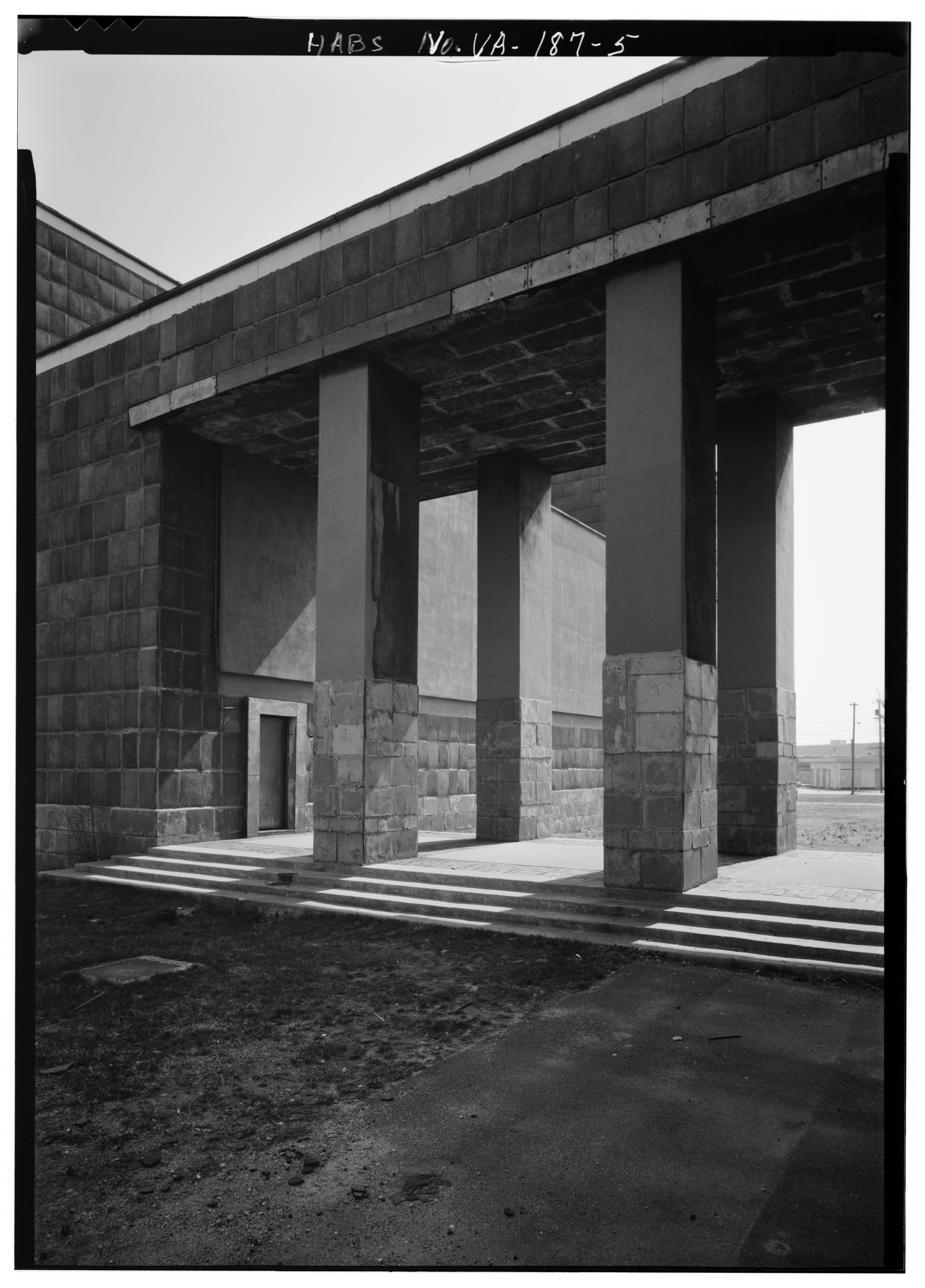

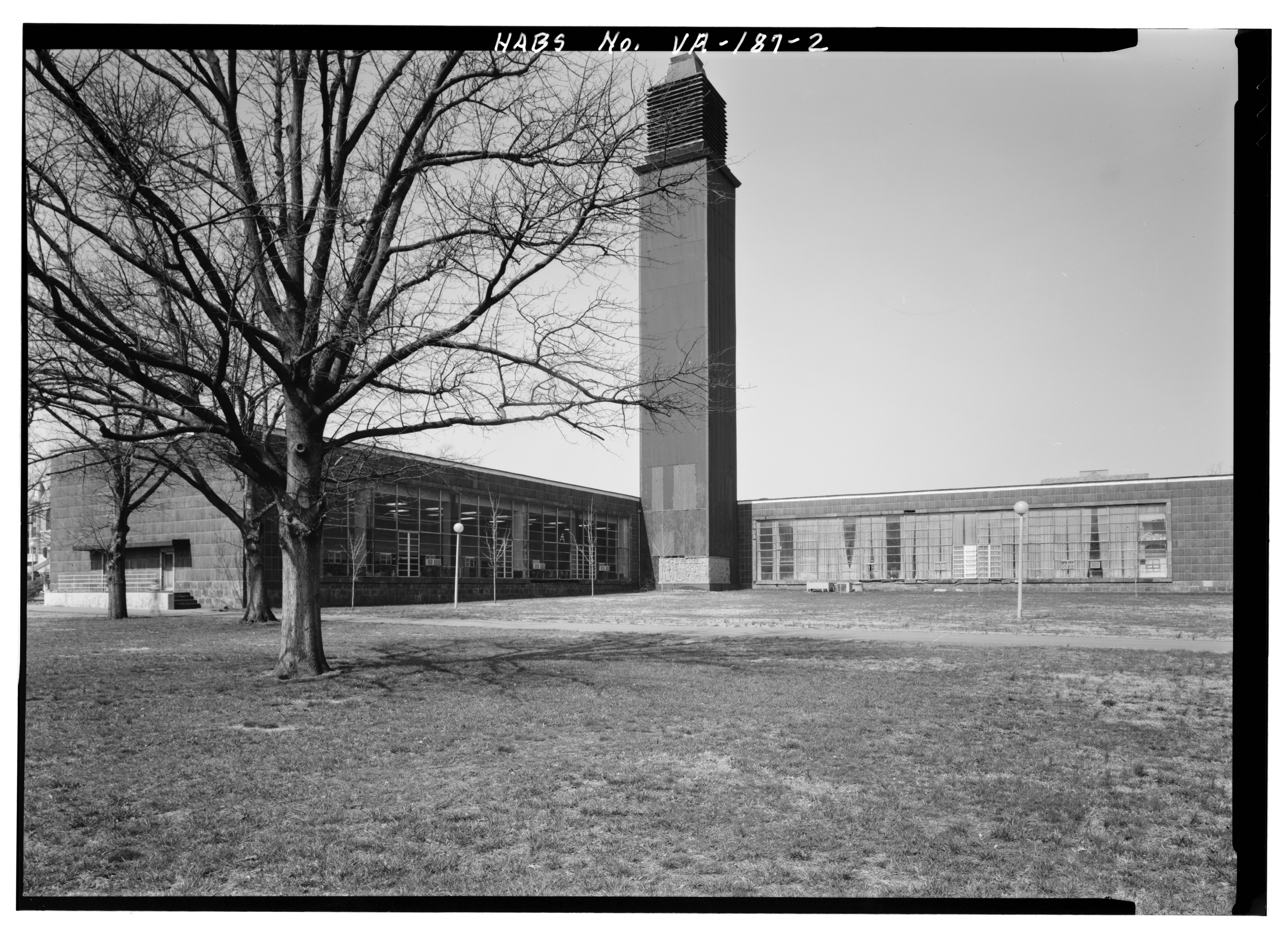

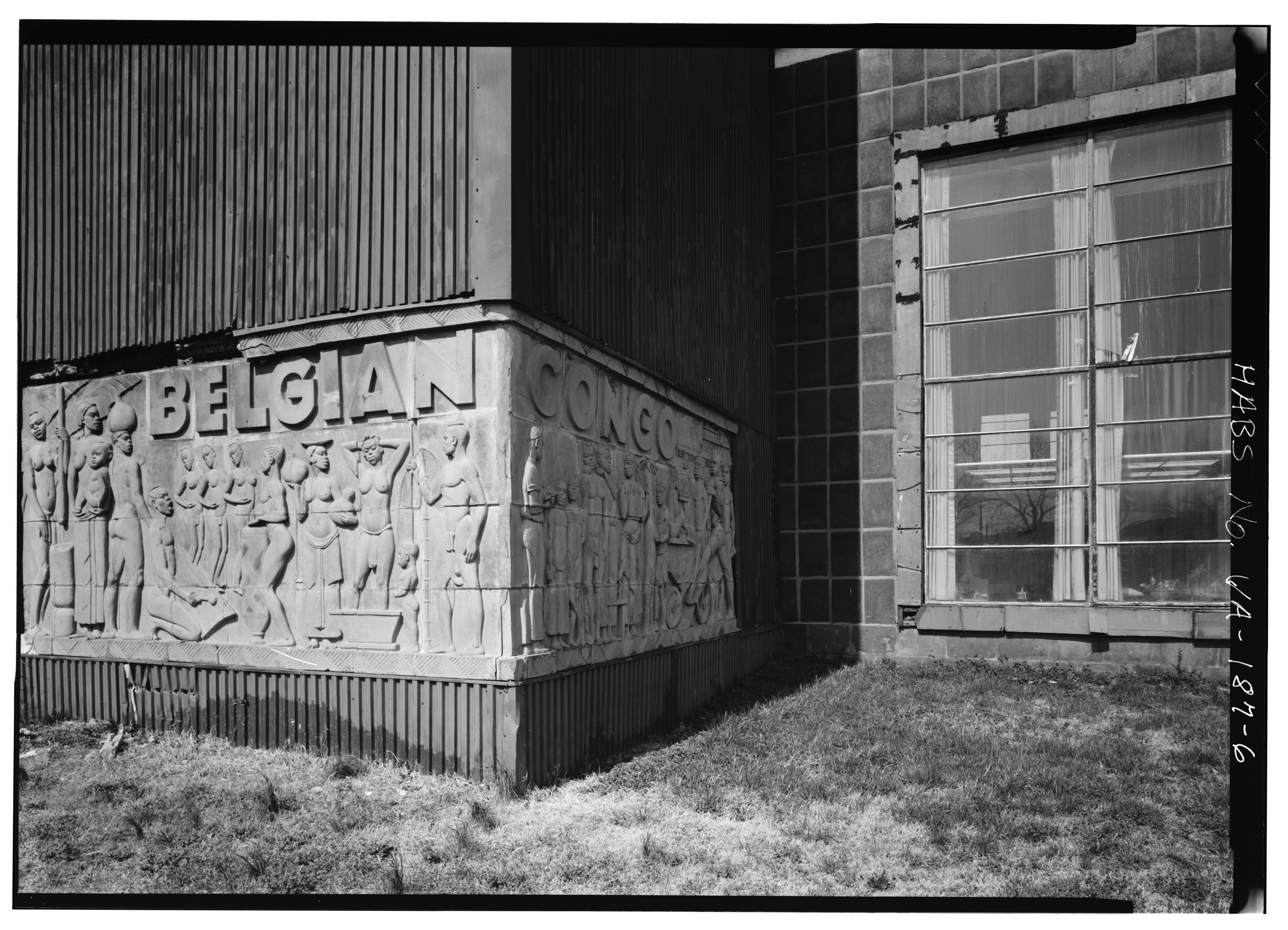

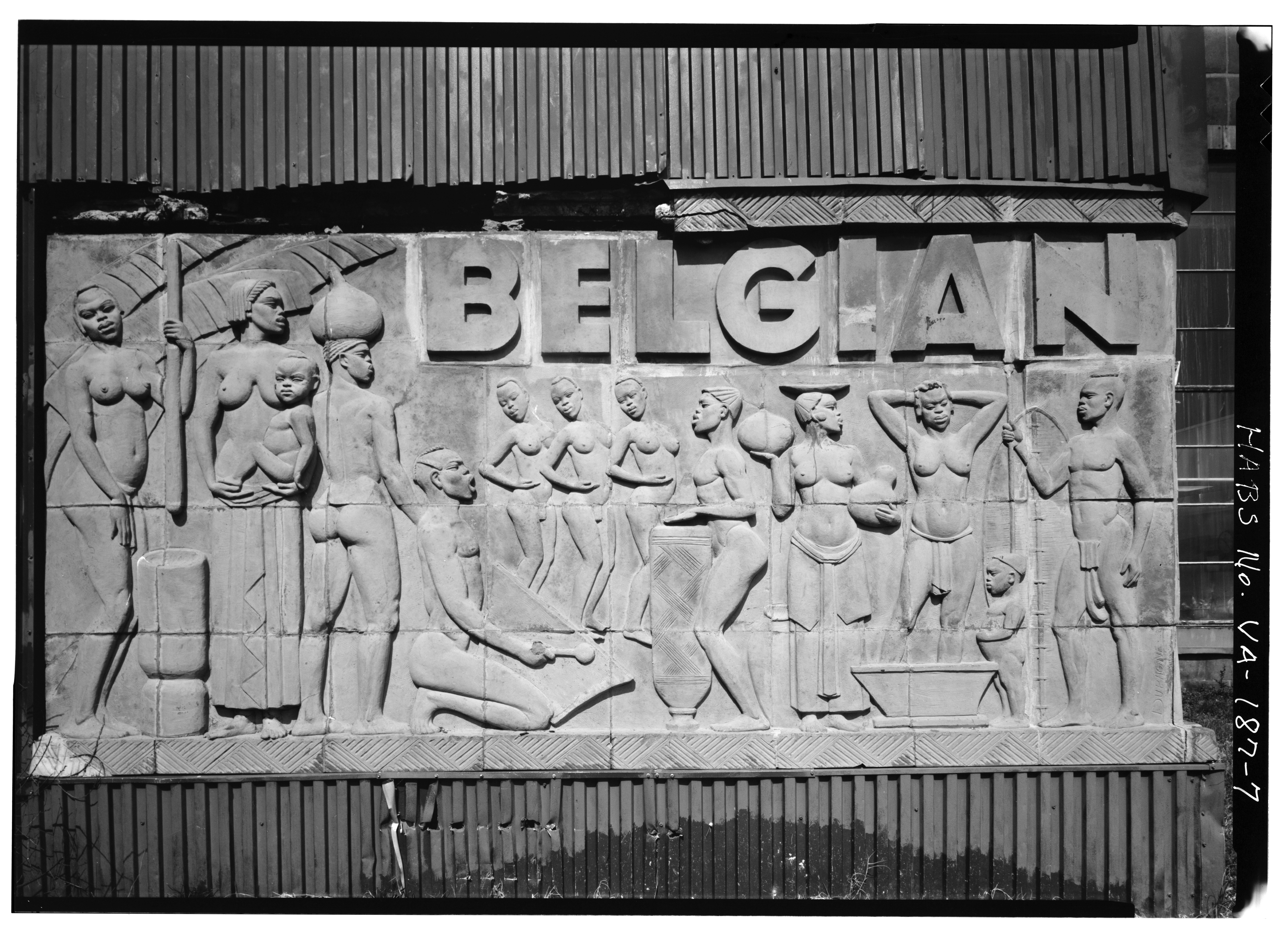

== See also ==
- 1939 New York World's Fair pavilions and attractions
- National Register of Historic Places in Richmond, Virginia
