= BP Building (Antwerp) =

Office building in Antwerp, Belgium

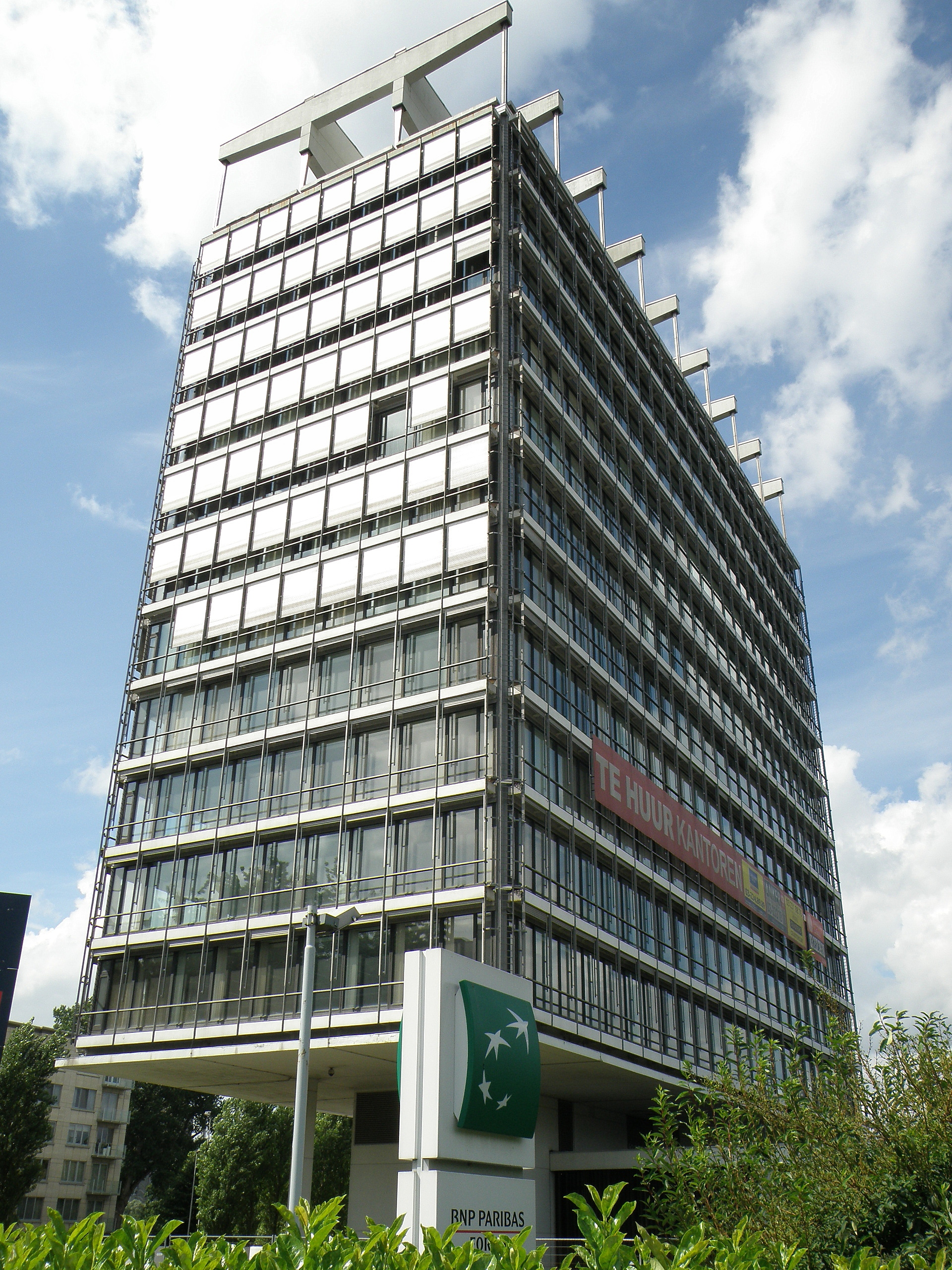
- BP Building in 2012
- Interactive map of the BP Building area
- Former names: Axa-Royale Belge Tower

General information
- Status: Completed
- Type: Office
- Architectural style: Modernism
- Location: Antwerp, Belgium, Jan van Rijswijcklaan 162
- Coordinates: 51.1925°N 4.3975°E
- Current tenants: Delen Private Bank; BNP Paribas Wealth Management; Notariskantoor Van Laere; Waterland Private Equity
- Construction started: 1960
- Completed: 1963
- Owner: Buysse & Partners Smart Assets

Height
- Height: 187 feet (57 m)

Technical details
- Structural system: Cables and beams
- Material: Concrete
- Floor count: 12

Design and construction
- Architect: Léon Stynen
- Other designers: Claude Blondel and Raymond Van Loo
- Main contractor: Algemene Ondernemingen Widuwe Jerôme Van Coillie

The BP Building, previously also known as the Axa-Royale Belge Tower, is a suspended-structure office building in Antwerp, Belgium, designed by the Belgian architect Léon Stynen. The building was completed in 1963 and features a unique cantilevered floor structure and cable supports. All of the floors are supported with external cables that are attached to roof beams: the weight of roof beams, all floors, and the external walls are carried by a center core. The building was commissioned by BP and is still referred to as the "BP Building", but is now owned by Buysse & Partners Smart Assets since 2018. Its architecture has been classified as Modernist and Brutalist.

== Design ==
In 1963, well-known Belgian architect Leon Stynen experimented with a technique which allowed a cantilevered facade. All of the floors and the facade of the building are held up with steel cables which are supported from rooftop beams. The design allows for a greater unobstructed interior space. It was Europe's first building which made use of "suspended construction".

The floors are supported by external cables, which allows each floor to have no internal columns. The ten floors are all similar and divided by interior wood-based walls. The facade is a type of curtain wall with metal grids. A restaurant is located on the upper level of the building.

The center concrete columns are 57 metres (187 ft) tall, and in addition to supporting the stairway and the duct work, they also support the steel core of two 55-metre (180 ft) beams. Nine crossbeams, 18 metres (59 ft) long, run perpendicular to the two primary beams. Cables are then hung from the crossbeams, and these support the floors.

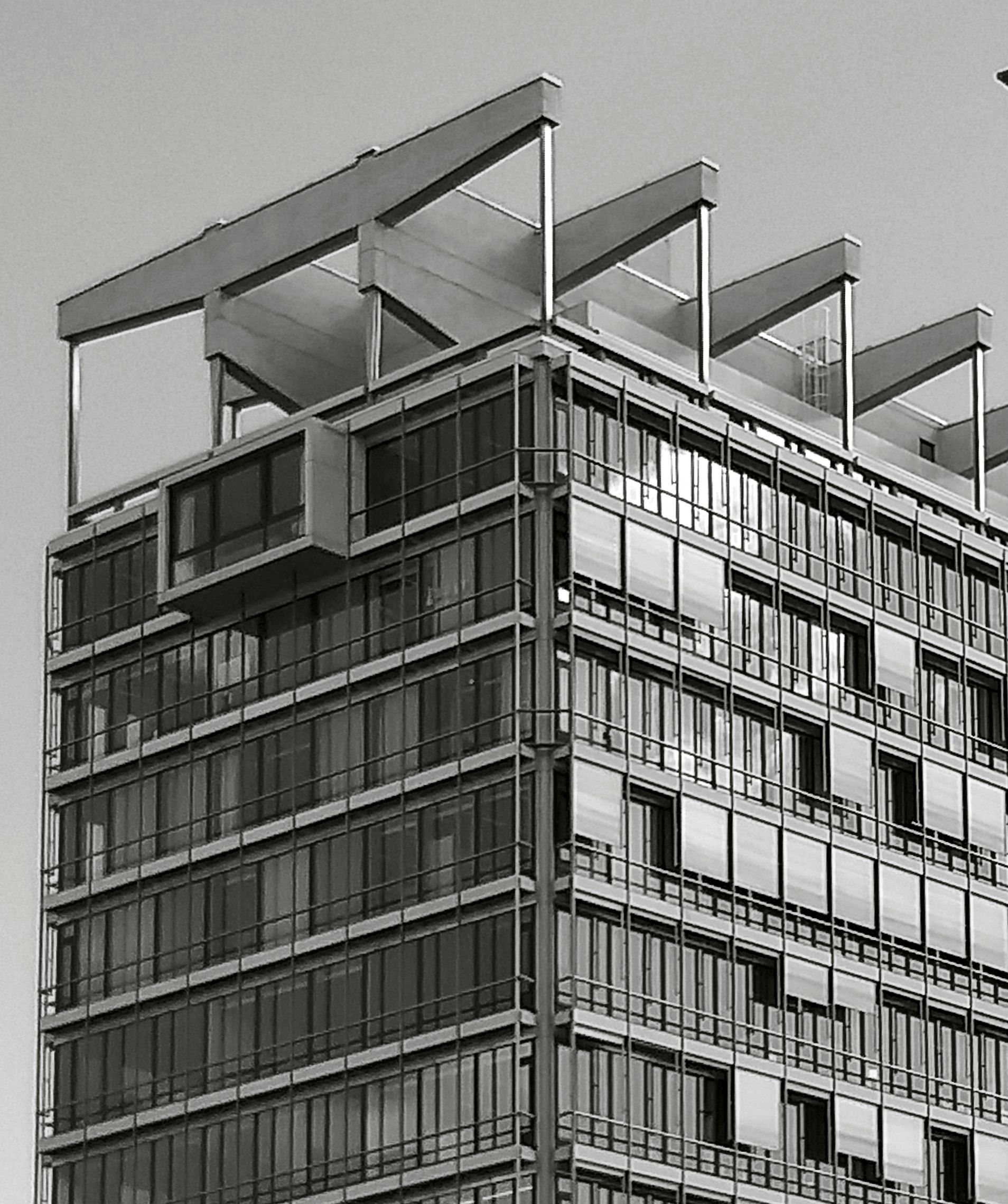
Top section of the BP Building, showing cantilevered roof beams and suspension cables

== Axa-Royale Belge Tower ==
The building was purchased by Axa Bank Belgium and renamed the Axa-Royale Belge Tower. It underwent a major renovation and most of the original interior is now replaced.

On 5 March 2001 the building was classified as an architectural monument based on historical and architectural value.

== Awards ==
1964 SBUAM Prize Société belge des Urbanistes et Architectes modernistes.
