= Suspended structure =

Suspended structure architecture

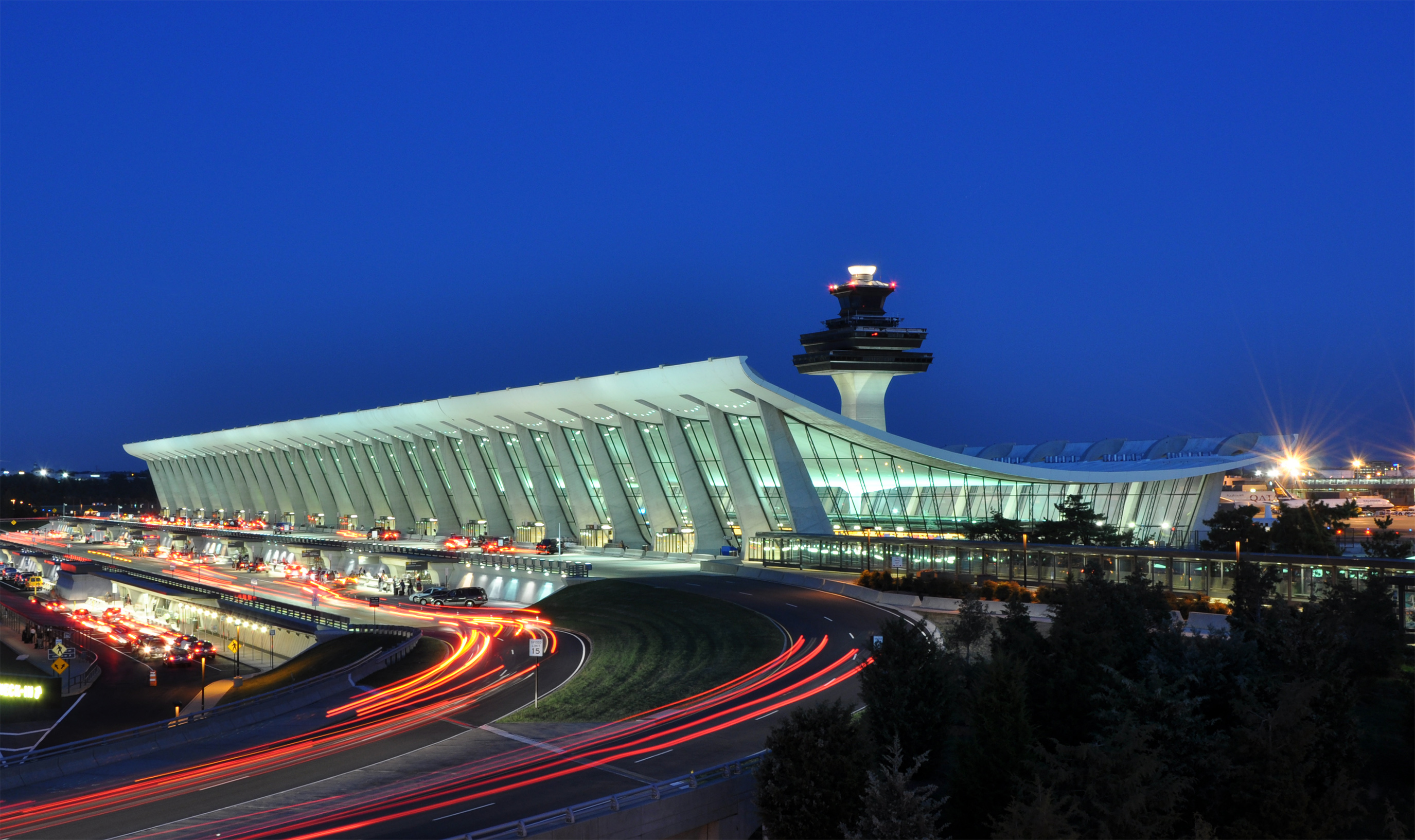
The Dulles International Airport Main Terminal is an example of a catenary suspended structure.

A suspended structure is a structure which is supported by cables coming from beams or trusses which sit atop a concrete center column or core. The design allows the walls, roof and cantilevered floors to be supported entirely by cables and a center column.

Another type of suspended structure, suspended catenary, uses outer-wall concrete columns angled away from the center with a cable system strung between them suspending a roof and outer wall structure. In this example there are no supports or visual obstructions inside the structure.

== Background ==
Some of the first suspension structures were bridges. The first iron chain suspension bridge in the Western world was the Jacob's Creek Bridge (1801) in Westmoreland County, Pennsylvania, designed by inventor James Finley. The Golden Gate Bridge in San Francisco, California, is another example of a suspension structure. Much like the suspended building structure, towers hold the weight and cables support the bridge deck. In the case of suspension bridges, there is "tensional force" transferred to the columns.

== Design ==
Minimal interior visual obstruction is a feature of all suspended structure buildings. The architectural method creates a visually striking open space in the interior of the structure. The load for the suspended structure is either a suspended catenary or is supported by truss-work carrying the weight of the building through a building core.

== Engineering ==
Suspended structures of the center column type utilize high-strength cable to suspend or support the floors. In some cases beams are cantilevered out from the concrete column at the center of the building. From the top of the center column, cables are used to support the roof system and the walls. Cables run down from the top of the tower to support floors. The external skeleton of the structure is a type of curtain wall which also is supported by cables. Suspended structures often allow much light to enter, because of the unobstructed interior.

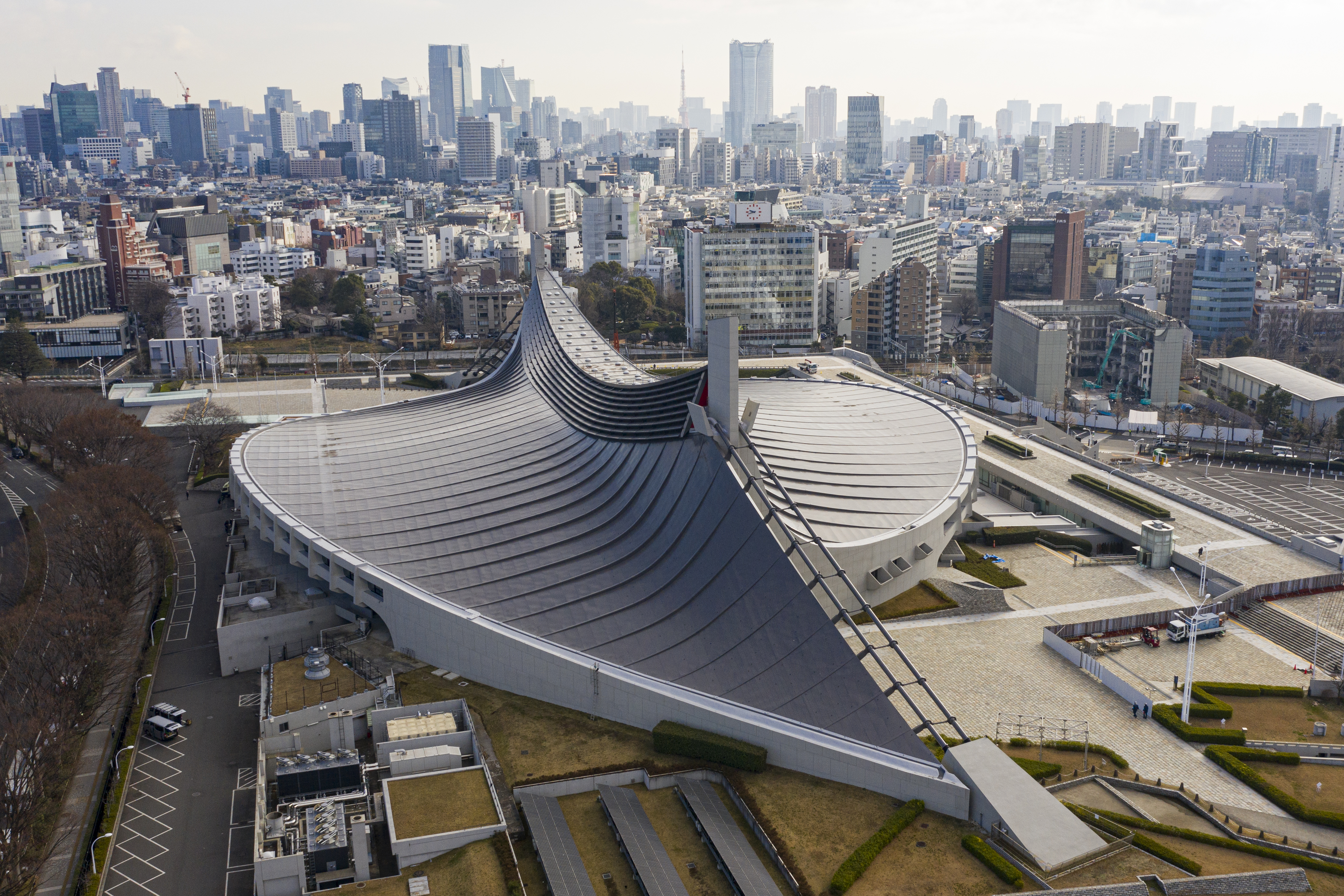
A cable suspended structure: Yoyogi National Gymnasium in Tokyo

An example of a catenary-shaped suspended structure is the Eero Saarinen designed Dulles International Airport Main Terminal. The roof of the structure is made up of suspension cable which stretches across angled concrete columns. In the design of Dulles airport, the floor, the columns and the roof all work together to allow the walls and ceiling to float. This leaves a large open space for the building.

The Yoyogi National Gymnasium in Tokyo is an example of a cable suspended structure. The roof system is a large span and the structure has been called "one of the most beautiful buildings in the 20th century", largely due to the suspended roof system.

== Examples of suspended structure buildings ==
- BP Building (Antwerp) (1963)
- HSBC Building (Hong Kong) (1985)
- Central Plaza (Dublin)
- Riverplace Tower (1966)
- Yoyogi National Gymnasium (1964)
- State Theatre (Hong Kong) (1952)
- Atrium Link (1997) and Atrium Link Extension (2009), Convention and Exhibition Centre, Hong Kong

== See also ==
- Catenary arch
- Tensile structure

== Gallery ==
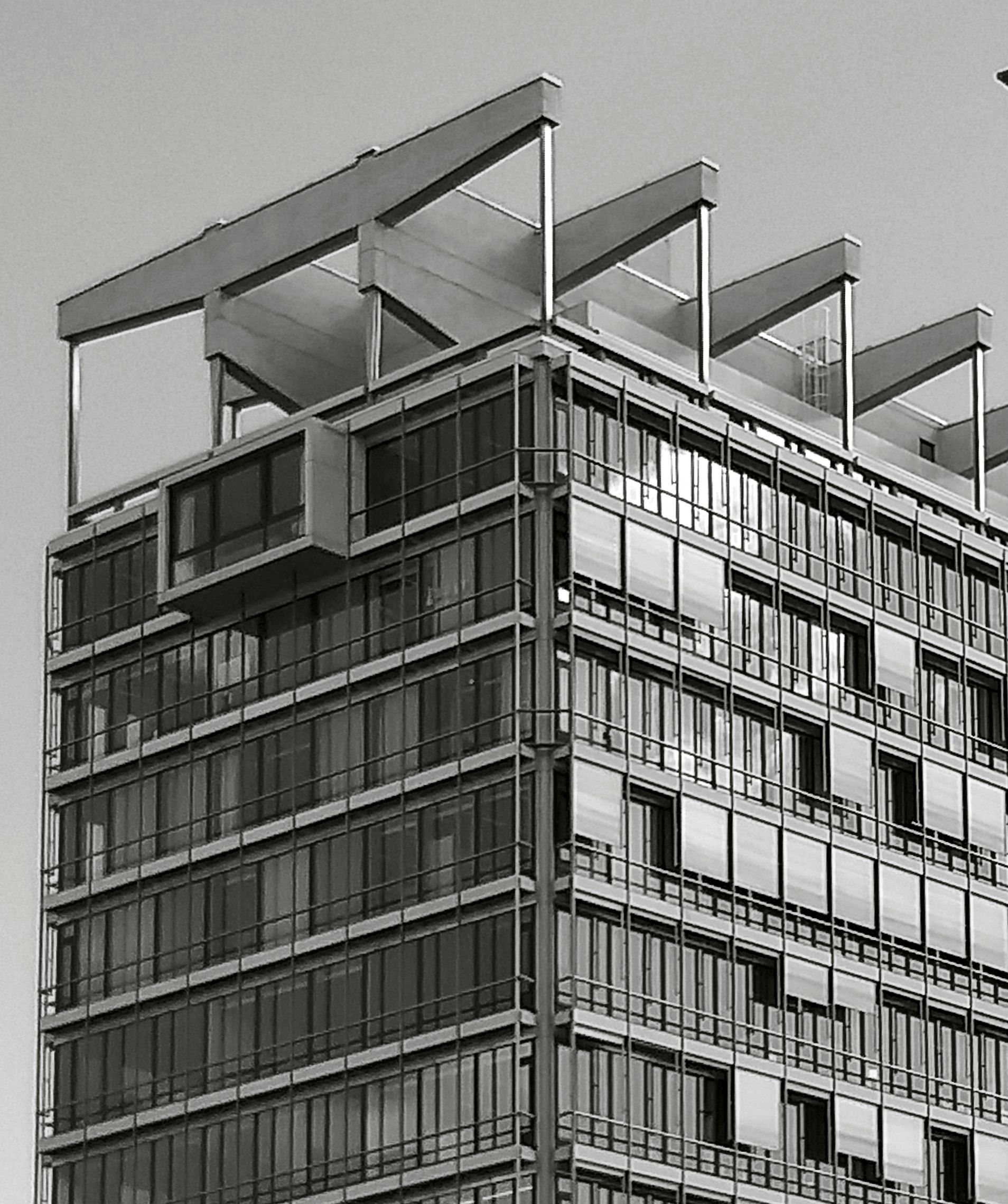
BP Building roof truss suspended structure

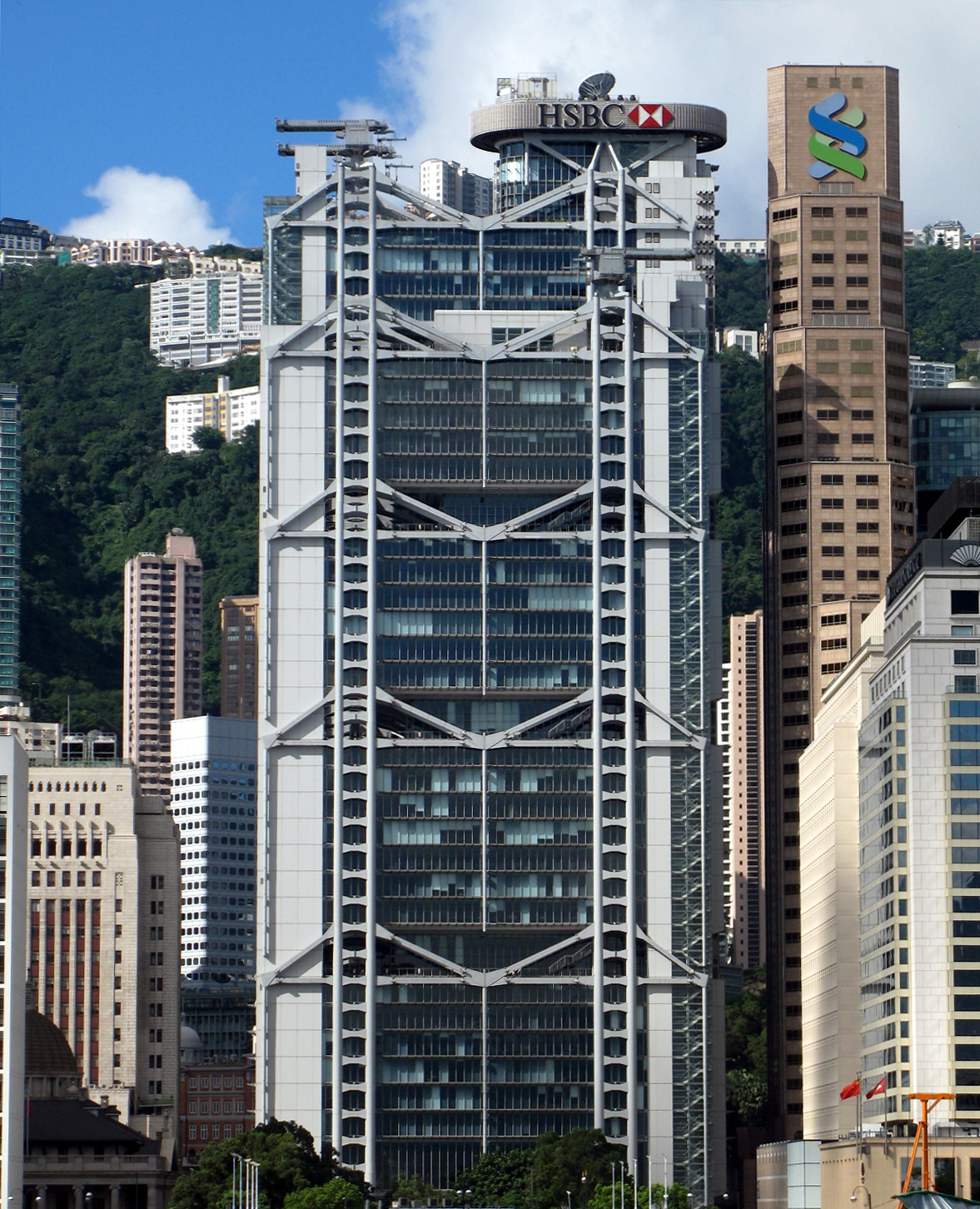
HSBC Building (Hong Kong) steel suspended structure

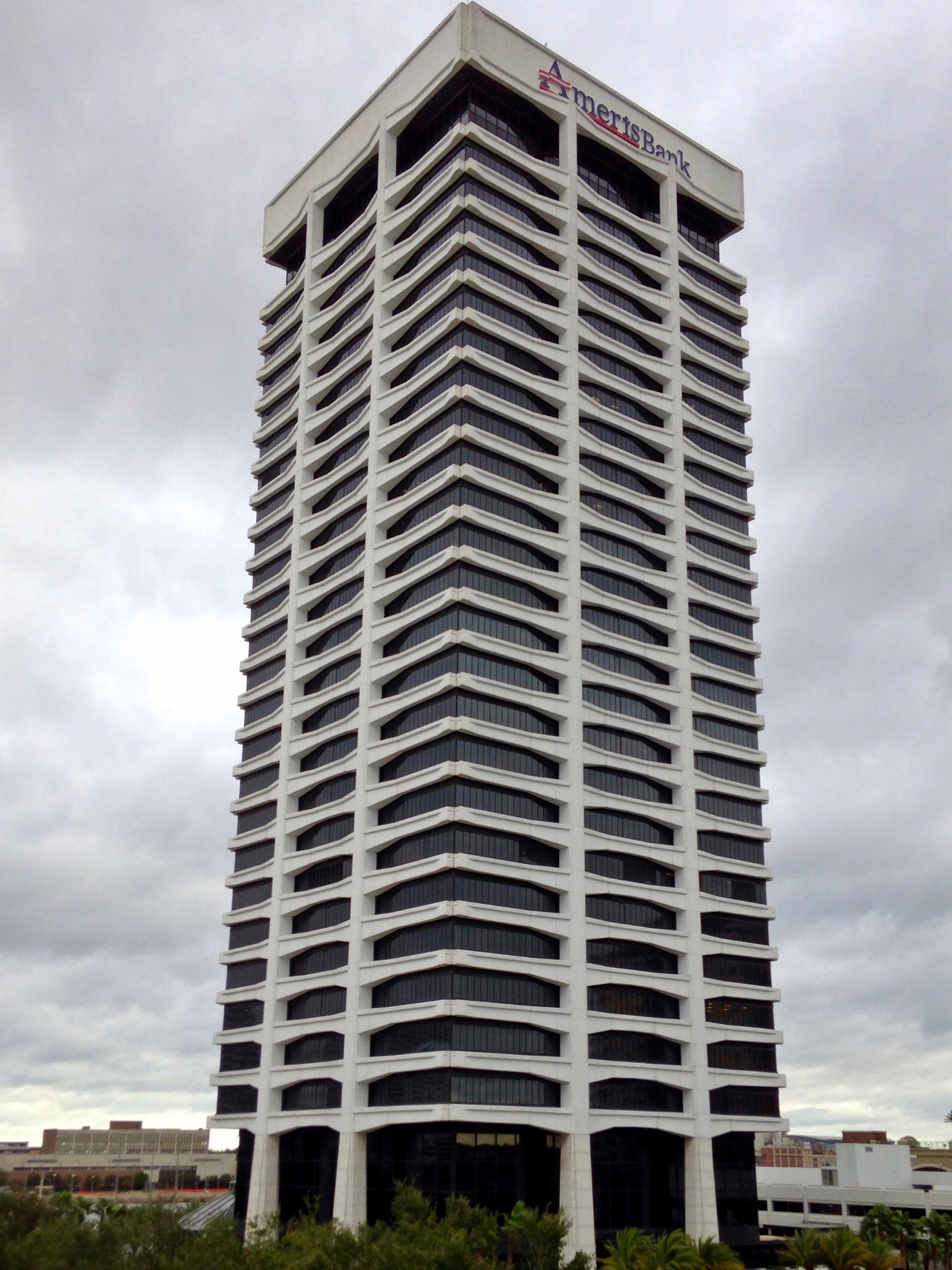
Riverplace Tower, Jacksonville, Florida: structural support from the central core and the external vertical beams.

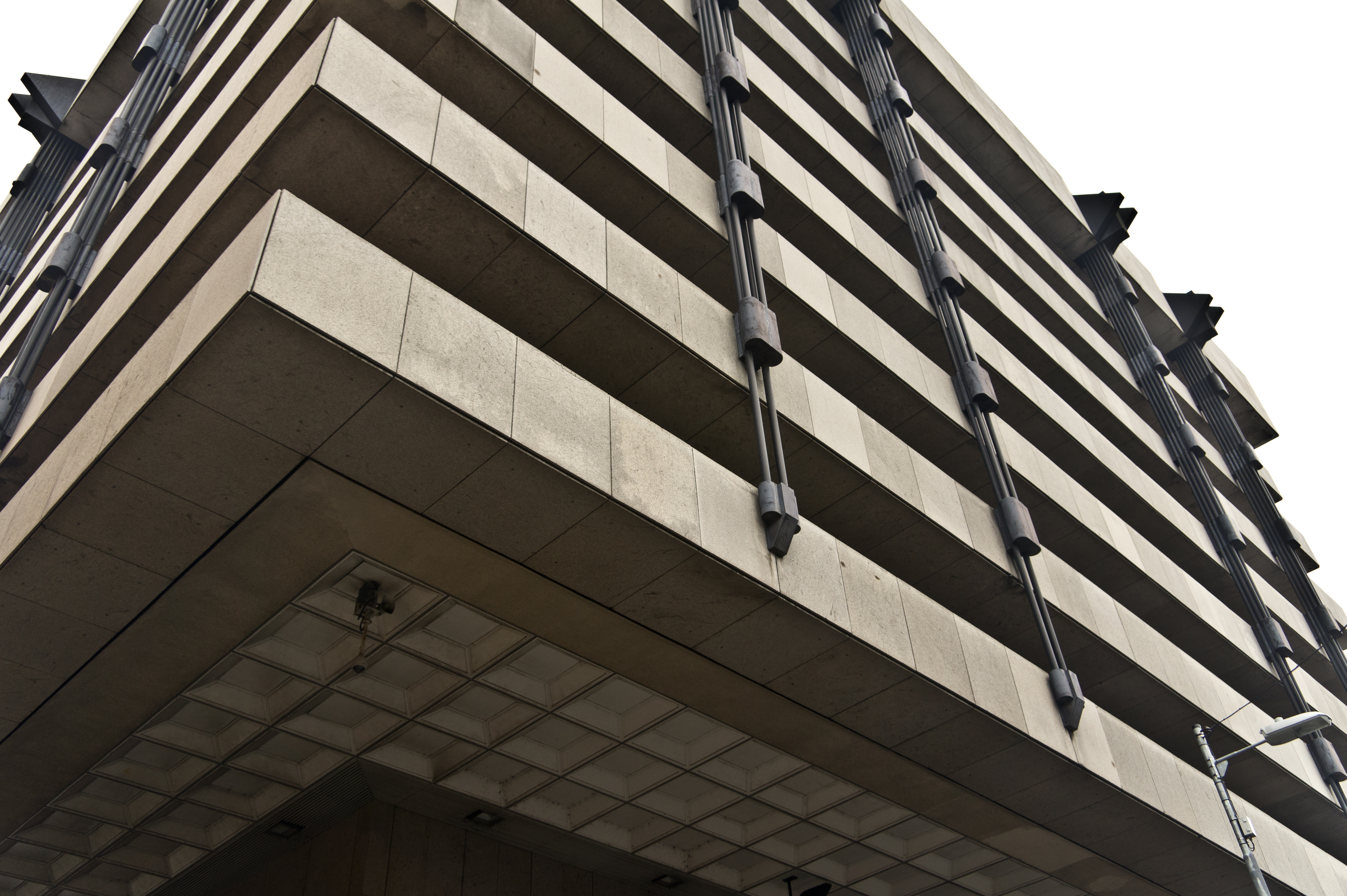
Central Plaza (Dublin) external support detail
