= Guillaume Dumont =

Belgian sculptor

- Born: 1889; Borgerhout, Belgium
- Died: Unknown
- Occupation: Sculptor

Guillaume Dumont (born 1889, date of death unknown) was a Belgian sculptor. His work was part of the sculpture event in the art competition at the 1928 Summer Olympics.

== Career ==
In 1921 he collaborated with the architect Leon Stynen to create a war memorial column (Herdenkingsmonument 1914–1918) in Knokke to commemorate the fallen of World War I. From a total of 16 designs submitted, Stynen's was the one accepted, and Stynen collaborated with Dumont to make the monument. There is a plaque affixed to the monument on which Dumont's name is misspelled "Dupont".

The memorial consists of four standing figures representing soldiers leaning against a central column. The sculpture was inaugurated on 11 June 1922.
