= Axa Bank Belgium =

Cooperative bank in Belgium

- Type: Bank
- Legal status: N.V. / S.A.
- Headquarters: AXA Bank Belgium
- Location: Troonplein / Place du Trone, 1 1000 Brussels - Belgium
- Key people: Jef Van In (president of the board of directors); Peter Devlies (chief executive officer and executive member of the board of directors)
- Website: www.axabank.be

Axa Bank Belgium was Axa Group’s banking arm in Belgium until its acquisition by Belgian Bank Crelan in 2019 and its incorporation into Crelan in 2025. Located in Antwerp, Axa Bank Belgium provided retail banking to individuals and small companies locally, and also cooperated with Axa’s local insurance company.

== History ==
In June 2007, Axa Group’s management board decided to adopt a common European banking strategy. This led to the creation of a European banking head-office in Brussels, Axa Bank Europe, using the former Axa Bank Belgium’s legal structure.

In 2008, Axa Life Europe Hedging Services joined AXA Bank Europe to provide financial engineering competencies to the insurance companies of the group and Axa Bank Europe.

In 2009, the Hungarian Ella Bank became a branch of AXA Bank Europe. The same year, a branch was launched in Switzerland and one year later, in the Czech Republic. Another branch was launched in Slovakia in 2011.

In 2014, a transformation plan was launched to re-focus on the Belgian retail market. Since summer 2015, all teams from Axa Bank Europe have been working from the former Anhyp building in Berchem, Antwerp (Grotesteenweg 214).

In June 2017, Axa Bank Europe changed its name back to Axa Bank Belgium.

In October 2019, the Axa Group sold Axa Bank Belgium to Crelan for €620 million (US$688.51 million).

On January 1 2021, activities in Switzerland were transferred to ZweiPlus Bank.

In Dec 2021, Axa closes the deal to sell the bank to Crelan and acquires the insurance firm.

== Governance ==
Axa Bank Belgium's strategic decisions are taken by its board of directors, headed by Jef Van In and managed through its management board, headed by Peter Devlies.

== Axa’s banking presence across Europe ==
=== Belgium ===
Axa Bank in Belgium offers banking products and services to retail and small business customers, serviced through a network of independent bank agents.

=== Hungary (past) ===
Axa Bank in Hungary focused on mortgage lending from July 2009. Products were marketed through nationwide mortgage centers, 300 tied insurance agents and over the Internet. Since January 1, 2012, Hungarian commercial activities had been put in run-off.

In February 2016, Axa announced that it had entered into an agreement with OTP Bank to sell its Hungarian banking operations.

=== France and Germany ===
Axa Group owns banking activities in France (Axa Banque France) and in Germany (Axa Bank AG). These two entities are not part of Axa Bank Belgium's legal structure, but have developed some operational links.

== See also ==
- Axa Group
- Axa-Royale Belge Tower
- List of banks in Belgium
