= Victor Bourgeois =

Belgian modernist architect (1897 - 1962)

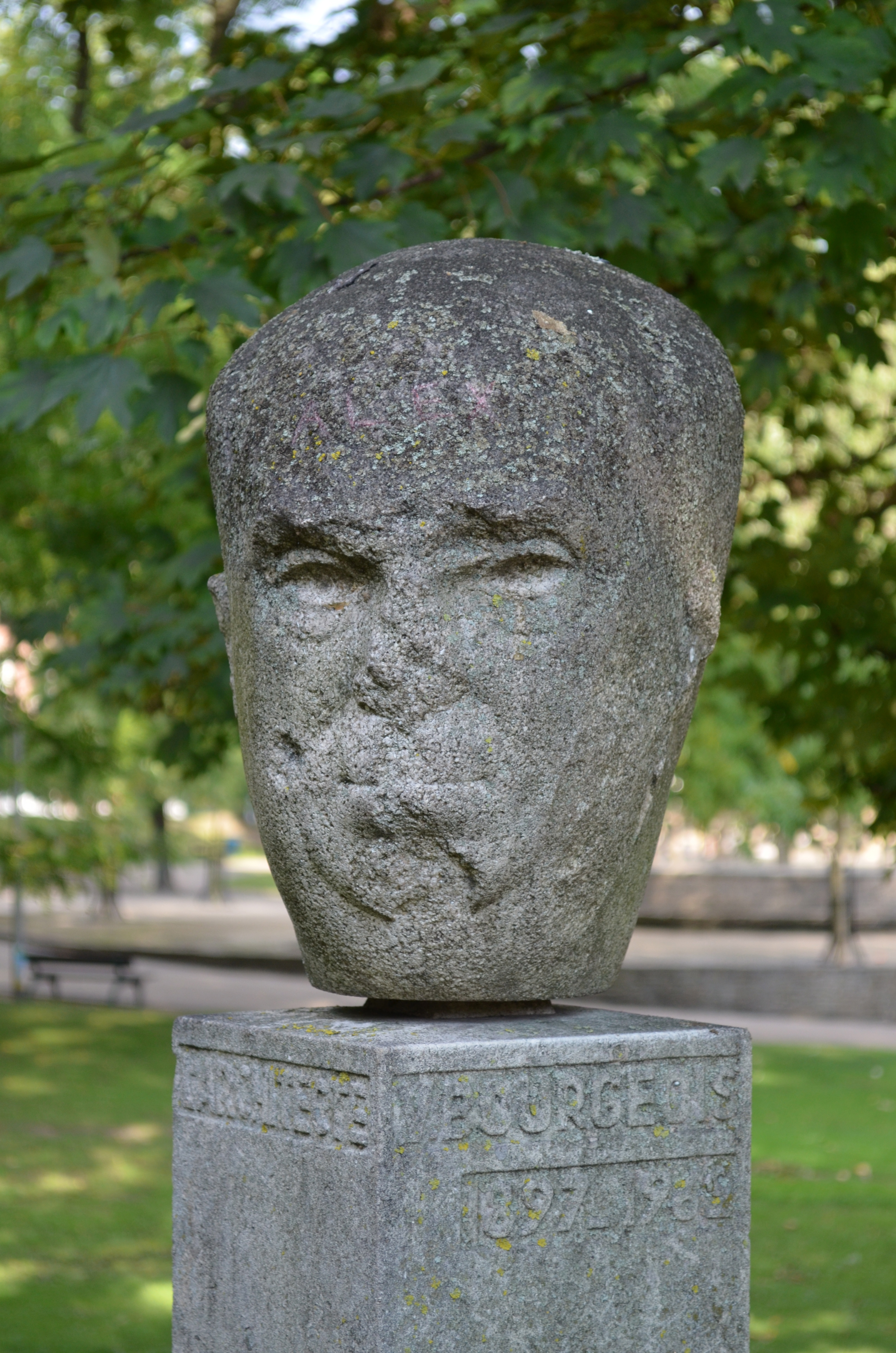
- Bust (vandalized) of Victor Bourgeois in Parc Astrid in Charleroi, work by Frans Lambrechts.
- Born: 28 August 1897; Charleroi
- Died: 24 July 1962 (aged 64)
- Occupations: architect, urban planner

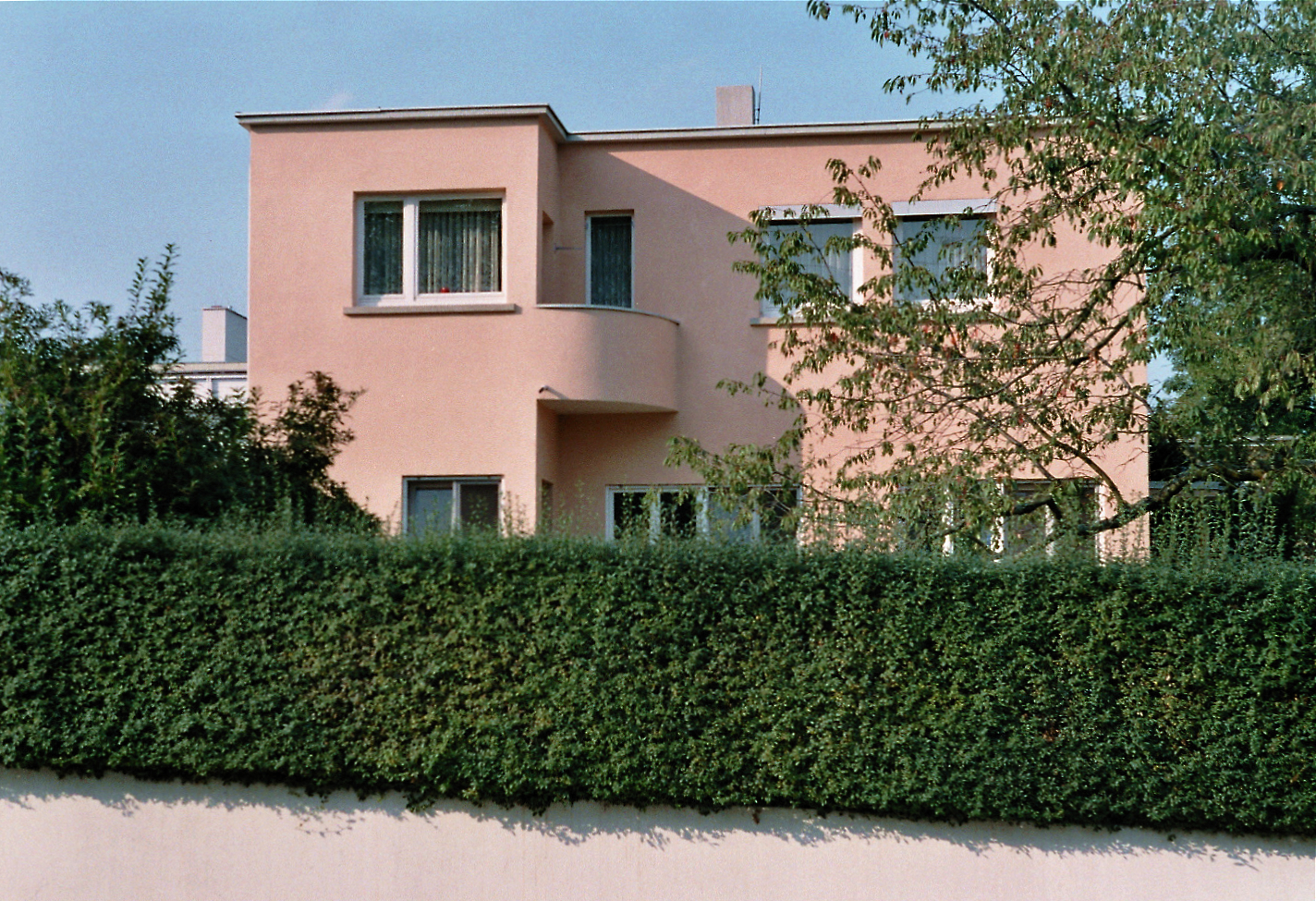
Bourgeois's house at the Weissenhof Estate

Victor Bourgeois (French pronunciation: [viktɔʁ buʁʒwa]; 29 August 1897 – 24 July 1962) was a Belgian architect and urban planner, considered the greatest Belgian modernist architect.

Bourgeois was born in Charleroi and studied at the Royal Academy of Fine Arts in Brussels from 1914 through 1918, and was mentored by Henry van de Velde. Together with his brother Pierre Bourgeois, he founded several magazines, including 7 Arts (1922–1928).

In 1927 Bourgeois became the only Belgian invited to design a house for the Weissenhof Estate exhibition in Stuttgart, and the following year Bourgeois was a delegate to the first meeting of the Congrès international d'architecture moderne and a founding member of that organization.

He died on 24 July 1962 in Ixelles.

== Cité Moderne ==
Bourgeois's first important architectural work was a group of houses in the Rue du Cubisme in Koekelberg (Brussels Region), showing the direct influence of the Dutch modernists. His largest project was built between 1922 and 1925 in Berchem-Sainte-Agathe (Brussels Region) for a cooperative for social housing, the Cité moderne included 275 units. Each of them are oriented towards the sun, with a private garden, and were designed for low-cost construction with the use of reinforced concrete, an experimental technique at the time.

The building style of the houses and small apartment houses was strictly unadorned, white with colored trim, with right angles and flat roofs, an early example of the modernist style. The entire district was planned by urban planner and landscape architect Louis Van der Swaelmen, intended to promote coexistence and solidarity between people, as well as provide for their safety. The names attributed to the streets and squares highlight these intentions: Foundation Street, Stewardship Street, Evolution Street, and Initiative Place.

The project earned Bourgeois the Grand Prize at the Exposition internationale des arts décoratifs et industriels modernes in 1925 and brought him international attention. Today it is said to be in poor condition and awaiting proper renovation.

Cité Moderne (Berchem-Sainte-Agathe)

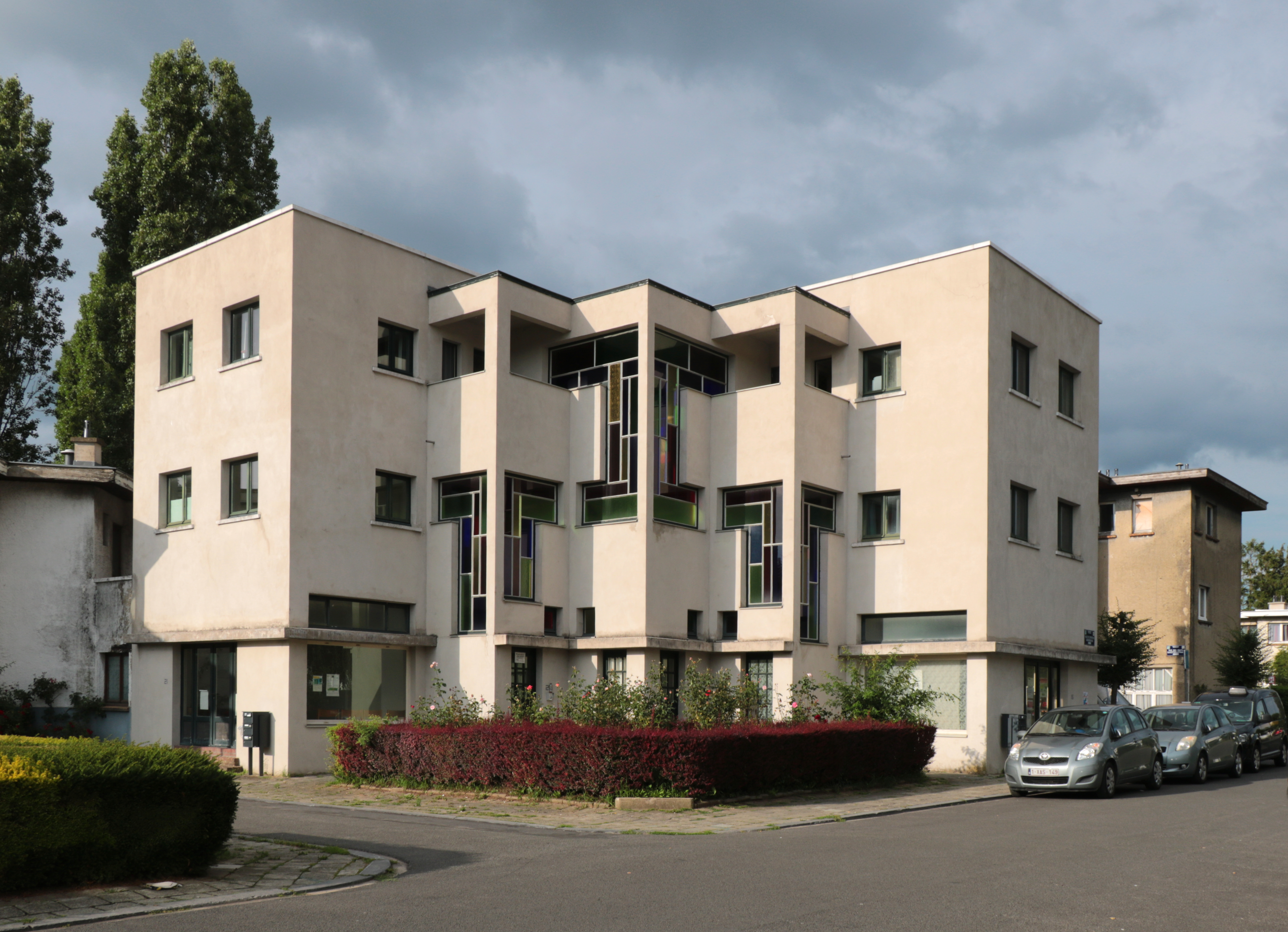

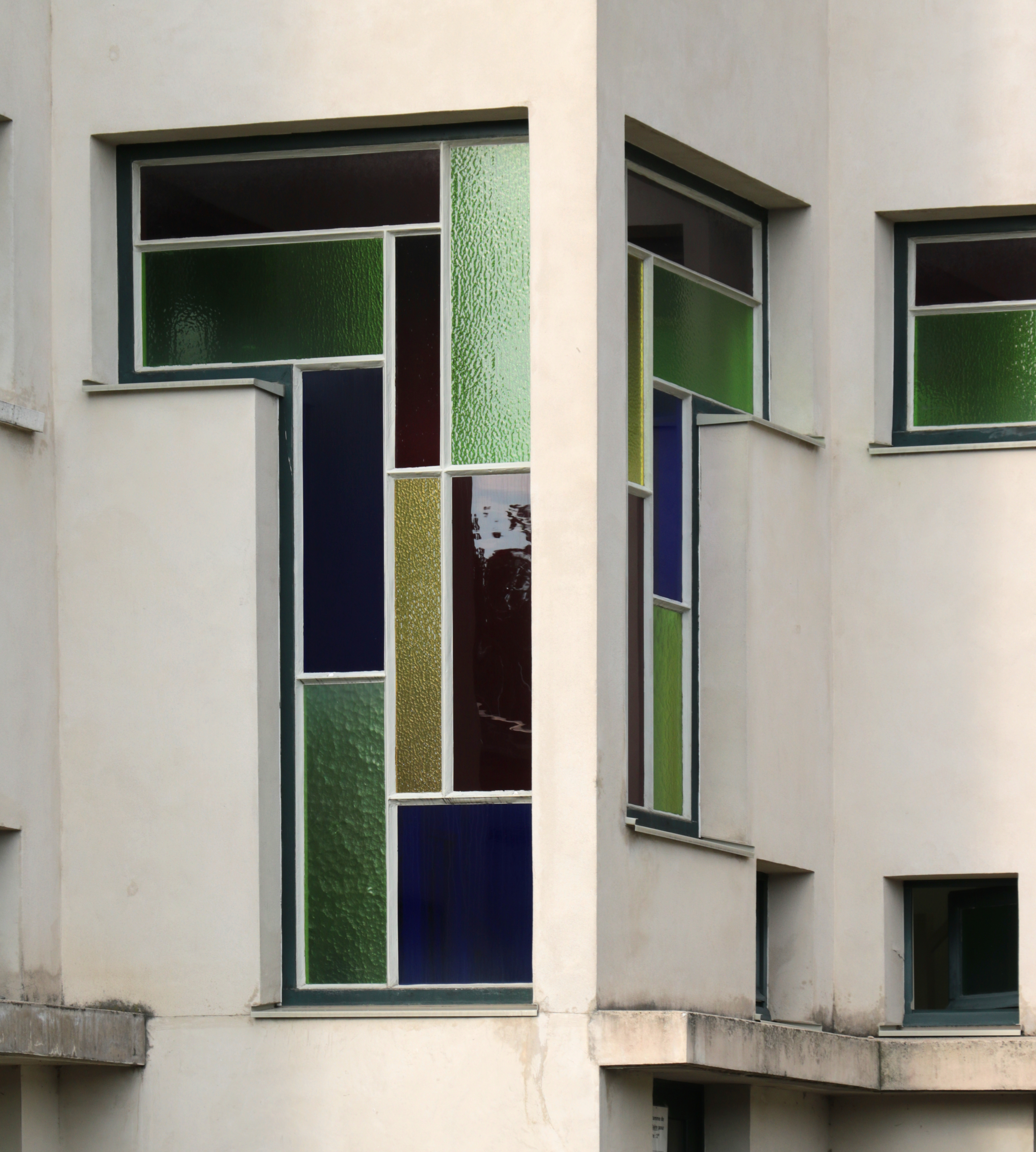

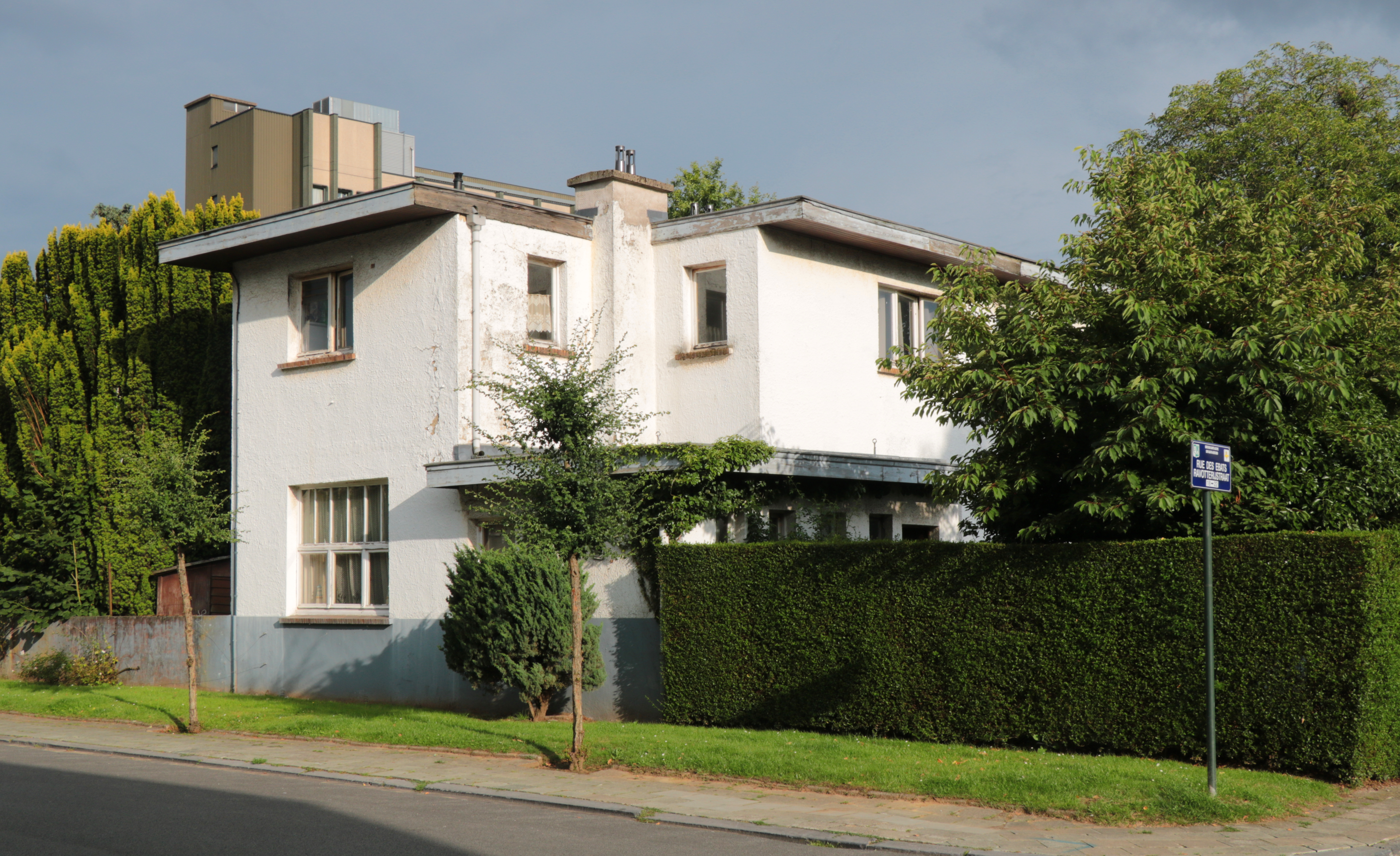

== Works ==
- Apartment building, Rue du Cubisme, Koekelberg, 1922
- Cité Moderne, Berchem-Sainte-Agathe, 1922–1925
- Housing entry for the Weissenhof Estate, Stuttgart, 1927
- House and studio for the sculptor Oscar Jespers, Brussels, 1928
- Apartment buildings in Brussels, 1935
- Grand Palace, Leopold II Restaurant and Soprocol Pavilion, Brussels International Exposition, 1935
- Villa Le Jeannerie, Sint-Genesius-Rode, 1936
- House Eliat, Avenue de l'Uruguay 5, Brussels, 1938
- Belgian Pavilion at the New York World's Fair, 1939, with Henry van de Velde and Léon Stynen
- Office des Comptes-Chèques Postaux, Brussels, 1937–1949
- Town Hall, Ostend, 1954–1960
- Town Hall, Nivelles, 1954
- Eternit Tower and Germinal Pavilion at the Expo 58, Brussels, 1958
