= Cuca Gamarra =

Spanish politician (born 1974)

Cuca Gamarra MP

Secretary-General of the People's Party
- In office 2 April 2022 – 4 July 2025
- President: Alberto Núñez Feijóo
- Preceded by: Teodoro García Egea
- Succeeded by: Miguel Tellado

Spokesperson of the Popular Group in the Congress of Deputies
- In office 21 August 2020 – 4 July 2025
- Preceded by: Cayetana Álvarez de Toledo
- Succeeded by: Miguel Tellado

Member of the Congress of Deputies
- Incumbent
- Assumed office 21 May 2019
- Constituency: La Rioja

Mayor of Logroño
- In office 11 June 2011 – 15 June 2019
- Preceded by: Tomás Santos
- Succeeded by: Pablo Hermoso de Mendoza

Member of the Logroño City Council
- In office 14 June 2003 – 15 June 2019

Personal details
- Born: Concepción Gamarra Ruiz-Clavijo; 23 December 1974 (age 51) Logroño, La Rioja, Spain
- Party: People's Party

Concepción "Cuca" Gamarra Ruiz-Clavijo (born 23 December 1974) is a Spanish politician who was a former Secretary-General of the People's Party.

== Biography ==
Born on 23 December 1974 in Logroño she earned a licentiate degree in Economic Law from the University of Deusto. Elected as municipal councillor of Logroño, she served as deputy mayor from 2003 to 2007. She became Mayor of Logroño after the 2011 municipal election.

She was re-elected Mayor of Logroño for a second mandate in the 2015 municipal election.

She endorsed Soraya Sáenz de Santamaría vis-à-vis the process for the election of the new PP leader in 2018.

She ran as candidate to the Congress of Deputies in the PP at the April 2019 general election, and was elected deputy. She held her seat at the November 2019 general election.

In August 2020, Pablo Casado chose her as the new spokesperson of the PP's parliamentary group in the Congress of Deputies, replacing Cayetana Álvarez de Toledo.
