= Headquarters of the People's Party (Spain) =

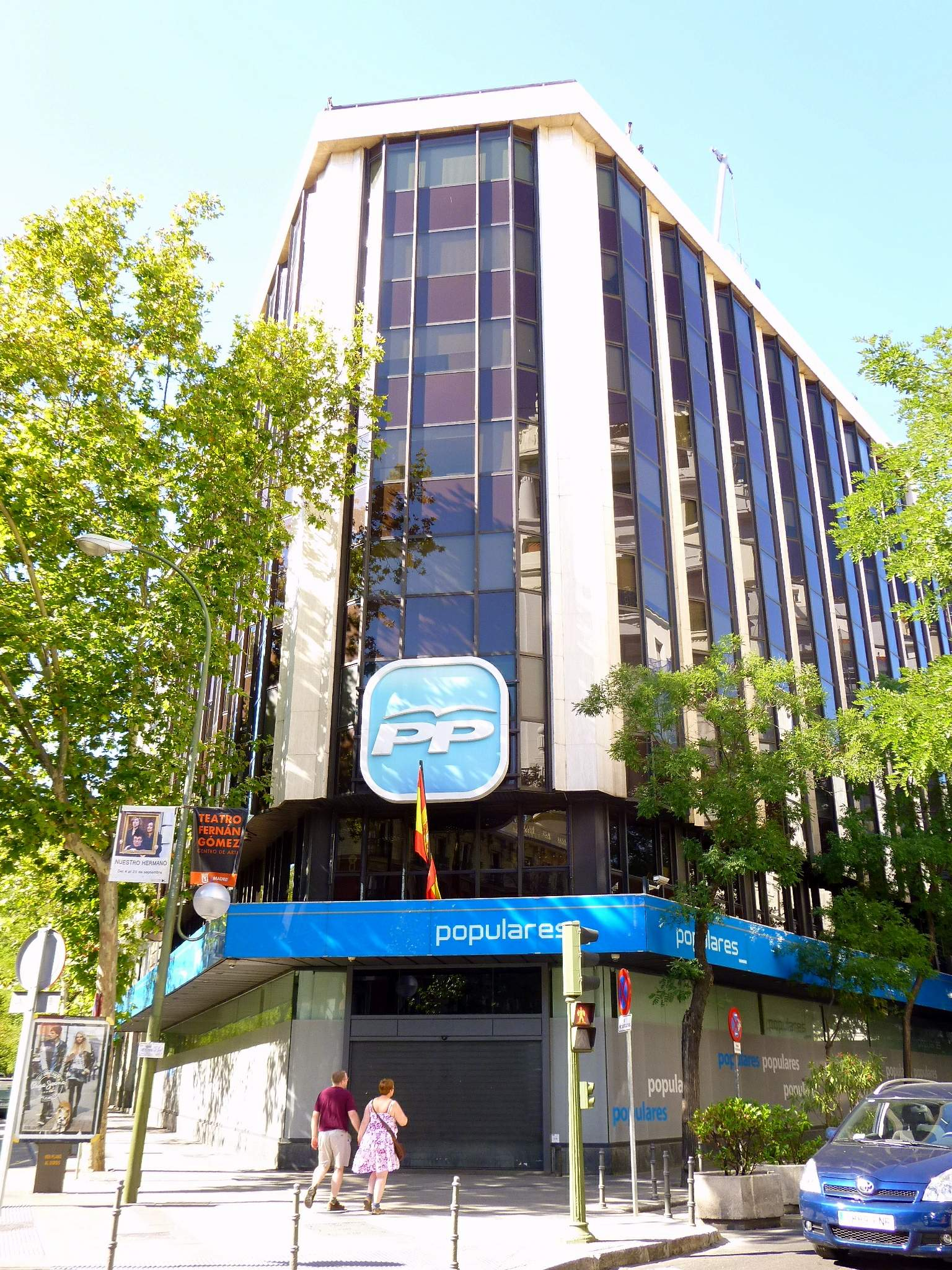

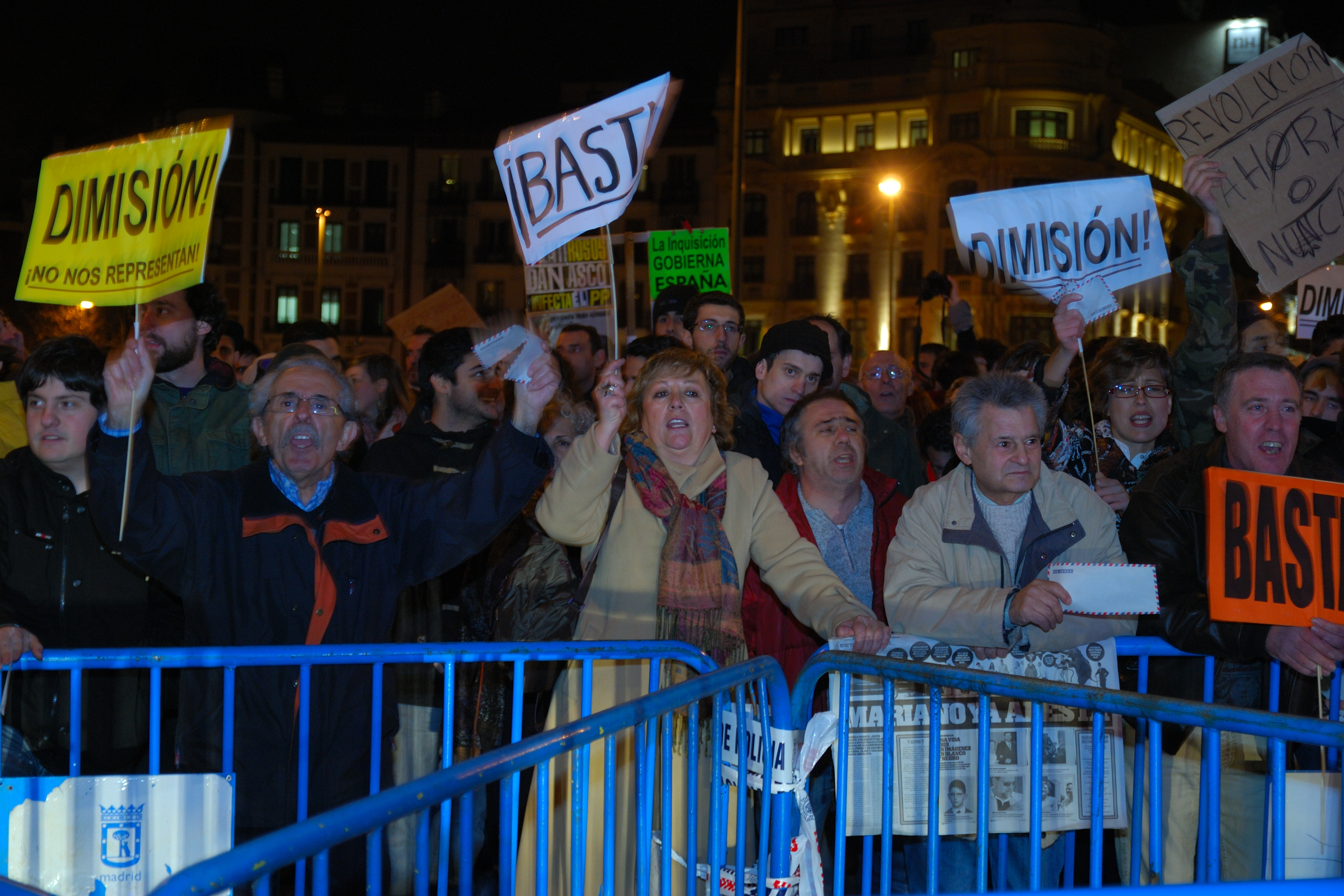
Protests outside the headquarters in 2013 relating to the Bárcenas affair concerning its illegal renovation payments

The Headquarters of the People's Party (Spanish: Sede del Partido Popular) are located at number 13, Calle de Génova in Madrid, Spain, at the corner with Calle Zurbano. In the Spanish media, "Génova" is used as a metonym for the national leadership of the People's Party.

== History of the site ==
The Calle de Génova – before 1886 known as the Ronda de Santa Bárbara or Ronda de Recoletos – was historically in the outskirts of Madrid, between two entrance gates that were built in the 18th century. These were the Puerta de Santa Bárbara and the Puerta de Alcalá, of which only the latter remains. The land that the building occupies was used as gardens by several convents in the area.

Although the dates are uncertain, the first building on the site was the Palace of the Marquises of Bedmar dating from after 1872, as palaces began to be built on the street. Its first occupier may have been Manuel Antonio de Acuña y Dewitte, the tenth marquess, who was a member of the Conservative Party. Only a few photographs were made of the building. Though the documentation is scarce, the palace may have passed to Isaac Peral—inventor of the submarine—who sold it to Luis de Marichalar y Monreal, another Conservative politician. It remained the property of his family until 1977, when it was sold, demolished and the new structure built in its place.

== Modern building ==
Under the leadership of Manuel Fraga, the People's Alliance (which became the People's Party in 1989) took 25% of the vote at the 1982 Spanish general election, establishing itself as a force in national politics. The following February, the party moved from Calle Silva to this site; it was initially rented from the insurance company Mapfre and not bought outright until March 2006. The fee was €37 million, or about 1 million Spanish pesetas per square metre over 6,000 square metres across seven storeys.

The renovation of the headquarters in 2007 was the subject of the Bárcenas affair, in which it was proven that party treasurer Luis Bárcenas paid over €1 million to the renovation company without declaring it to the national treasury.

In December 2014, Daniel Pérez Berlanga deliberately crashed a car filled with butane canisters into the entrance of the building. He claimed that his motive was "to call attention to what's happening in the country". He was imprisoned for five years and fined €40,000.

PP president Pablo Casado unexpectedly announced in February 2021 a desire for the party to sell the building and move elsewhere, as a break with the past over scandals such as the Bárcenas affair. A year later, his successor Alberto Núñez Feijóo halted the plan.
