= Woman with Mirror =

Sculpture by Fernando Botero

Coordinates: 40°25′31″N 3°41′28″W

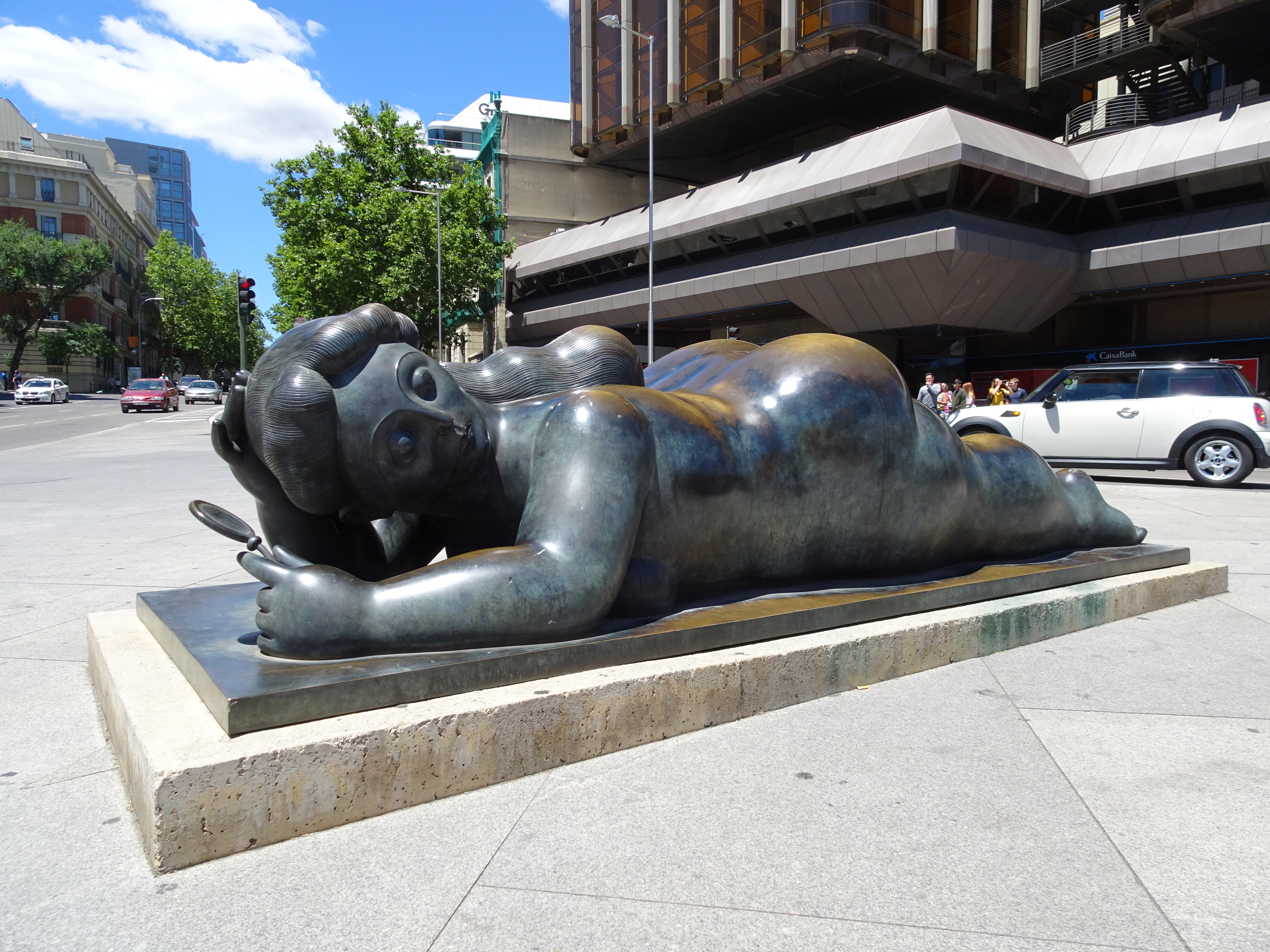
Mujer con espejo (1987), by Fernando Botero, Madrid

Woman with Mirror (Spanish: Mujer con espejo) is a 1987 bronze sculpture in Madrid, Spain, by the Colombian sculptor Fernando Botero. The 1,000-kilogram (2,200 lb) sculpture is of a nude woman with a large figure lying on her front; this body shape is a trademark of the sculptor.

In May 1994, an exhibition of Botero's works began in Madrid; by September, it had attracted two million visitors. A survey was taken by the sponsor, Caja Madrid, in which the most voted sculpture would be gifted for public exhibition in the city. Woman with Mirror was the most voted sculpture.

After being gifted to the city, the sculpture was installed on the Calle de Génova, near the entrance to the Plaza de Colón. By April 1995, two more of Botero's Madrid exhibits were on public display: The Hand (bought by Telefónica), and Raptio of Europa at Madrid–Barajas Airport.
