= People's Party (Spain) =

Spanish political party

People's Party Partido Popular
- Abbreviation: PP
- President: Alberto Núñez Feijóo
- Secretary-General: Miguel Tellado
- National spokesperson: Borja Sémper
- Spokesperson in Congress: Ester Muñoz
- Spokesperson in Senate: Alicia García
- Founder: Manuel Fraga
- Founded: 20 January 1989; 37 years ago
- Merger of: People's Alliance; Christian Democracy; Liberal Party
- Preceded by: People's Coalition
- Headquarters: Headquarters of the People's Party, C/ Génova, 13; 28004, Madrid
- Youth wing: New Generations
- Membership (2024): ▲806,000
- Ideology: Conservatism; Christian democracy
- Political position: Centre-right to right-wing
- Regional affiliation: Union of Latin American Parties
- European affiliation: European People's Party
- European Parliament group: European People's Party Group
- International affiliation: Centrist Democrat International; International Democracy Union
- Colours: Blue
- Anthem: "Himno del Partido Popular" ('Anthem of the People's Party')
- Congress of Deputies: 137 / 350
- Spanish Senate: 143 / 266
- European Parliament (Spanish seats): 22 / 61
- Regional parliaments: 465 / 1,261
- Regional governments: 14 / 19
- Local government: 23,412 / 60,941

Website
- pp.es

The People's Party (Spanish: Partido Popular [paɾˈtiðo popuˈlaɾ]) known mostly by its acronym, PP (Spanish: [peˈpe]), is a conservative and Christian democratic political party in Spain.

The People's Party was a 1989 re-foundation of People's Alliance (AP), a party led by former minister Manuel Fraga. It was founded in 1976 as an alliance of post-Francoist proto-parties. The new party combined the conservative AP with several small Christian democratic and liberal parties (the party calling this fusion of views "the Reformist Centre"). In 2002, Manuel Fraga received the honorary title of "Founding Chairman". The party's youth organisation is New Generations of the People's Party of Spain (NNGG).

The PP is a member of the centre-right European People's Party (EPP), and in the European Parliament its 16 MEPs sit in the EPP Group. The PP is also a member of the Centrist Democrat International and the International Democracy Union. The PP was also one of the founding organisations of the Budapest-based Robert Schuman Institute for Developing Democracy in Central and Eastern Europe.

On 24 May 2018, the National Court found that the PP profited from the illegal kickbacks-for-contracts scheme of the Gürtel affair, confirming the existence of an illegal accounting and financing structure that ran in parallel with the party's official one since the party's foundation in 1989; the court ruled that the PP helped establish "a genuine and effective system of institutional corruption through the manipulation of central, autonomous and local public procurement". This prompted a no confidence vote on Mariano Rajoy's government, which was brought down on 1 June 2018 in the first successful no-confidence motion since the Spanish transition to democracy. On 5 June 2018, Rajoy announced his resignation as PP leader.

On 21 July 2018, Pablo Casado was elected as the new leader of the PP. Under his leadership, the party was claimed to take a right-wing turn, including forging local alliances with the far-right Vox party. However, Casado later bet on breaking ties with Vox, and caused an unprecedented leadership crisis inside PP. After this there were rumors that Casado had ordered to spy on the popular president of the community of Madrid, Isabel Díaz Ayuso, for alleged irregularities, which collapsed popular support for PP according to opinion polls for future national elections, being resolved with the resignation of Casado and the appointment of the veteran Alberto Núñez Feijóo as the new leader, which improved the electoral expectations of the party. The party won the most votes in the 2023 general election, but it failed to secure a parliamentary majority.

== History ==
=== Political genealogy ===
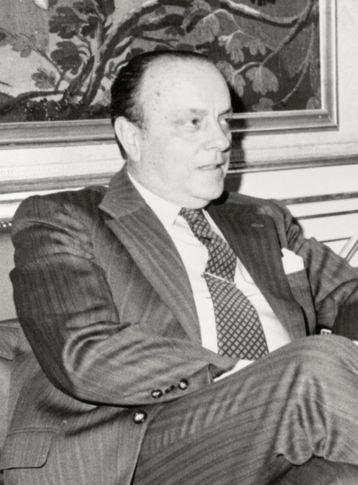
Fraga in 1983

The party has its roots in the People's Alliance founded on 9 October 1976, by former Francoist minister Manuel Fraga. Although Fraga was a member of the reformist faction of the Franco regime, he supported an extremely gradual transition to democracy. However, he badly underestimated the public's distaste for Francoism. Additionally, while he attempted to convey a reformist image, the large number of former Francoists in the party led the public to perceive it as both reactionary and authoritarian. In the June 1977 general election, the AP garnered only 8.3 percent of the vote, putting it in fourth place.

In the months following the 1977 elections, dissent erupted within the AP over constitutional issues that arose as the draft document was being formulated. Fraga had wanted from the beginning to brand the party as a traditional European conservative party, and wanted to move the AP toward the political centre in order to form a larger centre-right party. Fraga's wing won the struggle, prompting most of the disenchanted reactionaries to leave the party. The AP then joined with other moderate conservatives to form the Democratic Coalition (Coalición Democrática, CD).

It was hoped that this new coalition would capture the support of those who had voted for the Union of the Democratic Centre (UCD) in 1977, but who had become disenchanted with the Adolfo Suárez government. In the March 1979 general election, however, the CD received 6.1 percent of the vote, again finishing a distant fourth.

At the AP's Second Party Congress in December 1979, party leaders re-assessed their involvement in the CD. Many felt that the creation of the coalition had merely confused the voters, and they sought to emphasise the AP's independent identity. Fraga resumed control of the party, and the political resolutions adopted by the party congress reaffirmed the conservative orientation of the AP.

In the early 1980s, Fraga succeeded in rallying the various components of the right around his leadership. He was aided in his efforts to revive the AP by the increasing disintegration of the UCD. In the general elections held in October 1982, the AP gained votes both from previous UCD supporters and from the far right. It became the major opposition party to the Spanish Socialist Workers' Party, securing 25.4 percent of the popular vote. The AP's parliamentary representation had dropped to nine seats in 1979; the party allied itself with the small Christian democratic People's Democratic Party (PDP) and won 106 seats in 1982.

The increased strength of the AP was further evidenced in the municipal and regional elections held in May 1983, when the party drew 26 percent of the vote. A significant portion of the electorate appeared to support the AP's emphasis on law and order as well as its pro-business policies.

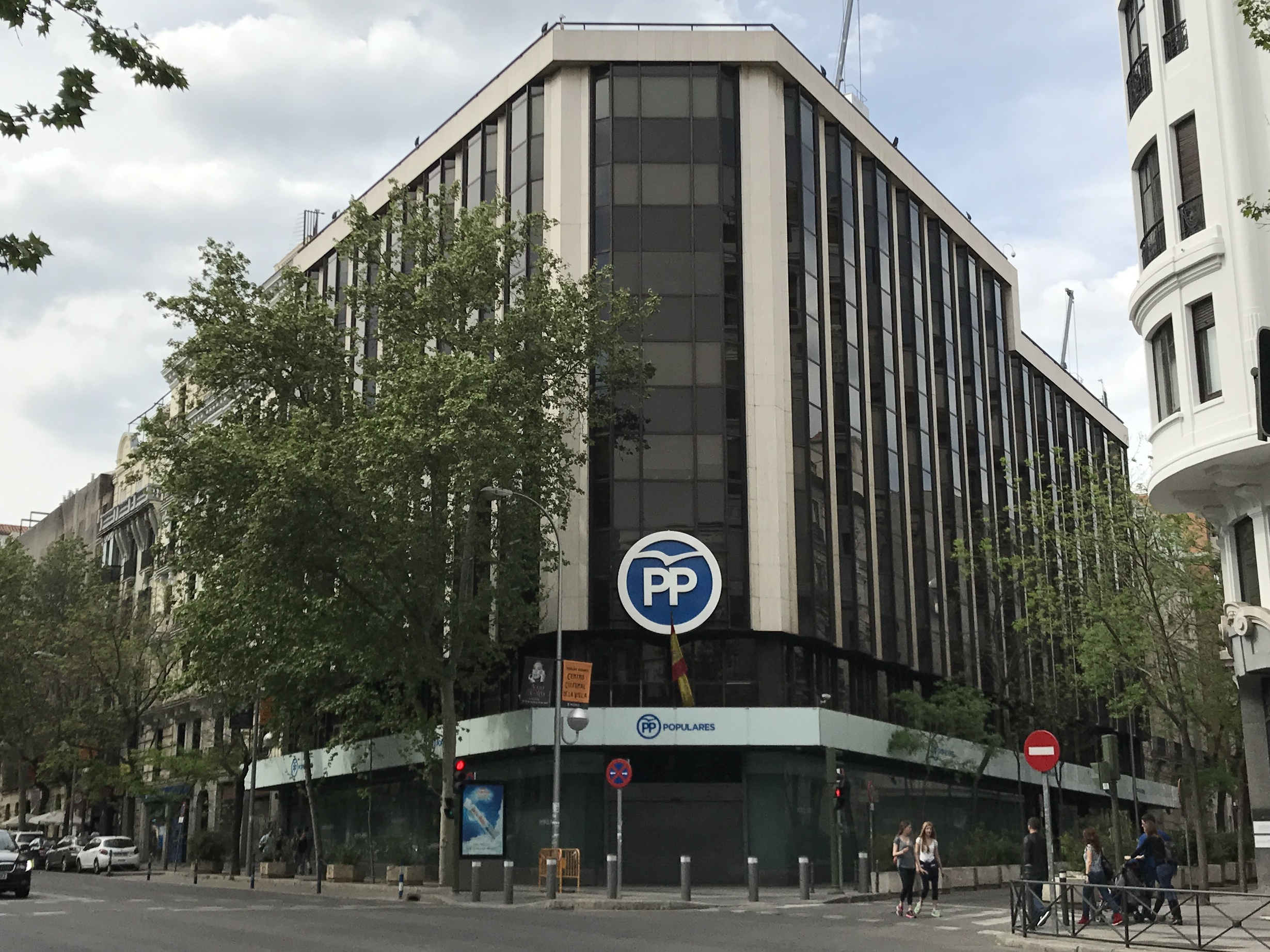
Headquarters on Calle de Génova in Madrid. As the party seat, the term Génova is often used as a metonym for the party leadership.

Subsequent political developments belied the party's aspirations to continue increasing its base of support. Prior to the June 1986 elections, the AP joined forces with the PDP and the Liberal Party (PL) to form the People's Coalition (CP), in another attempt to expand its constituency to include the centre of the political spectrum. The coalition called for stronger measures against terrorism, for more privatisation, and for a reduction in public spending and in taxes. The CP failed to increase its share of the vote in the 1986 elections, however, and it soon began to disintegrate.

When regional elections in late 1986 resulted in further losses for the coalition, Fraga resigned as AP chairman, although he retained his parliamentary seat. At the party congress in February 1987, Antonio Hernández Mancha was chosen to head the AP, declaring that under his leadership the AP would become a "modern right-wing European party". But Hernández Mancha lacked political experience at the national level, and the party continued to decline. When support for the AP plummeted in the municipal and regional elections held in June 1987, it was clear that it would be overtaken as major opposition party by Suárez's Democratic and Social Centre (CDS).

After the resignation of Manuel Fraga and the successive victories of the Spanish Socialist Workers' Party (PSOE) in the general elections of 1982 and 1986, the Popular Alliance entered a period of deep crisis. Fraga then took the reins and, at the Congress of January 1989, the constituent parties of the CP were folded into a new party, the People's Party. While the AP was the nucleus of the merged party, the PP tried to bill itself as a more moderate party than the AP. Fraga was the first chairman of the party, with Francisco Álvarez Cascos as the secretary general.

=== Refoundation ===
==== Aznar years (1989–2004) ====
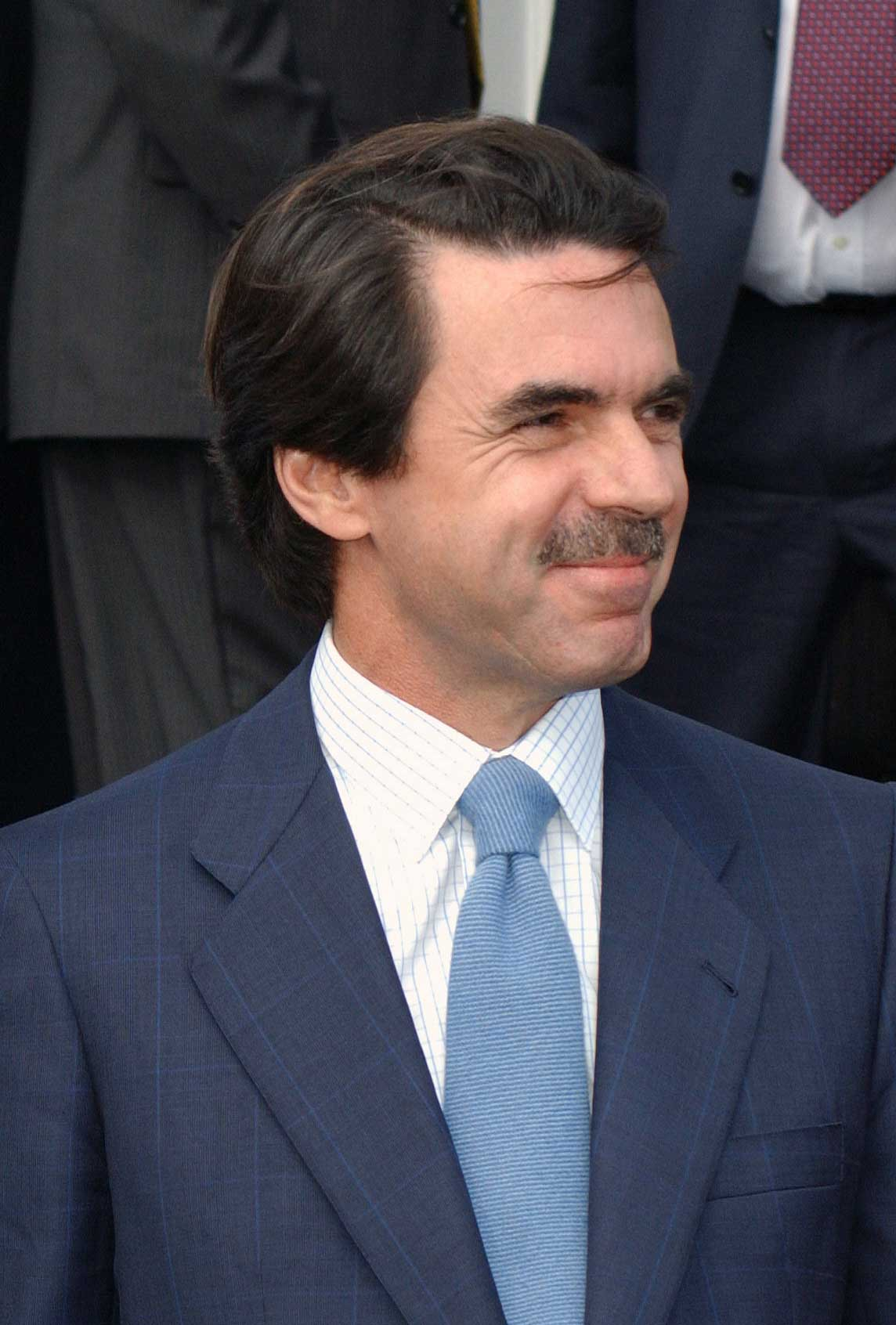
José María Aznar

Electoral logo for the 1989 election

On 4 September 1989, and at the suggestion of Fraga himself, José María Aznar (then premier of the Autonomous Region of Castile and León) was named the party's candidate for Prime Minister of Spain at the general elections. In April 1990, Aznar became chairman of the party. Fraga would later be named Founding Chairman of the People's Party.

The PP joined the European People's Party in 1991.

The PP became the largest party for the first time in 1996, and Aznar became Prime Minister with the support of the Basque Nationalist Party, the Catalan Convergence and Union and the Canarian Coalition. In the 2000 elections, the PP gained an absolute majority.

===== Foreign policy =====
Known to have a strong Atlanticist ideology, the People's Party fostered stronger ties to the United States.

==== Rajoy years (2004–2018) ====
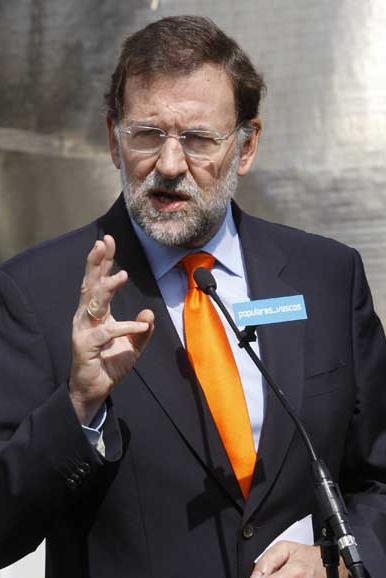
Mariano Rajoy during a speech in Bilbao

In August 2003, Mariano Rajoy was appointed Secretary General by Aznar. Thus, Rajoy became the party's candidate for Prime Minister in the 2004 general election, held three days after the 11 March 2004 Madrid train bombings, and which Rajoy lost by a big margin to Spanish Socialist Workers' Party (PSOE) leader José Luis Rodríguez Zapatero.

The PP under Mariano Rajoy opposed the PSOE government after the PP lost the general election in 2004, arguing that this victory was influenced by the Madrid bombings of 11 March 2004. At a national level, its political strategy has followed two main axes, both linked to Spain's delicate regional politics: Firstly, opposing further administrative devolution to Catalonia by means of the newly approved "Estatut" or Statute of Catalonia, which lays out the powers of the Catalan regional government. Secondly, opposition to political negotiations with the Basque separatist organisation ETA.

The People's Party has supported the Association of Victims of Terrorism (AVT) with respect to the Government's actions concerning ETA's ceasefire, and mobilised hundreds of thousands of people in demonstrations against Government policies that, in its opinion, would result in political concessions to ETA. Nevertheless, the end of the ceasefire in December 2006 ended prospects for government negotiations with ETA.

The prospect of increased demands for autonomy in the programs of Catalan and Basque parties, and Zapatero's alleged favouring of them, became a focus for the party's campaign for the March 2008 general election. Basque President Juan José Ibarretxe's proposal for a unilateral referendum for the solution of the Basque Conflict was another important issue.

The People's Party under Rajoy has an increasingly patriotic, or nationalist, element to it, appealing to the sense of "Spanishness" and making strong use of national symbols such as the Spanish flag. Prior to the national celebrations of Spanish Heritage Day, Rajoy made a speech asking Spaniards to "privately or publicly" display their pride in their nation and to honor their flag, an action which received some criticism from many political groups in the Congress of Deputies.

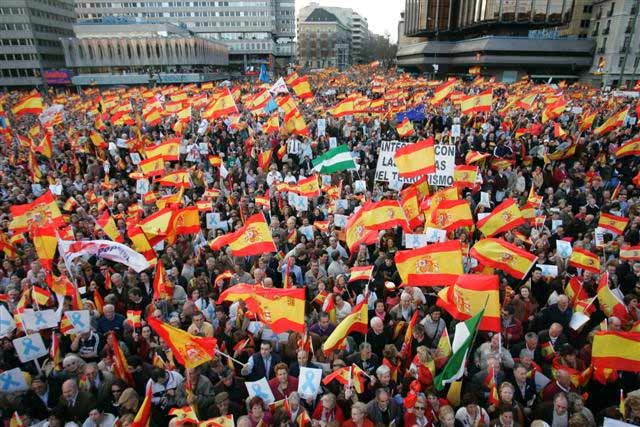
PP demonstration in 2007 in opposition to releasing an ETA member from prison

===== 2008 elections and convention =====
2008–2015 party logo

On 9 March 2008, Spain held a general election, with both main parties led by the same candidates who competed in 200; 154 People's Party MPs were elected, up from six in the previous election. However, the failure to close the gap with the ruling Spanish Socialist Workers' Party (which increased its number of MPs by five) provoked a party crisis, in which some internal groups and supportive media questioned the leadership of Rajoy, who was said to be close to resigning.

After an impasse of three days, he decided to stay, and summoned a Party Convention to be held in June 2008 in Valencia. Speculation about alternative candidates erupted in the media, with discussion of the possible candidacies of Madrid Mayor Alberto Ruíz Gallardón and Madrid autonomous community Premier Esperanza Aguirre creating a national debate, calls for support and opposition from the media, etc.

In the end, neither one stood, with Gallardón explicitly backing Rajoy and Aguirre refusing to comment on the issue. The only politician who explicitly expressed his intention to stand was Juan Costa, who had been a minister under Aznar, but he was unable to garner the 20% support required to stand in the election because of the support Rajoy had received prior to his nomination. At the convention, Mariano Rajoy was re-elected chairman with 79% of the vote, and in order to "refresh the negative public image of the party", which had been a major factor in the electoral defeat, its leadership was controversially renewed with young people, replacing a significant number of politicians from the Aznar era.

Among the latter, most resigned of their own accord to make room for the next generation, like the PP Spokesman in the Congress of Deputies Eduardo Zaplana, replaced by Soraya Sáenz de Santamaría, and the party Secretary-General Ángel Acebes, whose office was taken by María Dolores de Cospedal. (Note: Also, María del Mar Blanco, sister of the PP councilor Miguel Ángel Blanco (who was assassinated by ETA in 1997), was elected into the new leadership to represent the Association of Victims of Terrorism.)

The convention also saw significant reforms to the Party Statutes, including the reform of election to the office of Party Chairperson, which was to be open to more competition; and linking that office to the party candidacy in the general elections, etc. María San Gil, Chairwoman of the Basque PP, left the party (even resigning from her Basque Parliament seat) over disagreements on the party policies towards regional nationalisms in Spain, and particularly over the deletion of a direct reference to the Basque Nationalist Party accusing them of being too passive and "contemptuous" regarding the armed Basque group ETA. Most PP members rallied behind San Gil at first, but when it became clear that her decision was final the national leadership called a regional party election, in which Antonio Basagoiti was chosen as the new Basque PP leader.

2015–2019 party logo

The PP won a clear victory in the 2011 general elections, ousting the PSOE from government. With 44.62% of the votes, the conservatives won 186 seats in the Congreso de los Diputados, the biggest victory they have ever had. On the other hand, the centre-left PSOE suffered a huge defeat, losing 59 MPs. The PP, under Mariano Rajoy's leadership, returned to power after 7 years of opposition.

In May 2018, the Audiencia Nacional declared the PP as guilty part "on a lucrative basis" in the Gürtel corruption scheme, understanding it profited from the corruption scheme "to the detriment of the State's interests". This led to a motion of no confidence in the prime minister Mariano Rajoy, led by socialist leader Pedro Sánchez, which eventually succeeded, thus forcing Rajoy to quit his position, and ultimately resign as the party's leader. His substitute would be determined in July 2018.

==== Leadership of Casado (2018–2022) ====
Pablo Casado's victory in the July 2018 PP leadership election was considered a party swing towards the right.

Polls indicated a continual decline in support for the PP in the lead-up to the April 2019 general election. Ultimately, the party achieved the worst result in its history, winning just 16.7% of the national vote – a decline of almost 16% from the 2016 election – and losing over half its seats. Though becoming only the second largest party in the Congress of Deputies, it held almost half as many seats as first placed PSOE, and was less than a single percentage point and just nine seats ahead of third-placed Ciudadanos. Casado refused to resign following the poor result, and proposed a sudden U-turn of the party back into the moderate centre-right under pressure from party regional leaders one month ahead of the regional and local elections.

The party enjoyed a partial revival in the 2019 European elections, winning 20.15% of votes. The party increased its support in the November 2019 election, scoring 20.82% of votes and electing 89 deputies and 83 senators.

===== 2022 internal organisational crisis =====
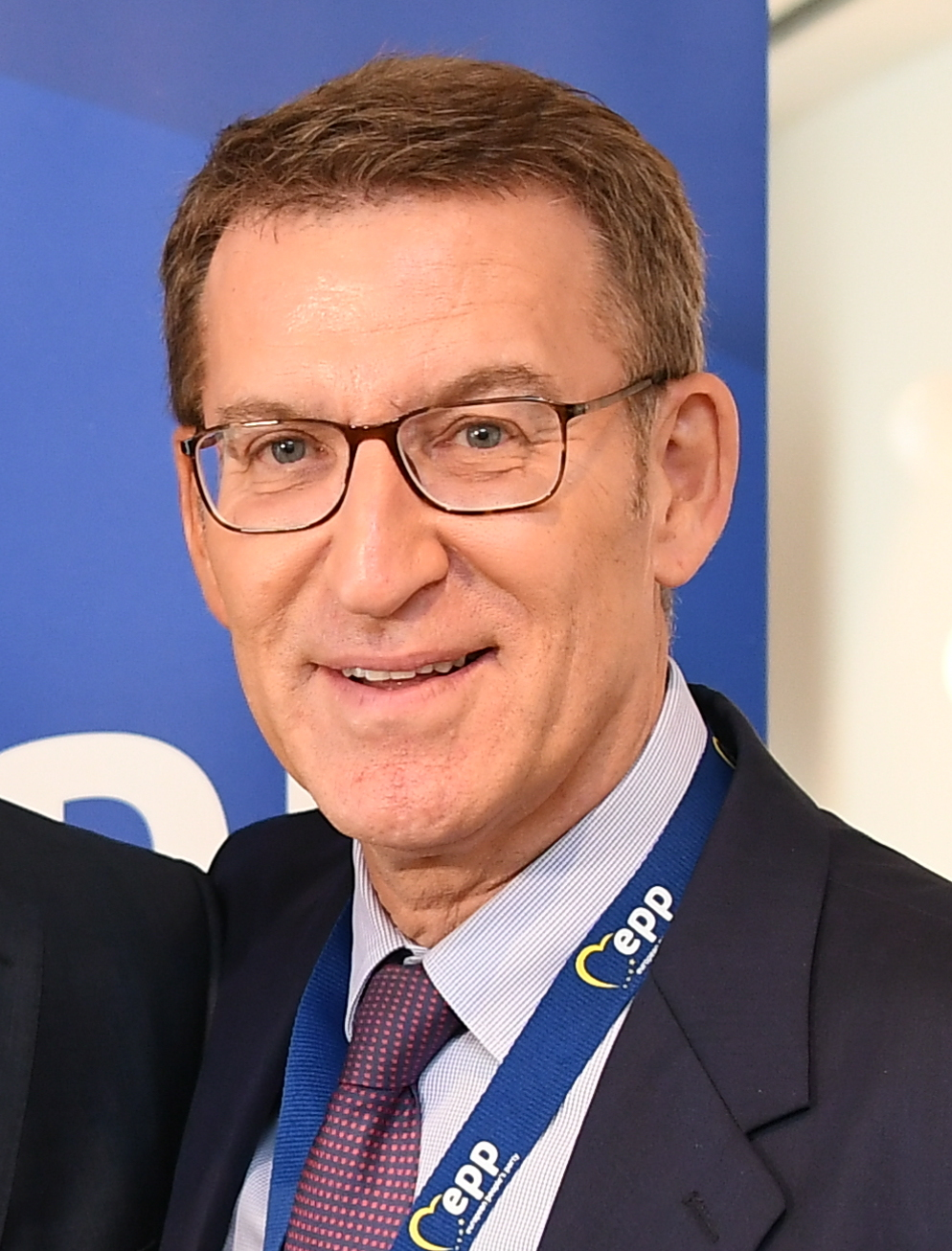
Alberto Núñez Feijóo became the People's Party after the ousting of Pablo Casado.

After a few months of confrontation between the president of the Community of Madrid, Isabel Díaz Ayuso, and the leadership of the national branch of the party, on 16 February 2022, information appeared about an alleged payment (in the form of a commission) to Díaz Ayuso's brother for health material and also about alleged spying on the president's family by the party leadership through the City Council of Madrid. The following day, in an appearance the president herself accused the national leadership of the PP of wanting to destroy her politically. That afternoon, the secretary general, Teodoro García Egea, appeared to deny all the information related to the attempt to spy on the president's entourage; in this appearance, Egea informed of the opening of an informative file on the actions of the president of Madrid, which was closed the following day, considering the documentation provided valid. A few hours later, that same day, Ángel Carromero, a trusted person of the Mayor of Madrid, José Luis Martínez-Almeida, resigned after the release of some audios in which one of the detectives claimed to have been contacted from the Empresa Municipal de la Vivienda y Suelo (Municipal Housing and Land Company).

The following day, President Pablo Casado stated on the Cadena COPE radio channel that Díaz Ayuso should provide all the necessary documentation to clear doubts about her honorability, questioning at the same time his honesty by stating whether "it is logical to award a commission to your brother in April 2020, when 700 people were dying in Spain due to the pandemic".

This led to a schism in the leadership of the PP, in which regional leaders and popular leaders demanded political responsibilities and a change of leadership and responsibilities in the apparatus. On 22 February there was a cascade of resignations of senior party officials and the demand by the majority of territorial barons and the Popular Parliamentary Group for the holding of an Extraordinary Congress, in addition to the request for the resignation of the Secretary General, which took place that same day. Casado finally agreed to convene the National Board of Directors on 1 March to set in motion an Extraordinary Congress of the PP. Casado was subsequently replaced as leader by Alberto Núñez Feijóo, the president of Galicia.

==== Alberto Núñez Feijóo's leadership (2022–present) ====
After becoming the party's leader, Feijóo designated Cuca Gamarra, the PP's spokesperson in the Congress of Deputies, as the new Secretary General. After the PP took several regions—including Aragon, the Balearic Islands, and Valencia—from the PSOE in Spain's 2023 regional and local elections, Sánchez called for a snap general election. The conservative party gained forty-eight seats in Congress and an absolute majority in the Senate, winning the elections. The PP failed to secure a parliamentary majority with its allies, Canarian Coalition, Navarrese People's Union (UPN), and VOX; however, King of Spain Felipe VI requested that Feijóo try to form a government.

== Ideology ==
Once described as the main liberal-conservative party of Spain, political scientists Vít Hlousek and Lubomír Kopeček have observed that under the leadership of José María Aznar the party evolved into a conservative party with elements of Christian democracy and economic liberalism. It was described as Christian humanist in 2003 and conservative liberal in 1998 and 2010. On the other hand, sociologist Vicenç Navarro considered the PP a conservative-neoliberal coalition with a neoliberal economic policy.

The party supports the regional structure in autonomous communities enshrined in the Constitution of 1978, as well as the constitutional monarchy.

When Spain first legalised same-sex marriage in 2005, the party was opposed to the same-sex marriage law. It did, however, support marriage-like civil unions for same-sex couples. The party organised demonstrations against the same-sex marriage law. After the law was deemed constitutional in 2012, the PP government announced that it would no longer seek the repeal of same-sex marriage. While the party has a strong socially conservative faction, some politicians from the People's Party now support same-sex marriage. Some PP regional governments have introduced legislation against discrimination based on sexual orientation and gender identity. PP officials have denied the scientific consensus on climate change.

== Illegal financing ==
In early 2009, a scandal involving several senior members of the party came to the public's attention. The Gürtel affair resulted in the resignation of the party's treasurer Luis Bárcenas in 2009. The case against him was dropped in July 2011 but reopened the following year.

The leader of the party in the Valencia region, Francisco Camps, stepped down in July 2011 because of a pending trial. He was accused of having received gifts in exchange for public contracts, but was found to be not guilty.

=== Bárcenas affair ===
In January 2013, the judges' investigation discovered an account in Switzerland controlled by Luis Bárcenas with €22 million euros and another €4.5 million in the United States. Allegations appeared in the media regarding the existence of supposed illegal funds of the PP, used for the undercover monthly payments to VIPs in the party from 1989 to 2009, including the former government presidents, Mariano Rajoy and José María Aznar. The existence of such illicit funding has been denied by the PP.

=== Lezo Case ===
Judge Eloy Velasco instructing the Lezo Case in the Spanish National Court is investigating former President of the Community of Madrid, Ignacio González, former Minister of Labour, Eduardo Zaplana, Vice-councilor of the presidency of the Community of Madrid and implicated in Gürtel affair Alberto López Viejo, businessmen Juan Miguel Villar Mir (OHL) and PricewaterhouseCoopers among others for embezzlement of public funds to presumably finance People's Party (PP) campaigns in the Community of Madrid.

== Organization ==
=== Leadership ===
| President | Term |
|---|---|
| Manuel Fraga | 1989–1990 |
| José María Aznar | 1990–2004 |
| Mariano Rajoy | 2004–2018 |
| Pablo Casado | 2018–2022 |
| Alberto Núñez Feijóo | 2022–present |

| Secretary-General | Term |
|---|---|
| Francisco Álvarez-Cascos | 1989–1999 |
| Javier Arenas | 1999–2003 |
| Mariano Rajoy | 2003–2004 |
| Ángel Acebes | 2004–2008 |
| María Dolores de Cospedal | 2008–2018 |
| Teodoro García Egea | 2018–2022 |
| Cuca Gamarra | 2022–2025 |
| Miguel Tellado | 2025– |

| Prime Ministers of Spain | Term |
|---|---|
| José María Aznar | 1996–2004 |
| Mariano Rajoy | 2011–2018 |

==== Regional leaders ====
- Andalusia: Juan Manuel Moreno (since 2014)
- Aragon: Jorge Azcón (since 2022)
- Asturias: Álvaro Queipo (since 2023)
- Balearic Islands: Marga Prohens (since 2021)
- Basque Country: Javier de Andrés (since 2023)
- Canary Islands: Manuel Domínguez (since 2022)
- Cantabria: María José Sáenz (since 2017)
- Castile and León: Alfonso Fernández Mañueco (since 2017)
- Castilla-La Mancha: Francisco Núñez (since 2018)
- Catalonia: Alejandro Fernández (since 2018)
- Ceuta: Juan Jesús Vivas (since 2009)
- Community of Madrid: Isabel Díaz Ayuso (since 2022)
- Extremadura: María Guardiola (since 2022)
- Galicia: Alfonso Rueda (since 2022)
- La Rioja: Gonzalo Capellán (since 2022)
- Melilla: Juan José Imbroda (since 2000)
- Murcia: Fernando López (since 2017)
- Navarre: Vacant (since 2026)
- Valencian Community: Juanfran Pérez Llorca (since 2025)

== Electoral performance ==
=== Cortes Generales ===
Cortes Generales
| Election | Leading candidate | Congress | | | Senate | | | Gov. |
| Election | Leading candidate | Votes | % | Seats | Votes | % | Seats | Gov. |
| 1989 | José María Aznar | 5,285,972 | 25.8 (#2) | 107 / 350 | 14,459,290 | 26.1 (#2) | 78 / 208 | No |
| 1993 | José María Aznar | 8,201,463 | 34.8 (#2) | 141 / 350 | 22,467,236 | 34.5 (#2) | 93 / 208 | No |
| 1996 | José María Aznar | 9,716,006 | 38.8 (#**1**) | 156 / 350 | 26,788,282 | 39.0 (#**1**) | 112 / 208 | Yes |
| 2000 | José María Aznar | 10,321,178 | 44.5 (#**1**) | 183 / 350 | 28,097,204 | 45.4 (#**1**) | 127 / 208 | Yes |
| 2004 | Mariano Rajoy | 9,763,144 | 37.7 (#2) | 148 / 350 | 26,639,965 | 37.9 (#**1**) | 102 / 208 | No |
| 2008 | Mariano Rajoy | 10,278,010 | 39.9 (#2) | 154 / 350 | 28,039,592 | 40.2 (#**1**) | 101 / 208 | No |
| 2011 | Mariano Rajoy | 10,866,566 | 44.6 (#**1**) | 186 / 350 | 29,363,775 | 46.3 (#**1**) | 136 / 208 | Yes |
| 2015 | Mariano Rajoy | 7,236,965 | 28.7 (#**1**) | 123 / 350 | 20,105,650 | 30.3 (#**1**) | 124 / 208 | — |
| 2016 | Mariano Rajoy | 7,941,236 | 33.0 (#**1**) | 137 / 350 | 22,285,969 | 34.2 (#**1**) | 130 / 208 | Yes (Note: 2016–2018.) |
| 2016 | Mariano Rajoy | 7,941,236 | 33.0 (#**1**) | 137 / 350 | 22,285,969 | 34.2 (#**1**) | 130 / 208 | No (Note: 2018–2019.) |
| Apr. 2019 | Pablo Casado | 4,373,653 | 16.7 (#2) | 66 / 350 | 13,757,395 | 19.2 (#2) | 54 / 208 | — |
| Nov. 2019 | Pablo Casado | 5,047,040 | 20.8 (#2) | 89 / 350 | 17,074,301 | 26.8 (#2) | 83 / 208 | No |
| 2023 | Alberto Núñez Feijóo | 8,160,837 | 33.1 (#**1**) | 137 / 350 | 23,536,366 | 34.5 (#**1**) | 120 / 208 | No |

=== European Parliament ===
European Parliament
| Election | Leading candidate | Votes | % | Seats | EP Group |
| 1989 | Marcelino Oreja | 3,395,015 | 21.4 (#2) | 15 / 60 | EPP |
| 1994 | Abel Matutes | 7,453,900 | 40.1 (#**1**) | 28 / 64 | EPP |
| 1999 | Loyola de Palacio | 8,410,993 | 39.7 (#**1**) | 27 / 64 | EPP–ED |
| 2004 | Jaime Mayor Oreja | 6,393,192 | 41.2 (#2) | 24 / 54 | EPP–ED |
| 2009 | Jaime Mayor Oreja | 6,670,377 | 42.1 (#**1**) | 24 / 54 | EPP |
| 2014 | Miguel Arias Cañete | 4,098,339 | 26.1 (#**1**) | 16 / 54 | EPP |
| 2019 | Dolors Montserrat | 4,519,205 | 20.2 (#2) | 13 / 59 | EPP |
| 2024 | Dolors Montserrat | 5,996,627 | 34.2 (#**1**) | 22 / 61 | EPP |

=== Results timeline ===
| Party | Year | (Spain) ES | (European Union) EU | (Andalusia) AN | (Aragon) AR | (Asturias) AS | (Canary Islands) CN | (Cantabria) CB | (Castilla–La Mancha) CM | (Castile and León) CL | (Catalonia) CT | (Ceuta) CE | (Extremadura) EX | (Galicia (Spain)) GL | (Balearic Islands) IB | RI | (Community of Madrid) MD | (Melilla) ML | (Region of Murcia) MC | (Navarre) NC | (Basque Country (autonomous community)) PV | (Valencian Community) CV |
| AP | 1988 | For continuation before 1988, see the AP's timeline | | | | | | | | | | | | | | | | | | | | |
|---|---|---|---|---|---|---|---|---|---|---|---|---|---|---|---|---|---|---|---|---|---|---|
| PP | 1989 | ▼25.8 | ▼21.4 | N/A | N/A | N/A | N/A | N/A | N/A | N/A | N/A | N/A | N/A | ▲44.0 | N/A | N/A | N/A | N/A | N/A | N/A | N/A | N/A |
| PP | 1990 | ▼25.8 | ▼21.4 | ▲22.2 | N/A | N/A | N/A | N/A | N/A | N/A | N/A | N/A | N/A | | N/A | N/A | N/A | N/A | N/A | N/A | ▲8.2 | N/A |
| PP | 1991 | ▼25.8 | ▼21.4 | ▲22.2 | ▲20.7 | ▲30.4 | ▲12.8 | ▼14.4 | ▼35.9 | ▲43.5 | N/A | N/A | ▲26.8 | | ▲**47.3** | ▲41.7 | ▲42.7 | N/A | ▲33.5 | (Note: UPN operated as the Navarrese branch of the PP) | ▲8.2 | ▲27.8 |
| PP | 1992 | ▼25.8 | ▼21.4 | ▲22.2 | | ▲30.4 | ▲12.8 | | ▼35.9 | | ▲6.0 | N/A | ▲26.8 | | | ▲41.7 | ▲42.7 | N/A | ▲33.5 | (Note: UPN operated as the Navarrese branch of the PP) | ▲8.2 | ▲27.8 |
| PP | 1993 | ▲34.8 | ▼21.4 | ▲22.2 | | ▲30.4 | | | ▼35.9 | | ▲6.0 | N/A | ▲26.8 | ▲52.1 | | ▲41.7 | ▲42.7 | N/A | ▲33.5 | (Note: UPN operated as the Navarrese branch of the PP) | ▲8.2 | ▲27.8 |
| PP | 1994 | ▲34.8 | ▲40.1 | ▲34.4 | | ▲30.4 | | | ▼35.9 | | ▲6.0 | N/A | ▲26.8 | | | ▲41.7 | ▲42.7 | N/A | ▲33.5 | (Note: UPN operated as the Navarrese branch of the PP) | ▲14.2 | ▲27.8 |
| PP | 1995 | ▲34.8 | ▲40.1 | ▲34.4 | ▲37.5 | ▲**42.0** | ▲31.1 | ▲32.5 | ▲44.3 | ▲**52.2** | ▲**13.1** | 30.9 | ▲39.5 | | ▼44.8 | ▲49.4 | ▲51.0 | 47.2 | ▲52.2 | (Note: UPN operated as the Navarrese branch of the PP) | ▲14.2 | ▲42.8 |
| PP | 1996 | ▲38.8 | ▲40.1 | ▼34.0 | | | | | ▲44.3 | | ▲**13.1** | 30.9 | ▲39.5 | | | | | | | (Note: UPN operated as the Navarrese branch of the PP) | ▲14.2 | |
| PP | 1997 | | ▲40.1 | ▼34.0 | | | | | ▲44.3 | | ▲**13.1** | | ▲39.5 | ▲**52.2** | | | | | | (Note: UPN operated as the Navarrese branch of the PP) | ▲14.2 | |
| PP | 1998 | | ▲40.1 | ▼34.0 | | | | | ▲44.3 | | ▲**13.1** | | ▲39.5 | | | | | | | (Note: UPN operated as the Navarrese branch of the PP) | ▲19.9 | |
| PP | 1999 | | ▼39.7 | ▼34.0 | ▲38.2 | ▼32.3 | ▼27.1 | ▲42.5 | ▼40.4 | ▼50.4 | ▼9.5 | ▼28.0 | ▲40.0 | | ▼44.0 | ▲51.3 | ▲51.1 | ▼18.7 | ▲52.8 | (Note: UPN operated as the Navarrese branch of the PP) | ▲19.9 | ▲47.9 |
| PP | 2000 | ▲44.5 | ▼39.7 | ▲38.0 | ▲38.2 | ▼32.3 | | | ▼40.4 | | ▼9.5 | | ▲40.0 | | ▼44.0 | | | ▼18.7 | | (Note: UPN operated as the Navarrese branch of the PP) | ▲19.9 | |
| PP | 2001 | | ▼39.7 | ▲38.0 | ▲38.2 | ▼32.3 | | | ▼40.4 | | ▼9.5 | | ▲40.0 | ▼51.6 | ▼44.0 | | | | | (Note: UPN operated as the Navarrese branch of the PP) | ▲**22.9** | |
| PP | 2002 | | ▼39.7 | ▲38.0 | ▲38.2 | ▼32.3 | | | ▼40.4 | | ▼9.5 | | ▲40.0 | | ▼44.0 | | | | | (Note: UPN operated as the Navarrese branch of the PP) | ▲**22.9** | |
| PP | 2003 | | ▼39.7 | ▲38.0 | ▼30.7 | ▲39.2 | ▲30.6 | ▼42.5 | ▼36.7 | ▼48.5 | ▲11.9 | ▲62.6 | ▼38.7 | | ▲44.7 | ▼48.6 | ▼46.7 | ▲55.0 | ▲56.7 | (Note: UPN operated as the Navarrese branch of the PP) | ▲**22.9** | ▼47.2 |
| PP | 2003 | | ▼39.7 | ▲38.0 | ▼30.7 | ▲39.2 | | ▼42.5 | ▼36.7 | | ▲11.9 | | ▼38.7 | | | | ▲48.5 | | | (Note: UPN operated as the Navarrese branch of the PP) | ▲**22.9** | |
| PP | 2004 | ▼37.7 | ▲41.2 | ▼31.5 | ▼30.7 | ▲39.2 | | ▼42.5 | ▼36.7 | | ▲11.9 | | ▼38.7 | | | | | | | (Note: UPN operated as the Navarrese branch of the PP) | ▲**22.9** | |
| PP | 2005 | ▼37.7 | ▲41.2 | ▼31.5 | ▼30.7 | ▲39.2 | | ▼42.5 | ▼36.7 | | ▲11.9 | | ▼38.7 | ▼45.2 | | | | | | (Note: UPN operated as the Navarrese branch of the PP) | ▼17.3 | |
| PP | 2006 | ▼37.7 | ▲41.2 | ▼31.5 | ▼30.7 | ▲39.2 | | ▼42.5 | ▼36.7 | | ▼10.7 | | ▼38.7 | ▼45.2 | | | | | | (Note: UPN operated as the Navarrese branch of the PP) | ▼17.3 | |
| PP | 2007 | ▼37.7 | ▲41.2 | ▼31.5 | ▲31.1 | ▲41.5 | ▼24.0 | ▼41.5 | ▲42.4 | ▲49.2 | ▼10.7 | ▲**65.2** | ▼38.7 | ▼45.2 | ▲46.0 | ▲48.8 | ▲**53.3** | ▲**56.0** | ▲58.3 | (Note: UPN operated as the Navarrese branch of the PP) | ▼17.3 | ▲**52.5** |
| PP | 2008 | ▲39.9 | ▲41.2 | ▲38.5 | ▲31.1 | ▲41.5 | | ▼41.5 | ▲42.4 | | ▼10.7 | | ▼38.7 | ▼45.2 | ▲46.0 | | | | | N/A | ▼17.3 | |
| PP | 2009 | ▲39.9 | ▲**42.1** | ▲38.5 | ▲31.1 | ▲41.5 | | ▼41.5 | ▲42.4 | | ▼10.7 | | ▼38.7 | ▲46.7 | ▲46.0 | | | | | N/A | ▼13.9 | |
| PP | 2010 | ▲39.9 | ▲**42.1** | ▲38.5 | ▲31.1 | ▲41.5 | | ▼41.5 | ▲42.4 | | ▲12.4 | | ▼38.7 | | ▲46.0 | | | | | N/A | ▼13.9 | |
| PP | 2011 | ▲**44.6** | ▲**42.1** | ▲38.5 | ▲**39.7** | ▲20.0 | ▲**32.2** | ▲**46.1** | ▲**48.1** | ▲51.6 | ▲12.4 | ▼65.2 | ▲**46.1** | | ▲46.4 | ▲**52.0** | ▼51.7 | ▼53.9 | ▲**58.8** | 7.3 | ▼13.9 | ▼49.4 |
| PP | 2012 | | ▲**42.1** | ▲40.7 | | ▲21.5 | ▲**32.2** | | | | ▲13.0 | | | ▼45.8 | | | | | | 7.3 | ▼11.6 | |
| PP | 2013 | | ▲**42.1** | ▲40.7 | | ▲21.5 | ▲**32.2** | | | | ▲13.0 | | | | | | | | | 7.3 | ▼11.6 | |
| PP | 2014 | | ▼26.1 | ▲40.7 | | ▲21.5 | ▲**32.2** | | | | ▲13.0 | | | | | | | | | 7.3 | ▼11.6 | |
| PP | 2015 | ▼28.7 | ▼26.1 | ▲26.7 | ▼27.5 | ▲21.6 | ▼18.6 | ▼32.6 | ▼37.5 | ▼37.7 | ▼8.5 | ▼45.7 | ▼37.0 | | ▼28.5 | ▼38.6 | ▼33.1 | ▼42.7 | ▼37.4 | ▼3.9 | ▼11.6 | ▼26.6 |
| PP | 2016 | ▲33.0 | ▼26.1 | ▲26.7 | ▼27.5 | ▲21.6 | ▼18.6 | ▼32.6 | ▼37.5 | | ▼8.5 | | ▼37.0 | ▲47.6 | ▼28.5 | | | | | ▼3.9 | ▼10.1 | ▼26.6 |
| PP | 2017 | | ▼26.1 | ▲26.7 | ▼27.5 | ▲21.6 | ▼18.6 | ▼32.6 | ▼37.5 | | ▼4.2 | | ▼37.0 | | ▼28.5 | | | | | ▼3.9 | ▼10.1 | ▼26.6 |
| PP | 2018 | | ▼26.1 | ▼20.7 | ▼27.5 | ▲21.6 | ▼18.6 | ▼32.6 | ▼37.5 | | ▼4.2 | | ▼37.0 | | ▼28.5 | | | | | ▼3.9 | ▼10.1 | ▼26.6 |
| PP | 2019 | ▼16.7 | ▼20.2 | | ▼20.9 | ▼17.5 | ▼15.2 | ▼24.0 | ▼28.5 | ▼31.5 | ▼4.2 | ▼31.1 | ▼27.5 | | ▼22.2 | ▼33.1 | ▼22.2 | ▼37.8 | ▼32.4 | (Note: Within Navarra Suma.) | ▼10.1 | ▼19.1 |
| PP | 2019 | ▲20.8 | ▼20.2 | | ▼20.9 | ▼17.5 | ▼15.2 | ▼24.0 | ▼28.5 | | ▼4.2 | | ▼27.5 | | ▼22.2 | ▼33.1 | | ▼37.8 | | (Note: Within Navarra Suma.) | ▼10.1 | ▼19.1 |
| PP | 2020 | | ▼20.2 | | ▼20.9 | ▼17.5 | ▼15.2 | ▼24.0 | ▼28.5 | | ▼4.2 | | ▼27.5 | ▲48.0 | ▼22.2 | ▼33.1 | | ▼37.8 | | (Note: Within Navarra Suma.) | (Note: Within PP+Cs.) | ▼19.1 |
| PP | 2021 | | ▼20.2 | | ▼20.9 | ▼17.5 | ▼15.2 | ▼24.0 | ▼28.5 | | ▼3.8 | | ▼27.5 | | ▼22.2 | ▼33.1 | ▲44.8 | ▼37.8 | | (Note: Within Navarra Suma.) | (Note: Within PP+Cs.) | ▼19.1 |
| PP | 2022 | | ▼20.2 | ▲**43.1** | ▼20.9 | ▼17.5 | ▼15.2 | ▼24.0 | ▼28.5 | ▼31.4 | ▼3.8 | | ▼27.5 | | ▼22.2 | ▼33.1 | | ▼37.8 | | (Note: Within Navarra Suma.) | (Note: Within PP+Cs.) | ▼19.1 |
| PP | 2023 | ▲33.1 | ▼20.2 | | ▲35.5 | ▲32.6 | ▲19.3 | ▲35.8 | ▲33.7 | | ▼3.8 | ▲34.3 | ▲38.8 | | ▲35.8 | ▲45.4 | ▲47.3 | ▲52.6 | ▲42.8 | ▲7.3 | (Note: Within PP+Cs.) | ▲35.7 |
| PP | 2024 | ▲33.1 | ▲34.2 | | | ▲32.6 | | | ▲33.7 | | ▲11.0 | | | ▼47.4 | | | | | | ▲7.3 | 9.2 | |
| PP | 2025 | ▲33.1 | ▲34.2 | | | ▲32.6 | | | ▲33.7 | | ▲11.0 | | | | | | | | | ▲7.3 | 9.2 | |
| PP | 2026 | ▲33.1 | ▲34.2 | ▼41.6 | ▼34.2 | ▲32.6 | | | ▲33.7 | ▲35.4 | ▲11.0 | | ▲43.1 | | | | | | | ▲7.3 | 9.2 | |
| Party | Year | (Spain) ES | (European Union) EU | (Andalusia) AN | (Aragon) AR | (Asturias) AS | (Canary Islands) CN | (Cantabria) CB | (Castilla–La Mancha) CM | (Castile and León) CL | (Catalonia) CT | (Ceuta) CE | (Extremadura) EX | (Galicia (Spain)) GL | (Balearic Islands) IB | RI | (Community of Madrid) MD | (Melilla) ML | (Region of Murcia) MC | (Navarre) NC | (Basque Country (autonomous community)) PV | (Valencian Community) CV |
**Bold** indicates best result to date. To be decided Present in legislature (in opposition); Junior coalition partner Senior coalition partner

== See also ==
- List of political parties in Spain
- Politics of Spain
