= The Hand (Botero) =

Bronze sculpture by Fernando Botero on display in Madrid since 1994

Coordinates: 40°26′28″N 3°41′30″W

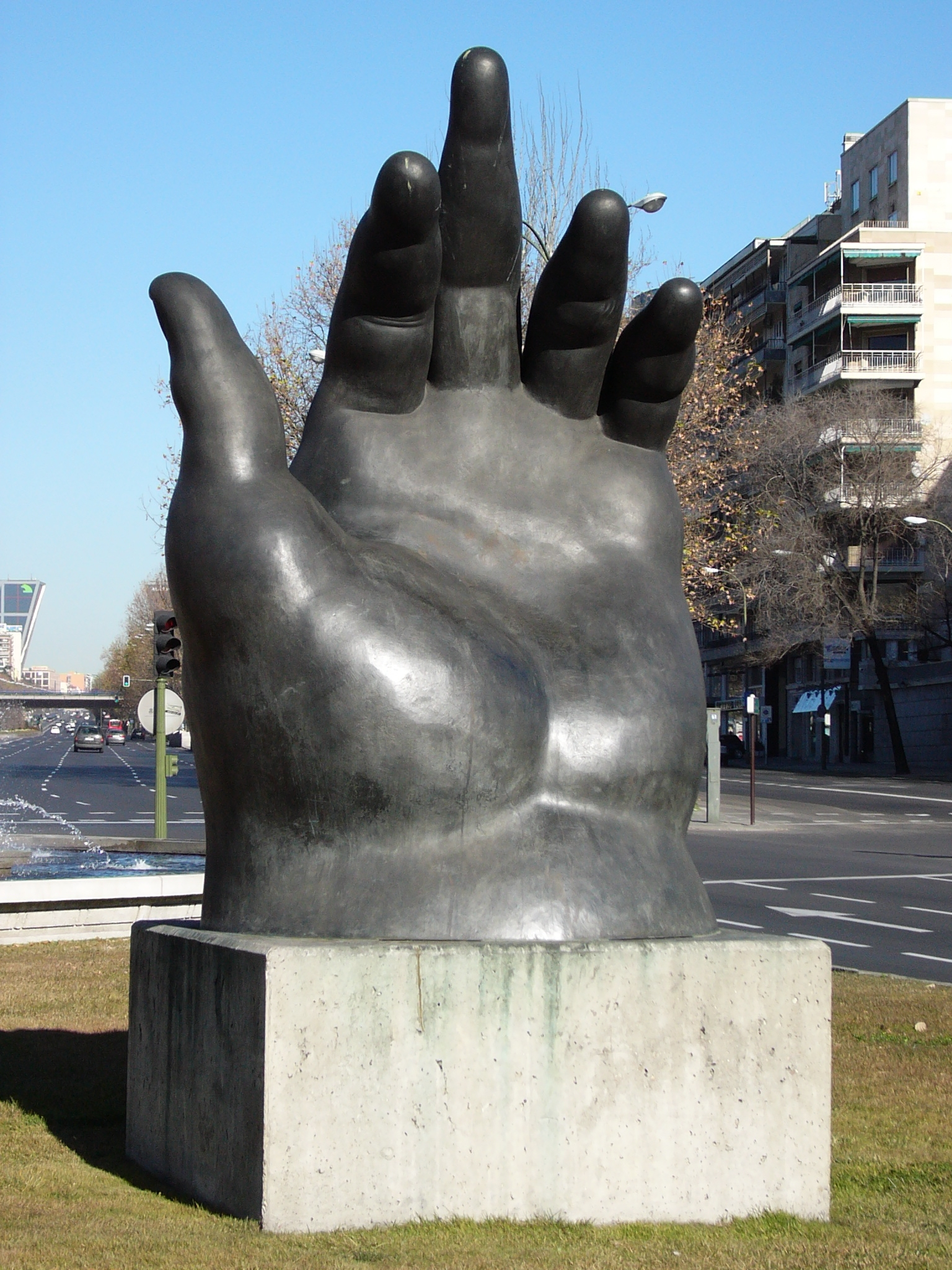
The Hand (1994) by Fernando Botero

The Hand (Spanish: La mano) is a bronze sculpture by the Colombian sculptor Fernando Botero. Since 1994, it has been on public display in Madrid, Spain. The 500 kilogram hand is of a plump form, a trademark of the sculptor.

The sculpture was one of twenty-one exhibits in a 1994 exhibition of Botero's work. After a public vote, Woman with Mirror was the sculpture that received the most votes and was gifted to the city by the artist. Madrid treasurer Fernando López Amor urged corporations to purchase other works and put them on public display. The Hand was bought by Telefónica in October 1994, for 70 million Spanish pesetas (around €420,000). Its matte finish made it more suitable than other exhibits for permanent outside display. A third Botero piece, Raptio of Europa, was installed at Madrid–Barajas Airport.

In April 1995, Telefónica loaned the sculpture to the city and it was installed on Paseo de la Castellana. El País reported that its position seemed to point towards the Equestrian statue of Francisco Franco which then stood in the Plaza de San Juan de la Cruz.
