= Teodoro García Egea =

Spanish politician (born 1985)

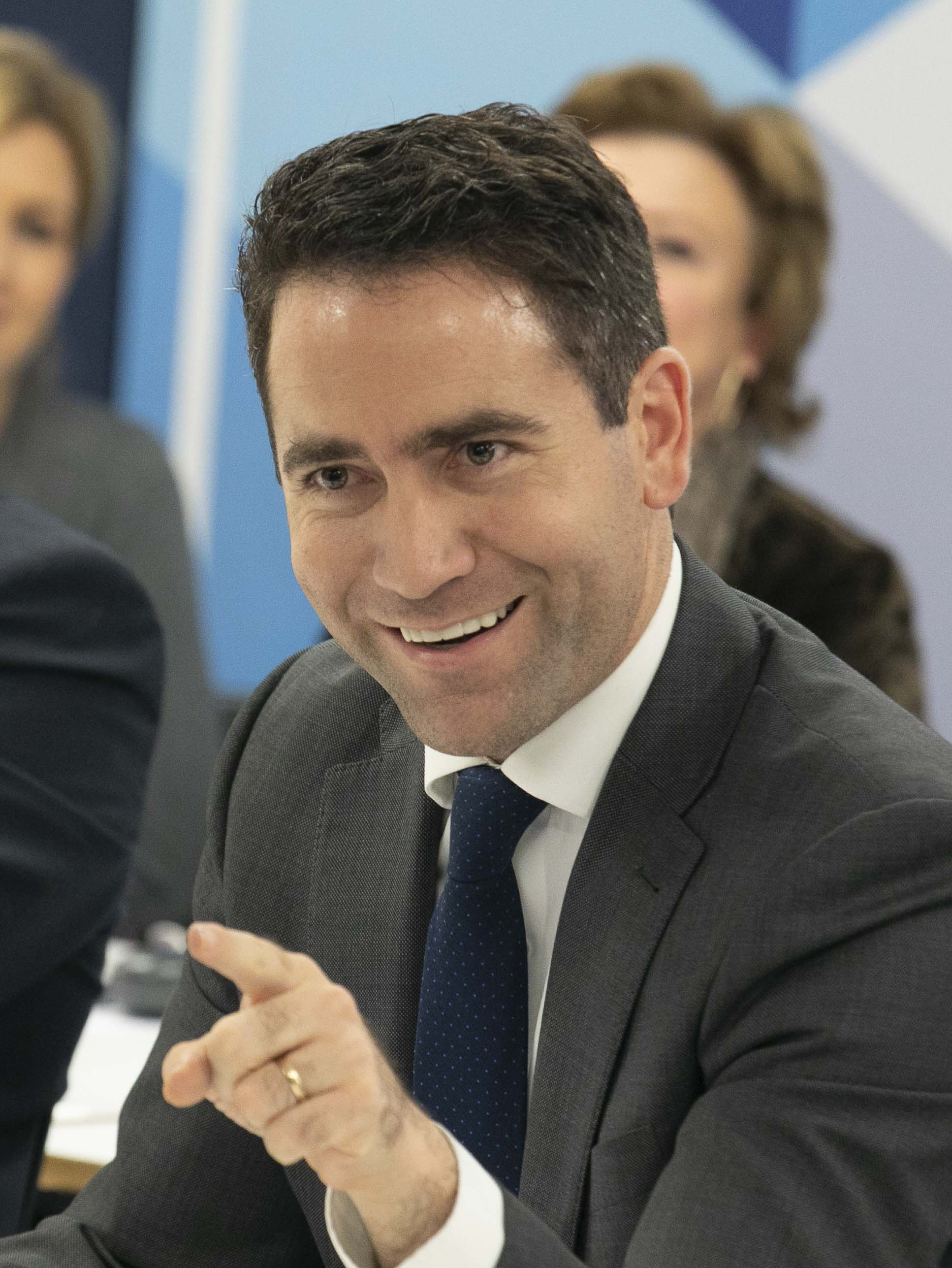

Secretary-General of the People's Party
- In office 26 July 2018 – 22 February 2022
- President: Pablo Casado
- Preceded by: María Dolores de Cospedal
- Succeeded by: Cuca Gamarra

Member of the Congress of Deputies
- In office 19 January 2012 – 17 March 2023
- Constituency: Murcia

Member of the Cieza City Council
- In office 16 June 2007 – 23 May 2009
- Constituency: At-large

Personal details
- Born: 27 January 1985 (age 41) Cieza, Murcia, Spain
- Party: People's Party
- Spouse: María José Escasaín
- Education: Polytechnic University of Cartagena
- Occupation: Politician, engineer

Teodoro García Egea (born 27 January 1985) is a Spanish politician. He was the secretary-general of the People's Party, second to President Pablo Casado in party hierarchy. He has been a member of the 10th, 11th, 12th and 13th terms of the Congress of Deputies representing Murcia.

== Early life and education ==
Teodoro or "Teo" (as he is often hypocoristically known by) García Egea was born on 27 January 1985 in Cieza, Region of Murcia. While still pursuing his graduate studies as a Telecommunications Engineer, he was elected municipal councillor in Cieza, serving in that capacity from 2007 to 2009. A participant in the 2008 Mollar Chafá olive pit spitting competition in his native city, he won and was proclaimed the World Champion in the speciality, reaching 16.84 m. (Note: Partakers spit an olive bone as far as possible, winning the competitor reaching the longest horizontal distance.) After completing his degree in Telecommunications Engineering at the Universidad Politécnica de Cartagena (UPCT), he began his postgraduate studies, initially at the University of Maryland.

García Egea earned a PhD in Robotics at the UPCT, with the reading of a dissertation titled Análisis, decodificación y clasificación de la señal EEG en entornos tridimensionales in December 2015.

== Political career ==
García Egea ranked 9th on the People's Party (PP) list for the constituency of Murcia vis-à-vis in the November 2011 Congress of Deputies election. In a crushing PP victory in the staunchly conservative constituency that delivered a 64.22% of valid votes to the party, the PP obtained 8 seats out of a total of 10. With 1 seat in the PP list short of becoming MP, García Egea nonetheless became a legislator of the 10th Lower House on 19 January 2012, covering the vacant seat left by Jaime García-Legaz, who had been appointed Secretary of State for Trade.

García Egea was re-elected to his seat in the Congress of Deputies in the 2015 and 2016 general elections, in which García Egea ran 1st in the PP list for Murcia. Following the announcement of Mariano Rajoy's resignation as President of the PP in June 2018, he worked for Pablo Casado, a prospective candidate to become leader of the party, assisting him as campaign director. Casado was elected President of the PP among the party delegates in a second round of voting, and soon after, Casado appointed García Egea as the Secretary-General of the party.

He renovated his seat for the 13th term of the Congress of Deputies in the 2019 general election.

== Personal life ==
In March 2012, García Egea married María José Escasaín, a chemical engineer, whom he had been dating 5 years.

== Notes ==
Party political offices
Preceded by María Dolores de Cospedal	Secretary-General of the People's Party; 2018–2022	Succeeded by Cuca Gamarra
