= Calle de Génova =

Street in Madrid, Spain

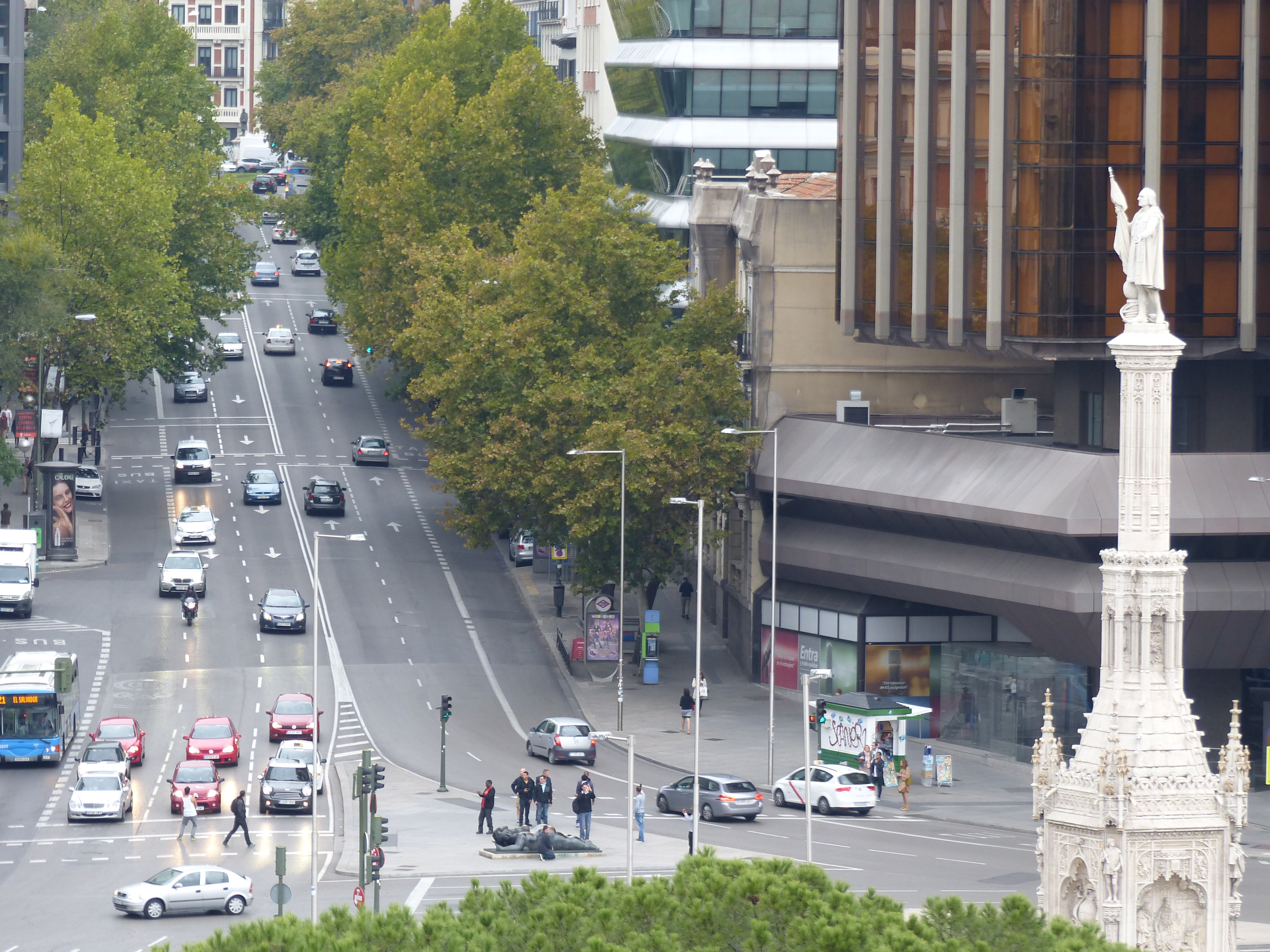
Calle de Génova as viewed from the Plaza de Colón. The Torres de Colón dominate the right of the photograph, while the sculpture Woman with Mirror can be seen on the pedestrian island at the end of the road.

The Calle de Génova is a street in Madrid, Spain. It is the dividing line between the neighbourhoods of Justicia and Almagro, in the respective districts of Centro and Chamberí. It runs from the Plaza de Alonso Martínez to the Plaza de Colón.

== Name ==
The street was called the Ronda de Santa Bárbara until 1859 and the Ronda de Recoletos until 1 October 1886, when the City Council of Madrid renamed it after Genoa, the birthplace of Christopher Columbus, whose name is carried by the square at its end.

== Features ==
Historically, the street was in the outskirts of the city between two entrance gates erected in the 18th century: the Puerta de Santa Bárbara and the Puerta de Alcalá, of which only the latter remains. Up until the 20th century, it had many convents and palaces.

The street is now known for the headquarters of the People's Party, resident at number 13 since 1983, when the party was the People's Alliance. The building, at the corner with the Calle de Zurbano, was formerly the Palace of the Marquises of Bedmar. "Génova" is used as a metonym by the Spanish media for the national leadership of the party.

In September 2015, the seat of the Audiencia Nacional national court was opened at Calle Génova, though its official address is through the entry door at 1 Calle García Gutiérrez.

There is a plaque at number 24 to mark the birthplace in 1903 of José Antonio Primo de Rivera, founder of Falangism. At number 26, there is the Palacio de Gamazo, an 1888 work by Ricardo Velázquez Bosco that is classed as a Bien de Interés Cultural.

Twin skyscrapers designed by Antonio Lamela and finished in 1976, the Torres de Colón are at number 31, at the corner with the Paseo de la Castellana near the Plaza de Colón. José Luis Sánchez Fernández's sculpture Herón is situated outside, and in an island halfway across the road is Woman with Mirror, donated by Fernando Botero as the most popular piece from his 1994 exhibit.

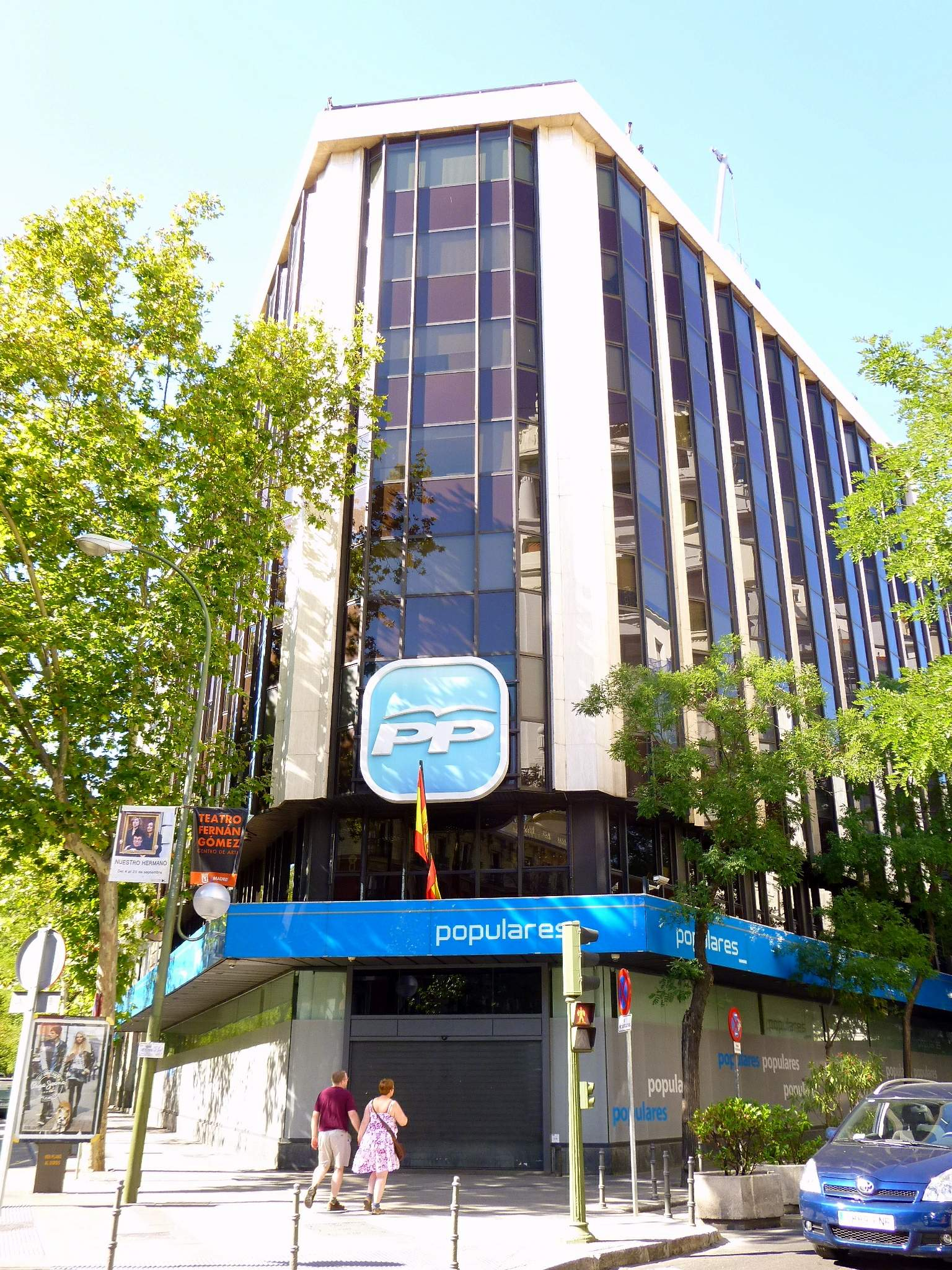
Headquarters of the People's Party

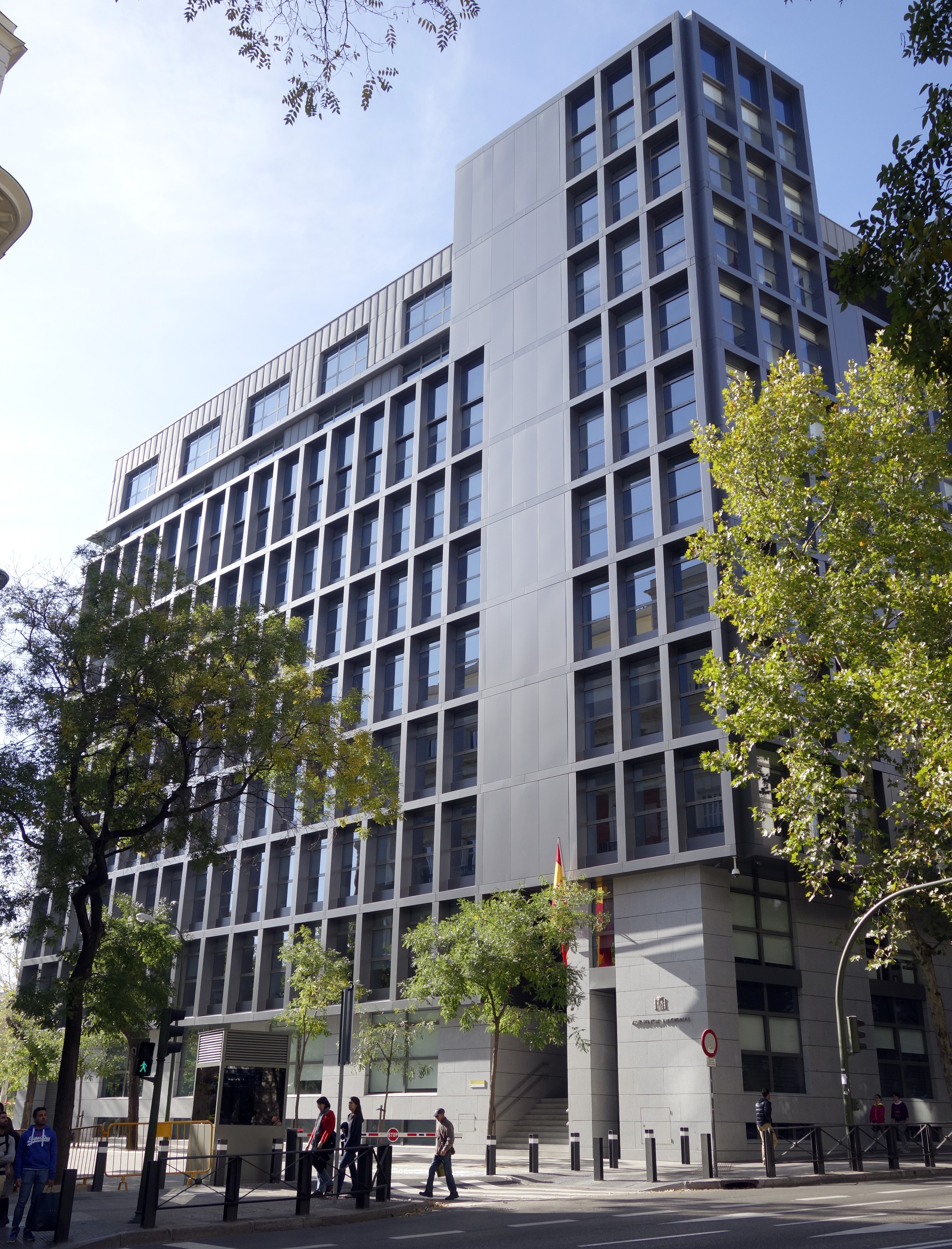
Audiencia Nacional

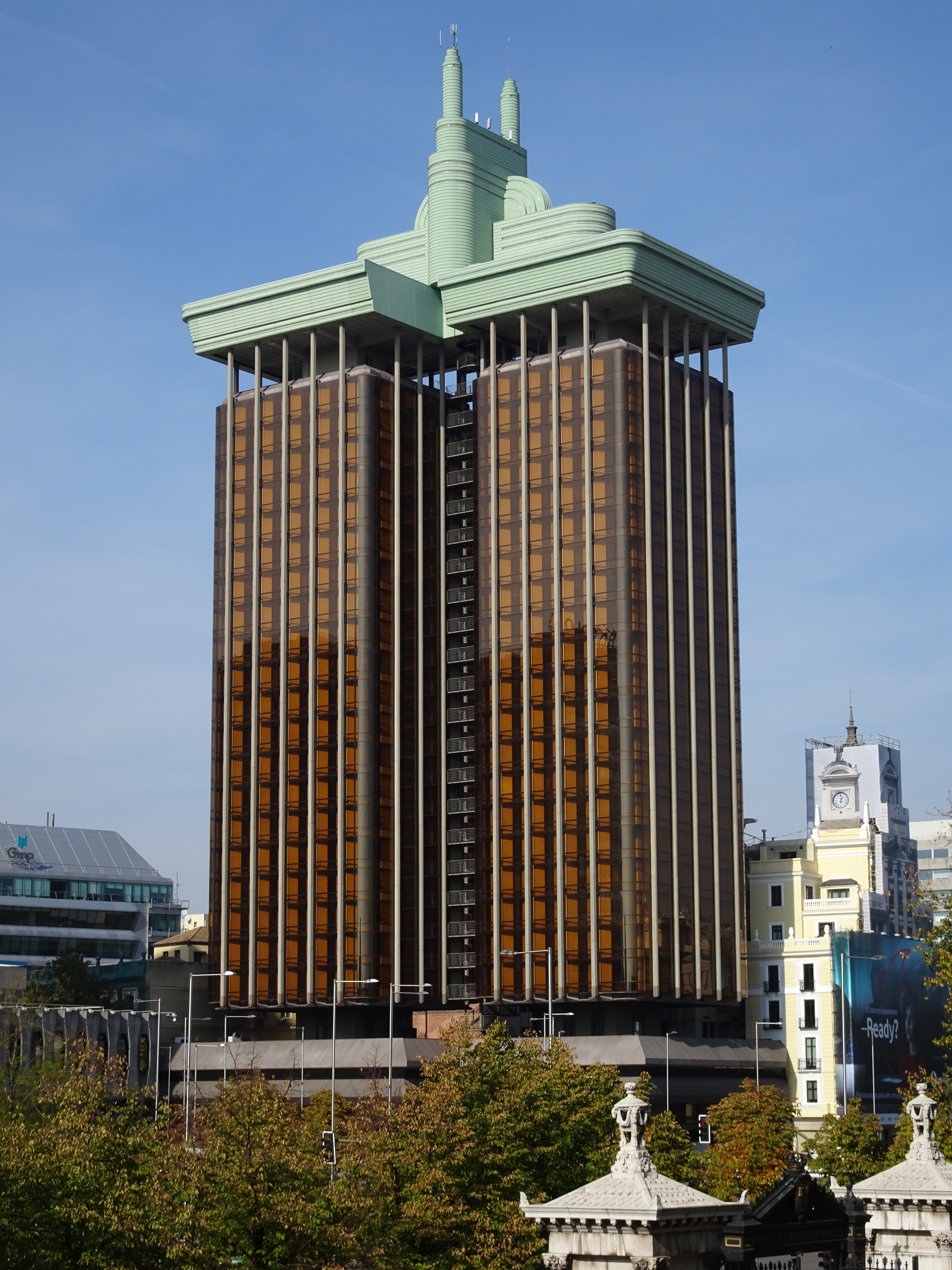
Torres de Colón

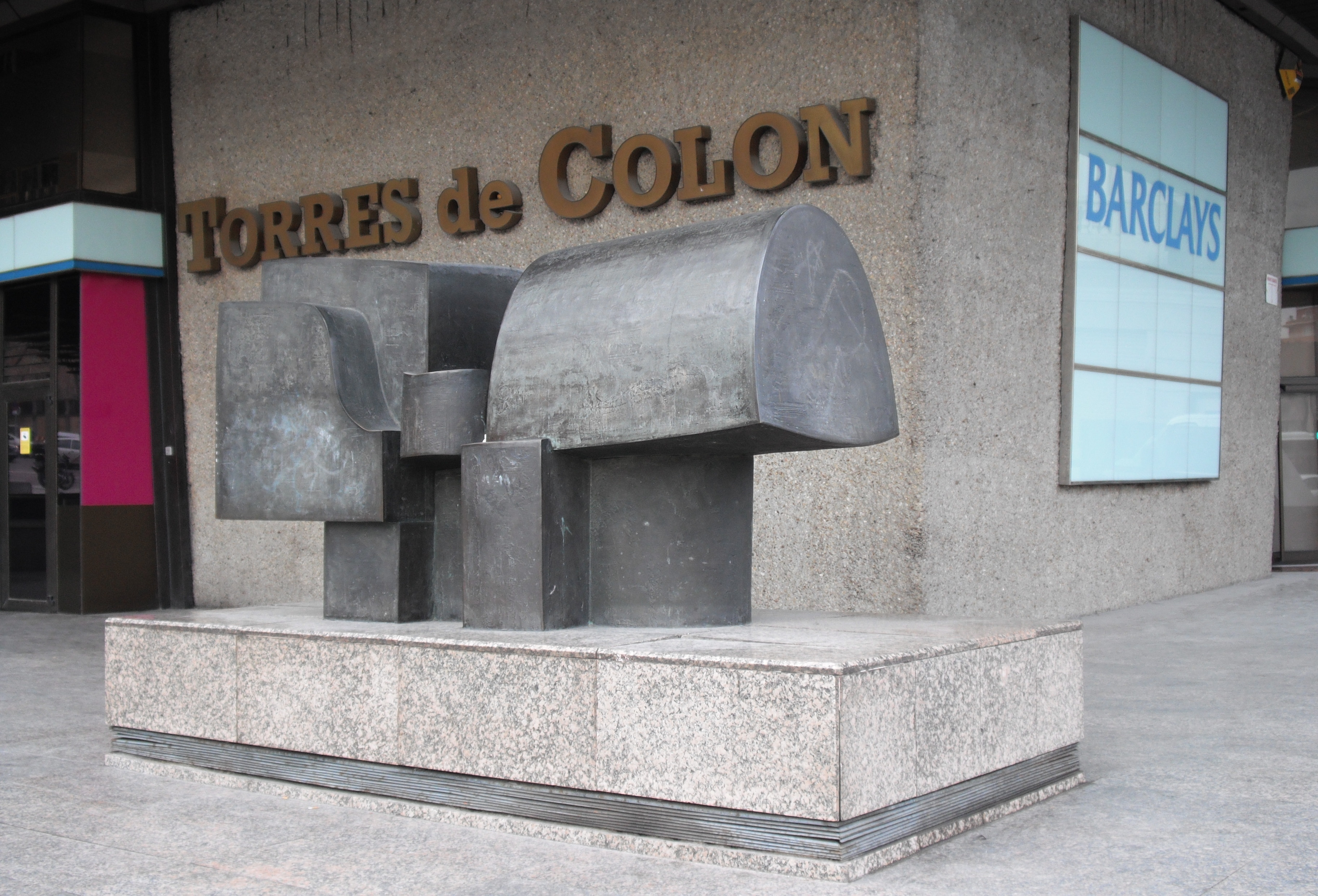
Herón

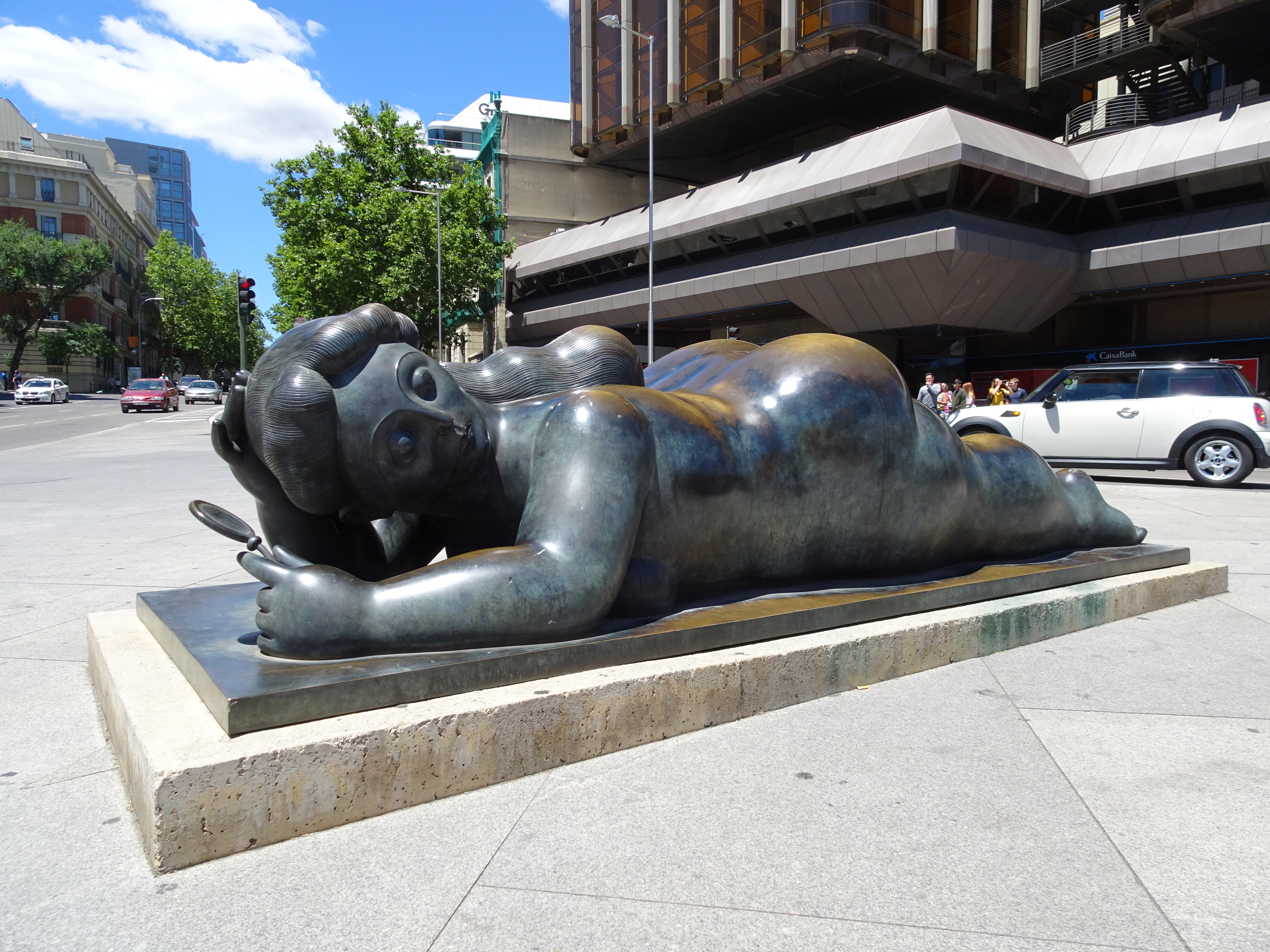
Woman with Mirror
