= Miguel Tellado =

Spanish politician (born 1974)

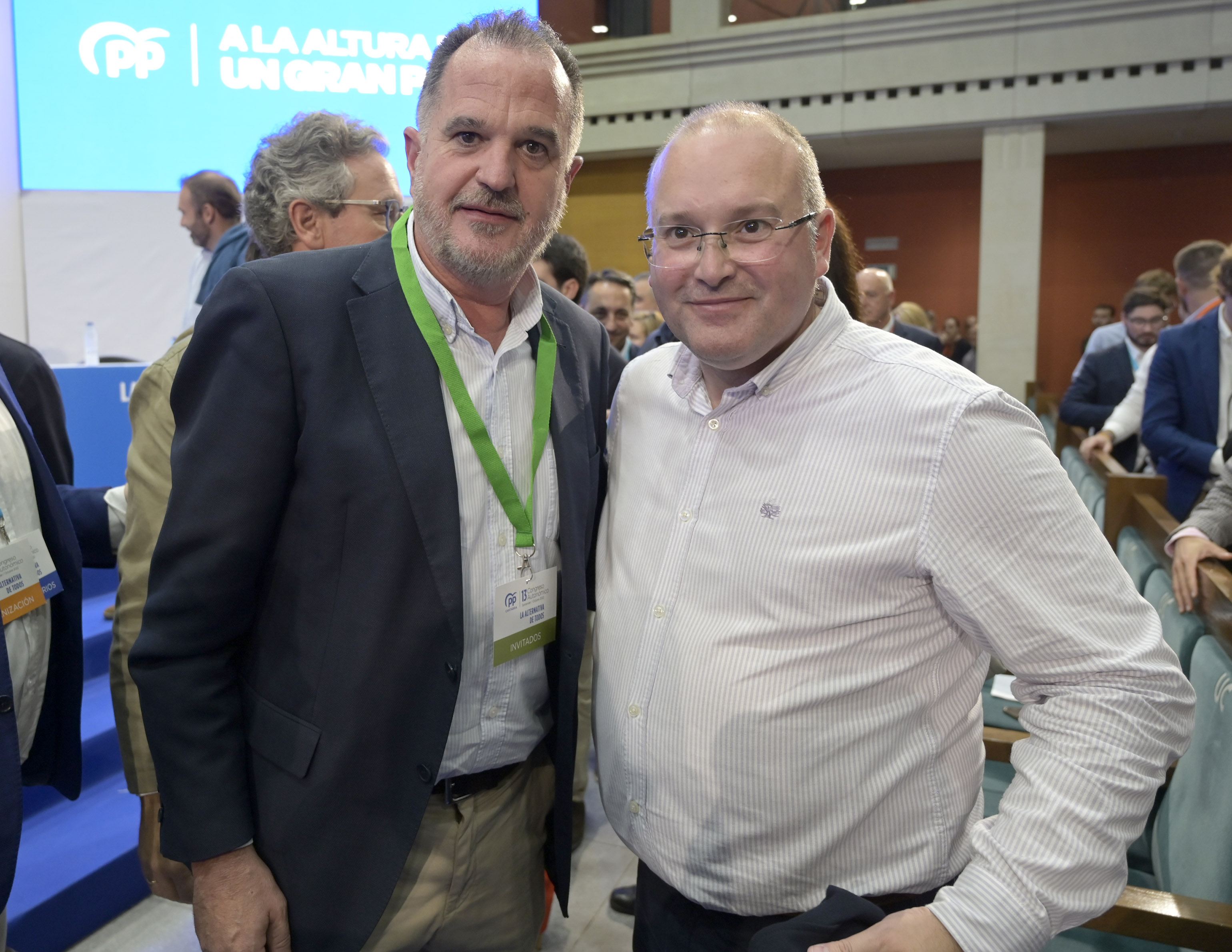
- Tellado in 2022

Member of the Congress of Deputies
- Incumbent
- Assumed office 17 August 2023
- Constituency: A Coruña

Member of the Senate
- In office 25 May 2022 – 17 August 2023
- Appointed by: Parliament of Galicia
- Preceded by: Juan Carlos Serrano López

Personal details
- Born: 21 February 1974 (age 52)
- Party: People's Party

Miguel Ángel Tellado Filgueira (born 21 February 1974) is a Spanish politician serving as a member of the Congress of Deputies since 2023. From 2022 to 2023, he was a member of the Senate.
