= Leonardo Fernández Troyano =

Spanish engineer, architect, & author (born 1938)

- Born: July 9, 1938 (age 87); Madrid, Spain
- Notable work: Tirantes Bridge; Ria Bridge
- Title: Engineer
- Father: Engineer Carlos Fernández Casado Bridge

Leonardo Fernández Troyano ( July 9, 1938, Madrid, Spain) is a Spanish engineer, architect and author. He is the co-chair of CFCSL.

== Biography ==
Leonardo Fernández Troyano is the son to Carlos Fernández Casado and Rita María Troyano de los Ríos. He studied at the School of Civil Engineers, Canals and Ports of Madrid, being part of the class of 1963. He obtained his doctorate in 1965. Starting in December 1963, he worked with his father in his engineering office. In 1966, he co-founded Carlos Fernández Casado, SL, together with his father and Javier Manterola.

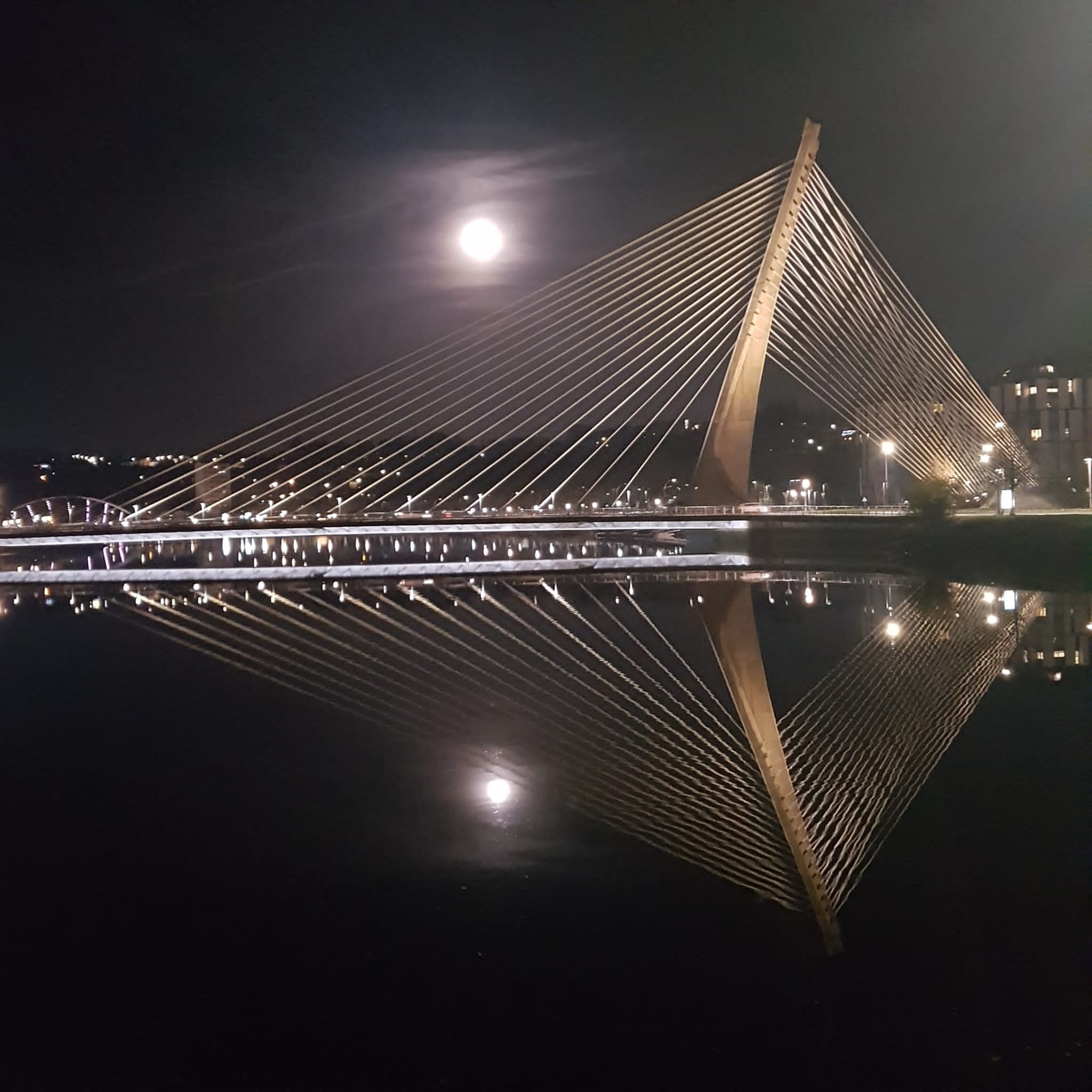
Tirantes bridge at night in 2022

Between the years 1968 to 1975, he was a professor and taught "Factory Bridges." From 1977 to 1980, he taught the doctoral subject "Crystal-stayed Bridges" at the School of Civil Engineers, Canals and Ports of Madrid.

== Publications ==
- Fernández Troyano, Leonardo (1999). Land on water. Universal historical vision of bridges. Madrid: College of Civil, Canal and Port Engineers. ISBN 84-380-0148-3
- Interventions on stone bridges, p. 42-49, Engineering and Territory, nº92, 2011
- Procedures for the construction of wide concrete arches, ARCH'04
- The historical steps of the Sierra de Guadarrama, Ediciones La Librería, 2015. ISBN 978-84-9873-280-1
- I walk the river soberly, Post Office. ISBN 978-84-88841-30-8
- With Javier Manterola Amisén, Carlos Fernández Casado, Esteyco Foundation. ISBN 978-84-921092-2-7
- With Amaya Sáenz Sanz, Bridges: materials, structures and heritage, p. 451-498, published under the direction of Manuel Silva Suárez, in Technique and engineering in Spain - VI: The Eighteenth Century: from languages to heritage, Royal Academy of Engineering, Institution «Fernando el Católico,» University Presses of Zaragoza, Zaragoza, 2011. ISBN 978-84-9911-151-3
- With Lucía Fernández Muñoz, The Etxebarri Bridge, III Ache Congress of Bridges and Structures

== Awards ==
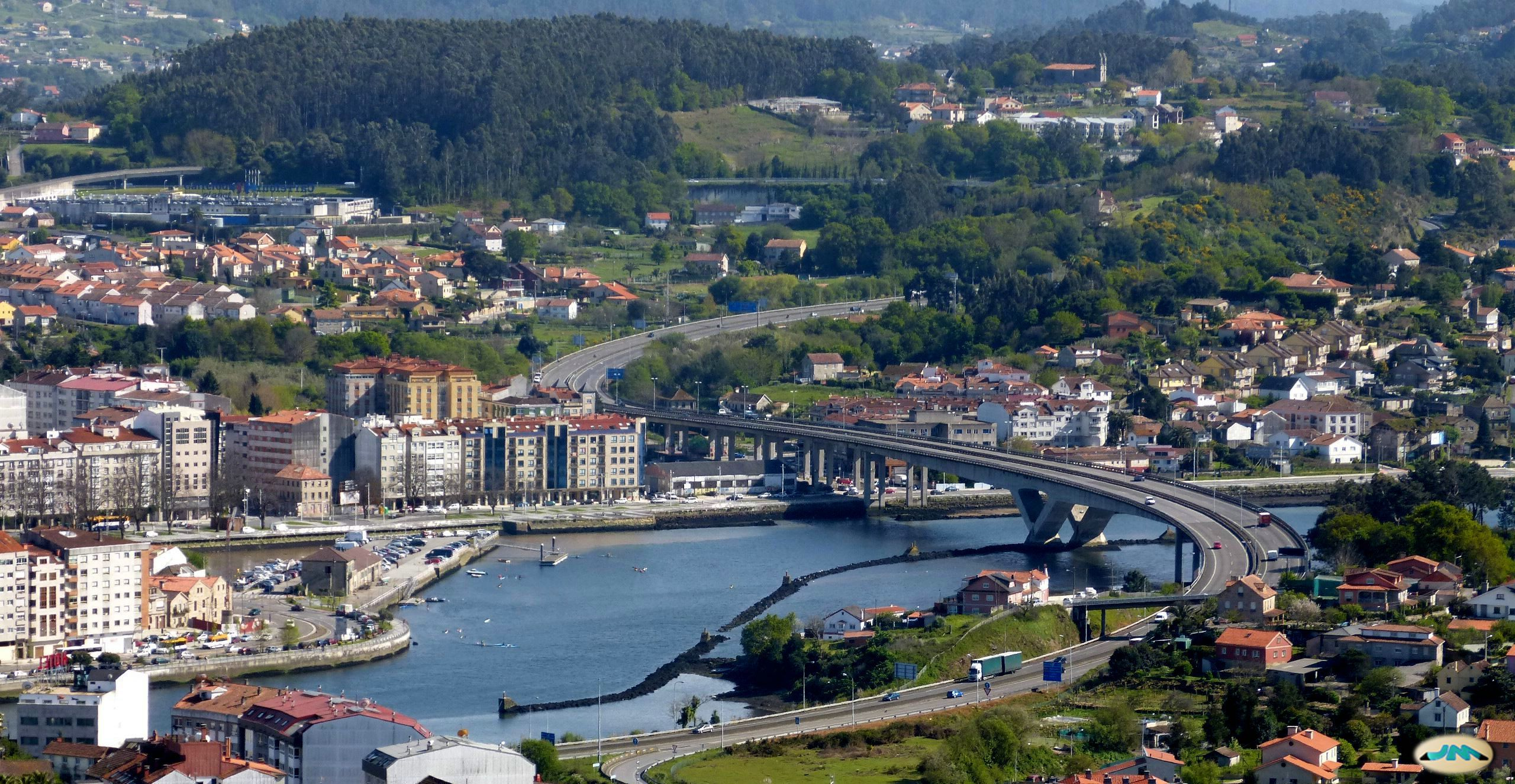
Ria Bridge in Pontevedra

In 2009, Leonardo won Santo Domingo de la Calzada Awards.
