= Ria Bridge =

Rigid frame bridge with V-shaped legs in Pontevedra, Spain

Ria Bridge Puente de la Ría
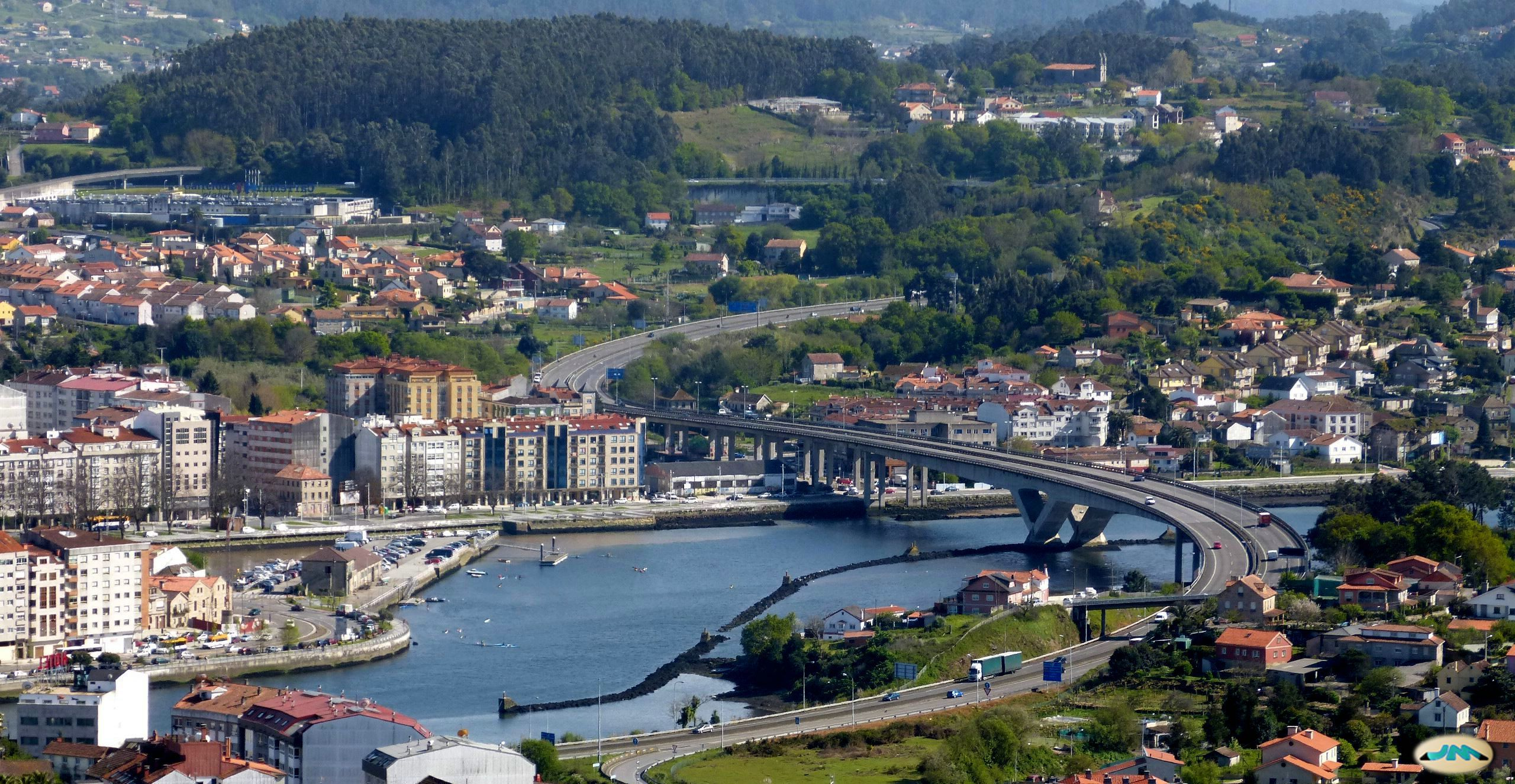
- Ria Bridge in Pontevedra
- Coordinates: 42.42639°N 8.65444°W
- Carries: Motor vehicles
- Crosses: Ria de Pontevedra, Lérez River
- Locale: Pontevedra, Spain
- Official name: Ponte da Ría

Characteristics
- Design: Rigid-frame bridge, box girder bridge
- Material: Reinforced concrete Pre-stressed concrete
- Total length: 700 m (2,300 ft)
- Width: 25 m (82 ft)

History
- Construction start: 1989
- Construction end: 1992
- Opened: 25 March 1992

Statistics
- Daily traffic: 50,000 vehicles per day
- Toll: No

The Ria Bridge is a rigid frame bridge with V-shaped legs and a box girder road bridge that crosses the Ria de Pontevedra in the city of Pontevedra, Spain. It is part of the AP-9 motorway and opened in 1992.

== Location ==
The bridge is located between the Mollavao neighbourhood in Pontevedra and the place called A Puntada (in the neighbouring municipality of Poio). It is located in the western part of the city, which opens onto the sea, in the estuary formed by the mouth of the Lérez river in the ria de Pontevedra.

== History ==
Work on the bridge began on 21 December 1989 for the AP-9 motorway and as part of the city's western bypass.

It was designed by the engineers Leonardo Fernández Troyano, Javier Manterola Armisén and Amando López Padilla. Construction began with the central pier (the bridge's reference pier) and a construction method based on cantilever construction using temporary cable-stays. The bridge was inaugurated on 25 March 1992.

The construction and opening of the bridge was controversial because of its impact on the landscape and the significant change in the city's views to the sea. The name "Ria Bridge" was given to it by Audasa, the concessionary company of the AP-9 motorway.

== Description ==
It is a 700-metre long bridge with two independent carriageways, made of prestressed concrete for the deck and reinforced concrete for the piers and abutments.

It is a motorway bridge with twin V-shaped piers as the only intermediate support in its central part, whose foundations lie in the centre of the bed of the Ria de Pontevedra. It is divided into three different sections. The intermediate section has two main spans of 120 m in length with a box girder of variable depth. A seagull solution was adopted for the shape of the deck: it has a maximum flange on the central pier, which decreases towards the side piers of the 120-metre spans, reaching the minimum flange near them. The side spans of the bridge are 40 m long with a constant depth box girder. The spans at both ends of the bridge form the bridge access viaducts. The piers of the southern section of the viaduct pass over a small section of the Pontevedra seafront promenade.

The Ría bridge is toll-free and serves as a western bypass between the north and south of the city of Pontevedra, in the section between the O Pino neighbourhood and the fire station. Around 50,000 vehicles cross the bridge every day.

== Gallery ==
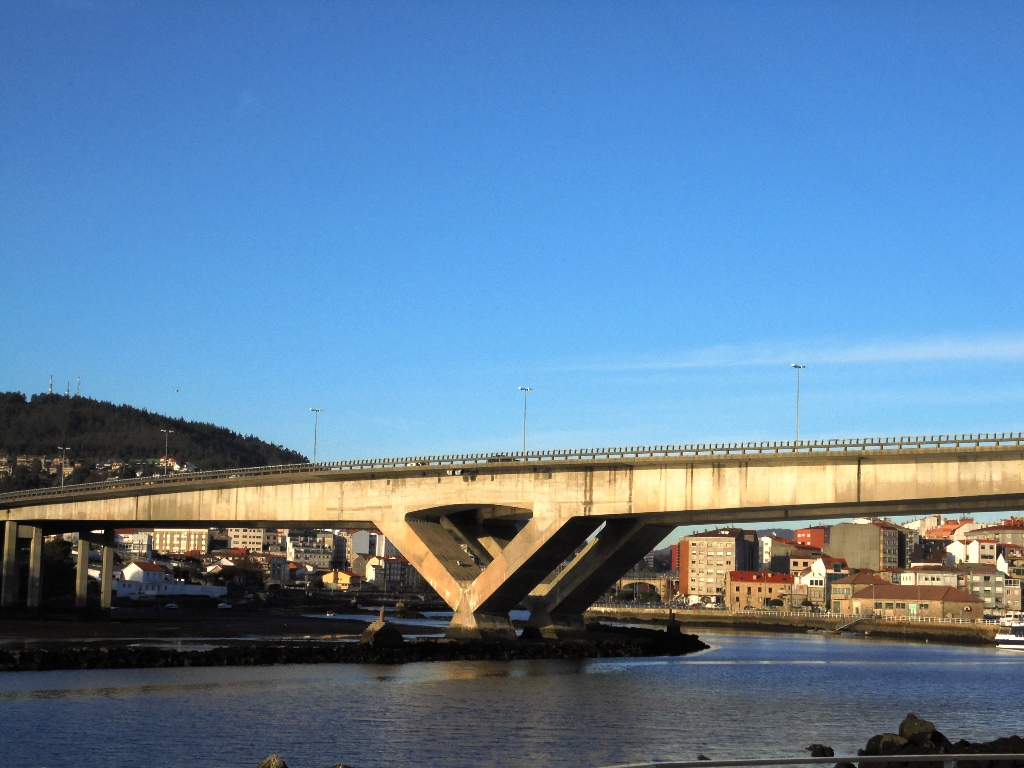
View of the bridge over the ria de Pontevedra

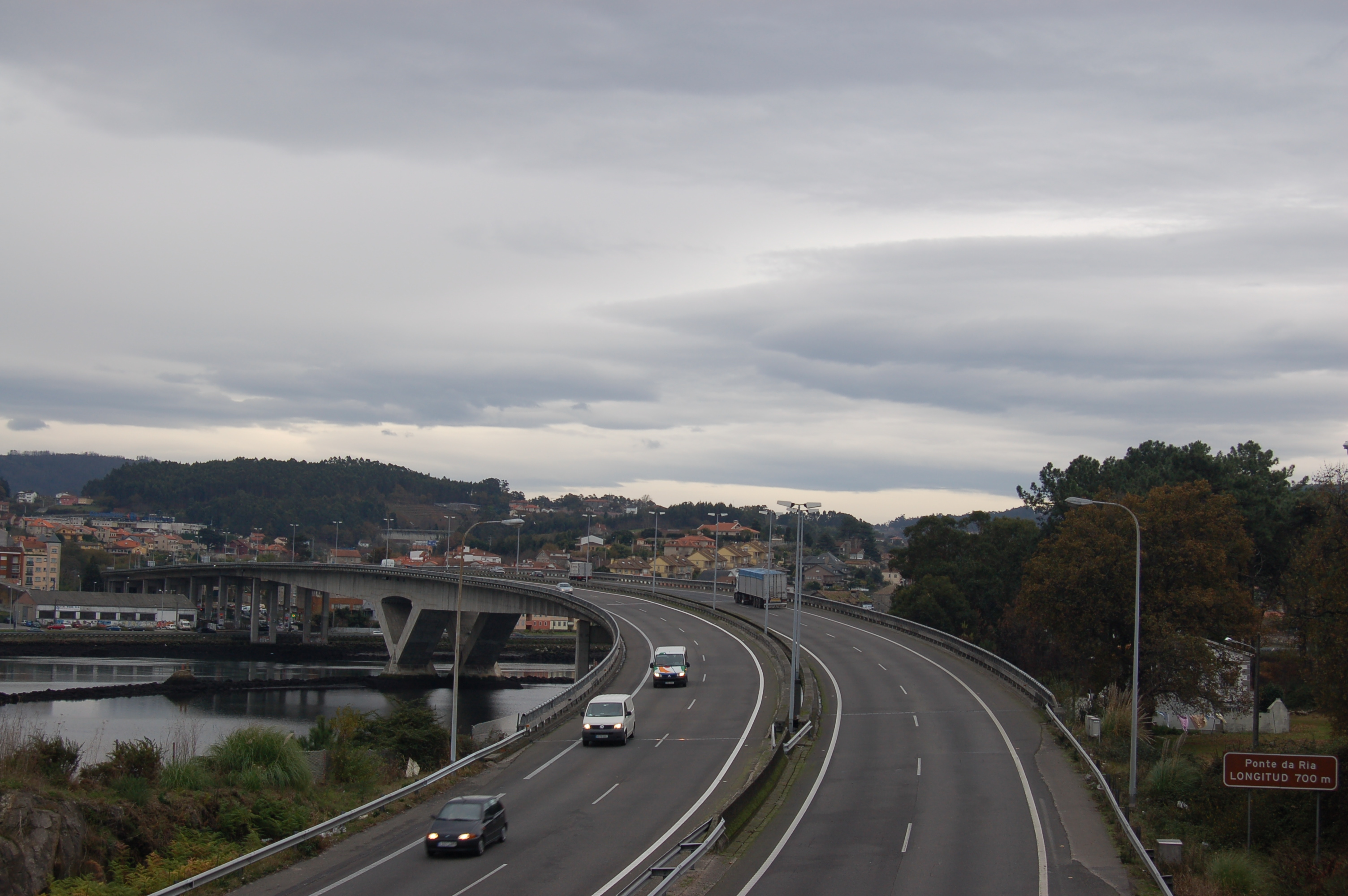
View of the bridge from the north towards the south with the official name sign

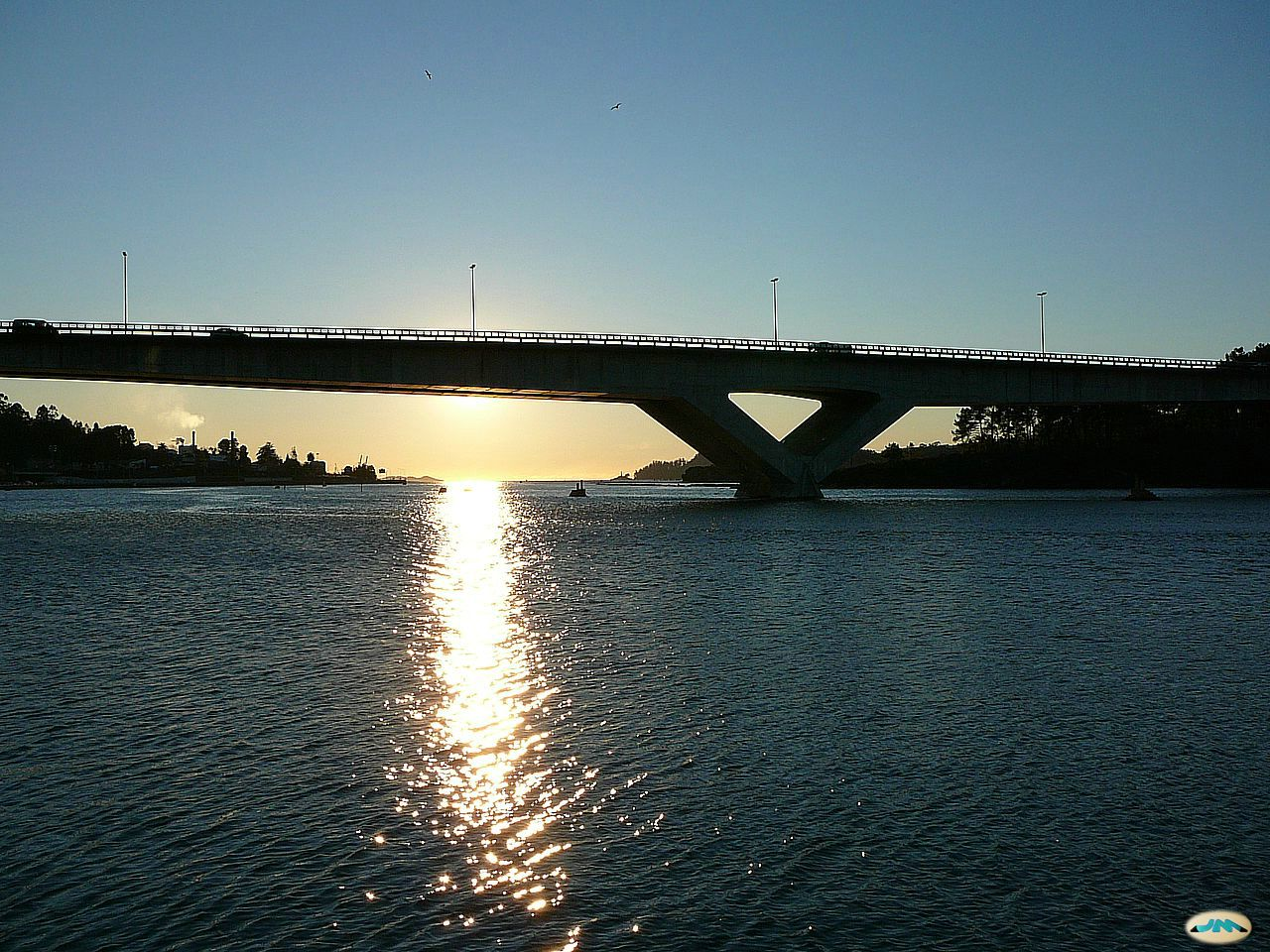
The bridge at sunset

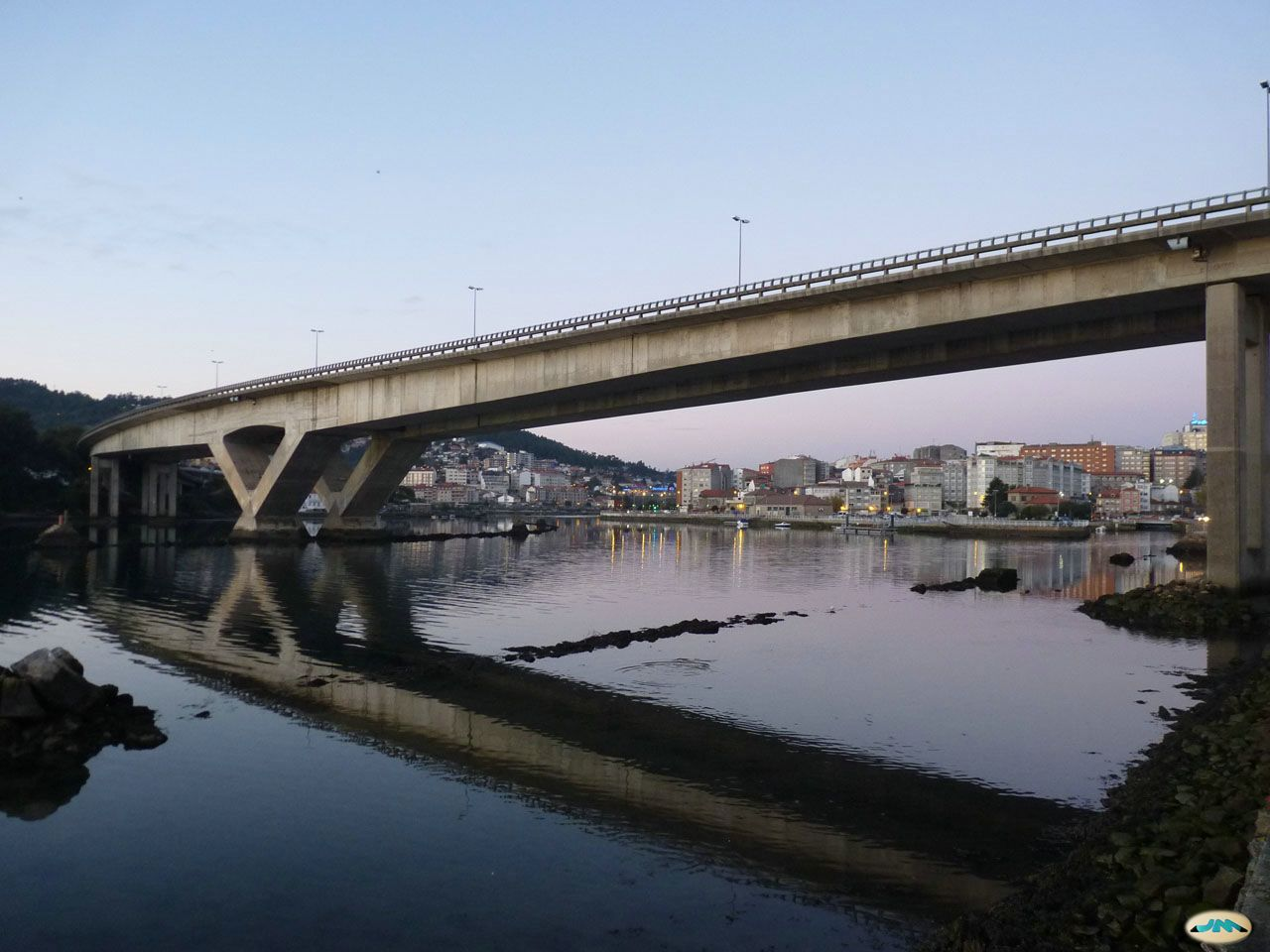
The bridge with the city in the background

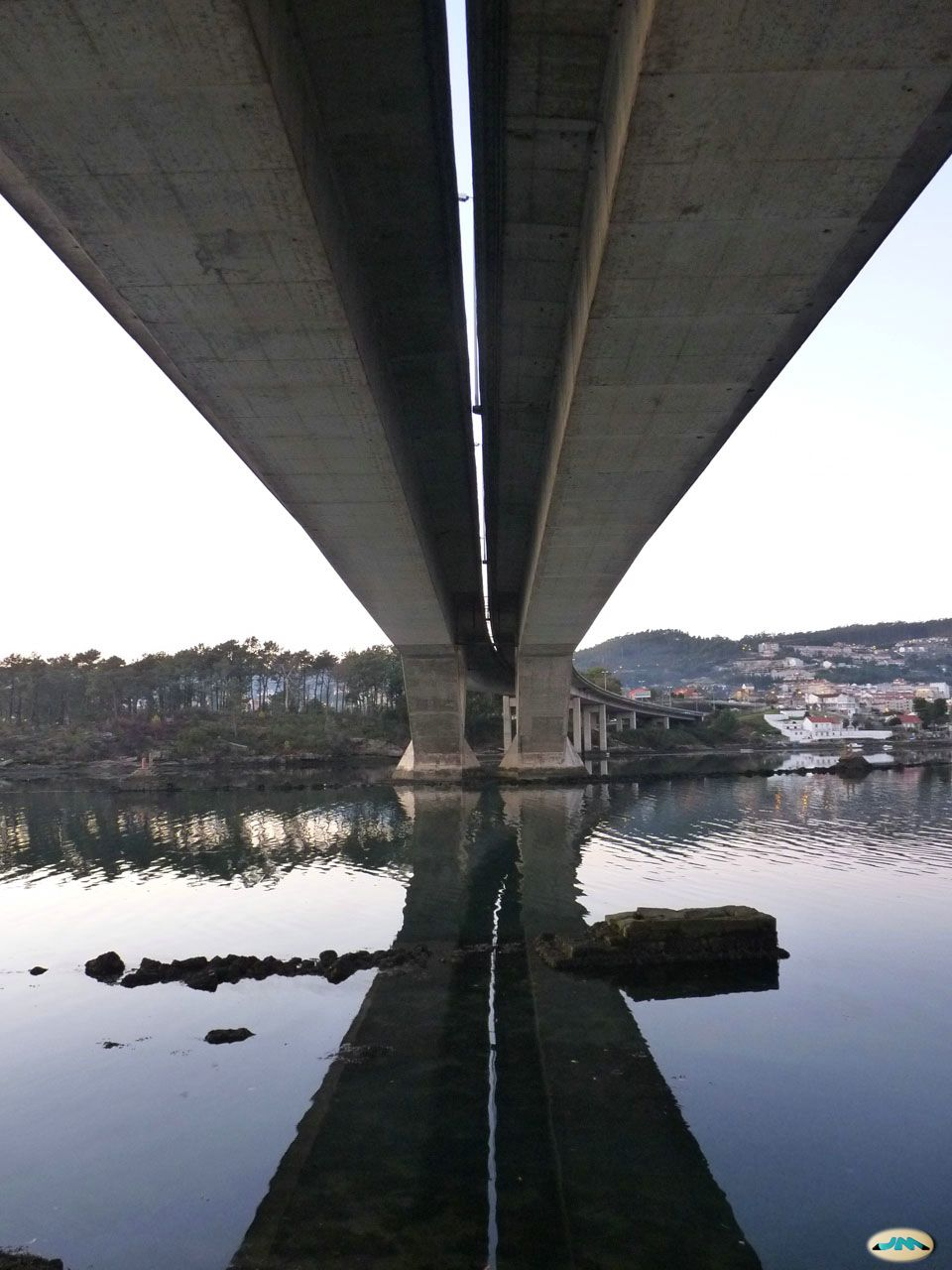
The two carriageways from under the bridge

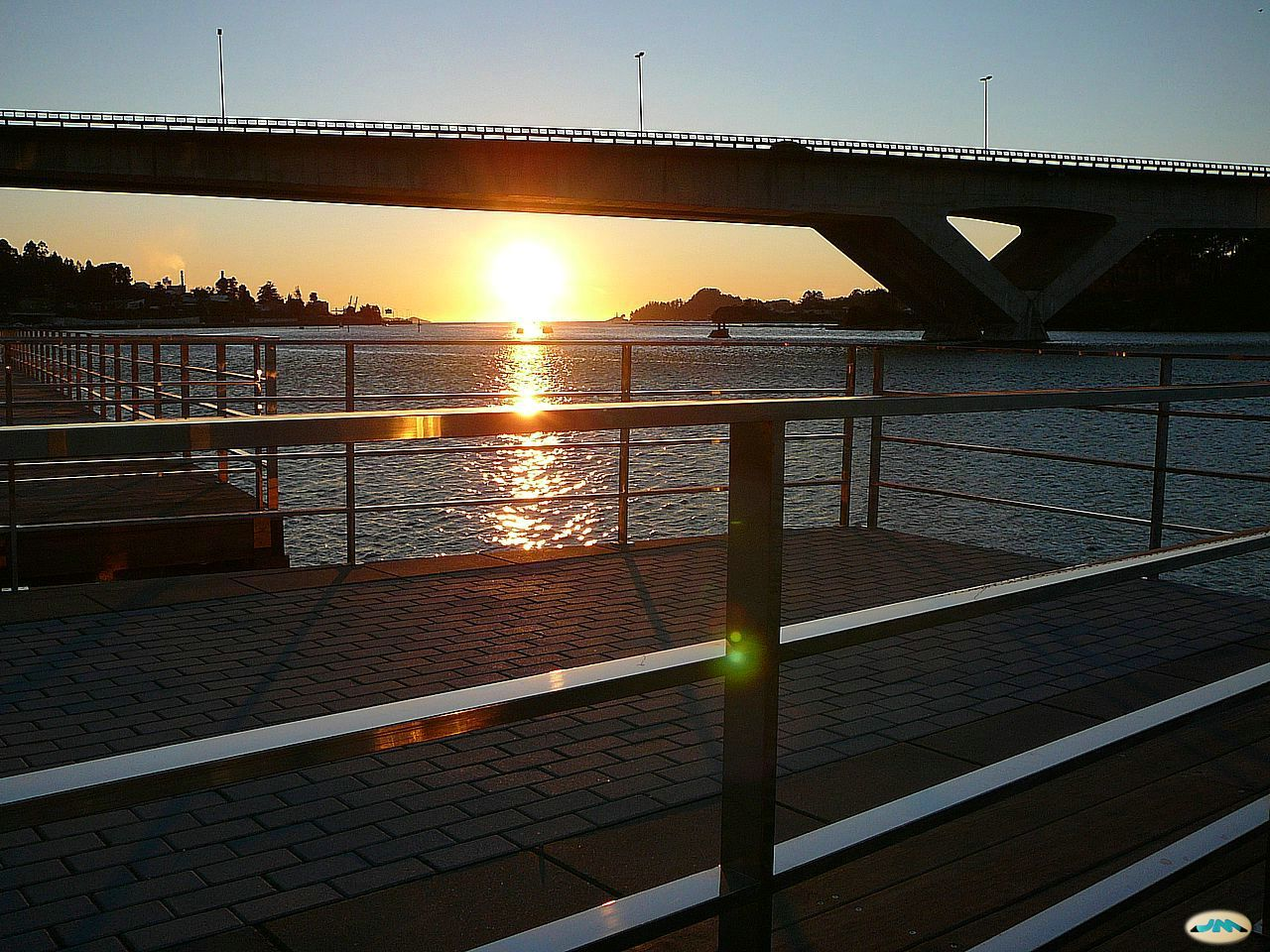
The bridge from the viewpoint of the Pontevedra waterfront

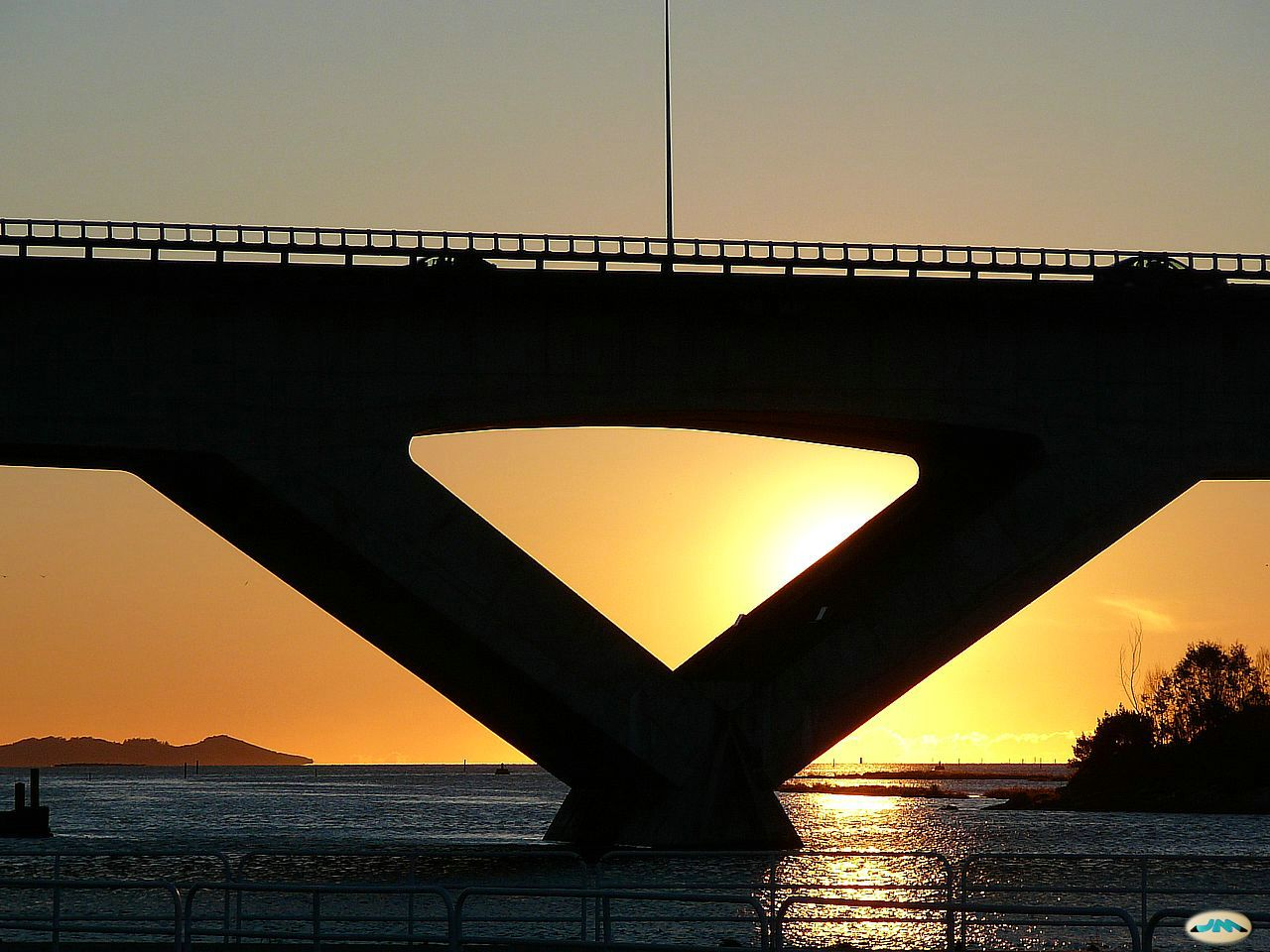
Central pier as the only V-shaped intermediate support

== See also ==
=== Bibliography ===
- Fernández Troyano, Leonardo; Manterola Armisén, Javier; López Padilla, Amando (1995). "Puente sobre la Ría de Pontevedra en la autopista del Atlántico". Hormigón y acero (in Spanish). 46 (196): 9–14. ISSN 0439-5689.

=== Related articles ===
- Barca Bridge
- Currents Bridge
- Burgo Bridge
- Santiago Bridge
- Tirantes Bridge

=== External links ===
- Ponte da Ria on the website Structurae
