= Engineer Carlos Fernández Casado Bridge =

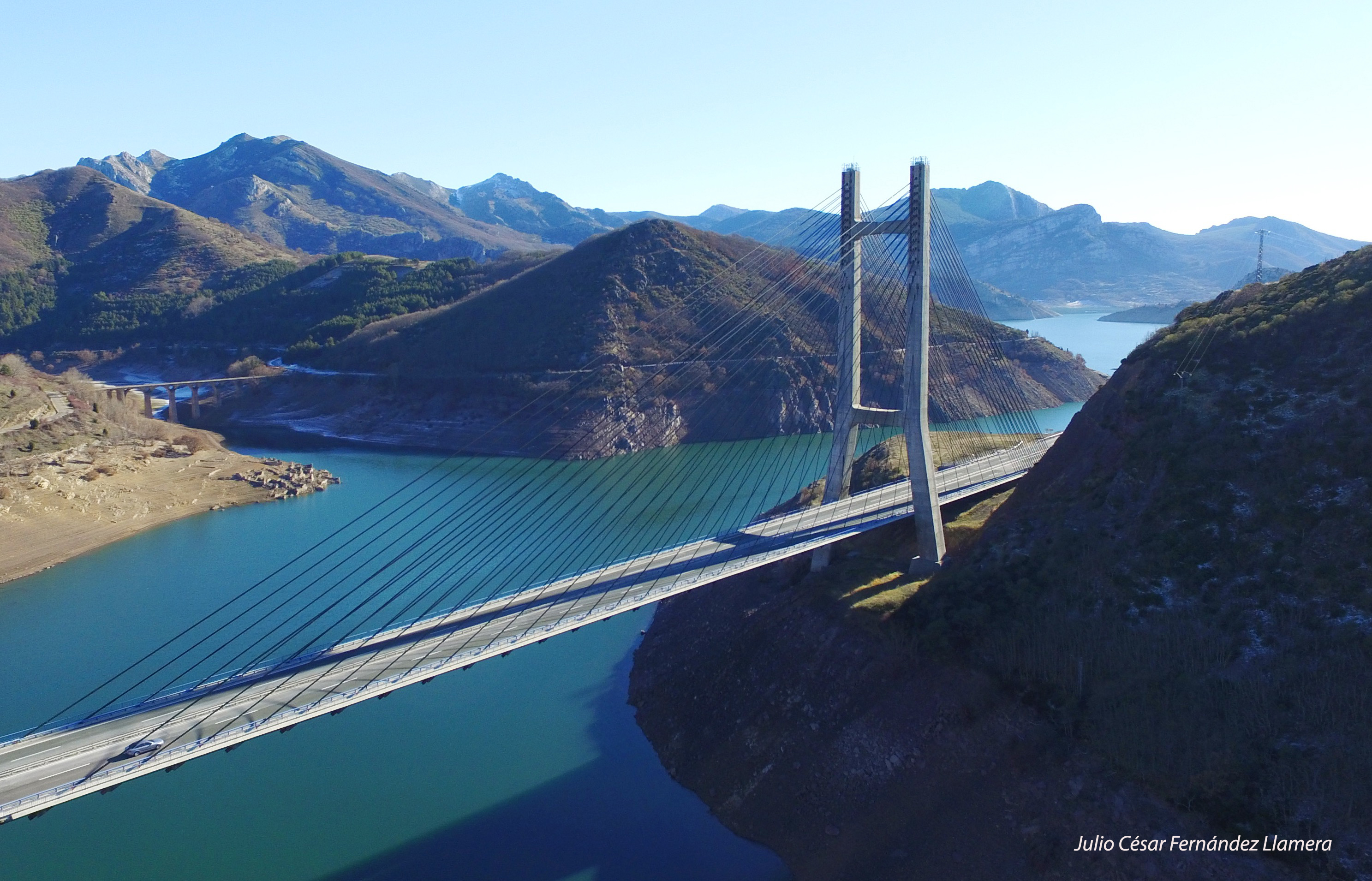
- Coordinates: 42°53′45.9″N 5°53′18″W
- Carries: Motor vehicles
- Crosses: Embalse de Barrios de Luna
- Locale: León, Spain

Characteristics
- Total length: 643 m (2,110 ft)

History
- Construction start: 1981
- Construction end: 1983

The Ingeniero Carlos Fernández Casado Bridge (also called: Engineer Carlos Fernández Casado Bridge) is a cable-stayed bridge that crosses the Barrios de Luna Reservoir in the province of León, Spain. It is part of the Autovia A-66, a major highway. It was inaugurated in 1983 and was the longest cable-stayed bridge by main span from 1983 to 1986.

The bridge was designed by Javier Manterola in honor of the work that the Spanish bridge engineer Carlos Fernández Casado (1905–1988) had contributed to society.

== Design ==
The bridge's two piers are 102 and 117 meters high. The span lengths are 101.7, 440.0 and 101.7 meters, with the deck 22.5 meters wide and 2.3 meters deep.

The bridge had the largest main span of any bridge in Spain until the inauguration of the La Constitución de 1812 Bridge on September 24, 2015, in the Bay of Cádiz.

Comparison between the La Constitución de 1812 Bridge along with the Carlos Fdez. Casado and the Rande Bridge.

== External links / Bibliography ==
- Web of Carlos Fernández Casado, S.L.
- AUCALSA (owner of the A-66 motorway)
- Information from structurae.net, engineering web
