= José León de Carranza Bridge =

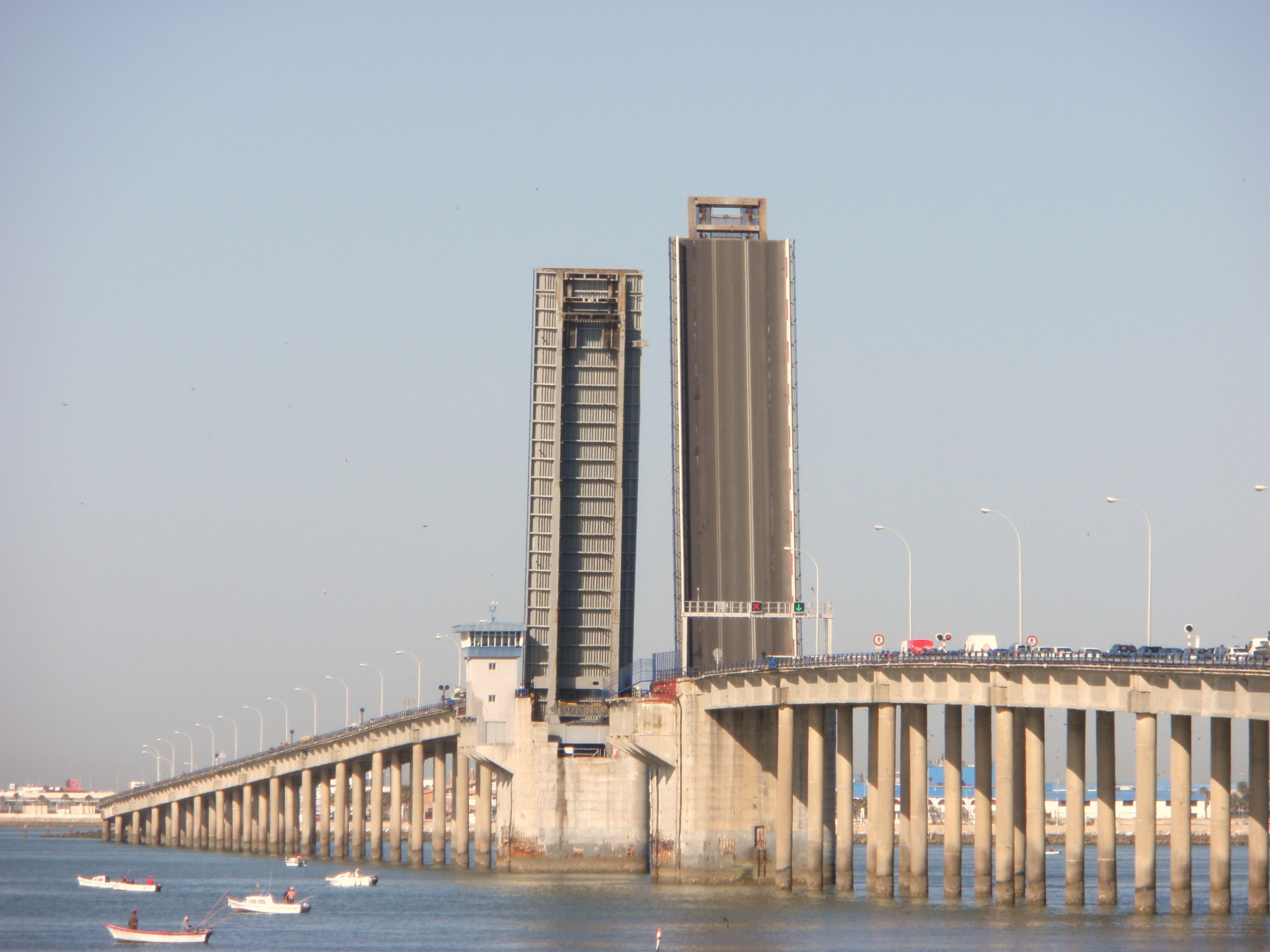
- Coordinates: 36°29′59″N 6°15′17″W
- Carries: N-443
- Crosses: Bay of Cádiz
- Locale: Cádiz; Puerto Real

Characteristics
- Design: Bascule bridge
- Total length: 1,400 m (4,600 ft)
- Width: 13 m (43 ft)
- Height: 18 m (over the sea)
- Longest span: 90 m (300 ft)

History
- Opened: October 28, 1969

Statistics
- Daily traffic: 40,000

José León de Carranza Bridge (also referred to as the Carranza Bridge) is a 1400 m steel bridge that connects the city of Cádiz to the mainland. The bridge goes over the Bay of Cádiz. It forms part of the national network of roads with the number N-443. It is the older of the two bridges crossing to the city of Cádiz, the second being La Pepa Bridge to the north. This bridge is also one of the longest bascule bridges in Europe.
