= La Constitución de 1812 Bridge =

Constitution of 1812 Bridge
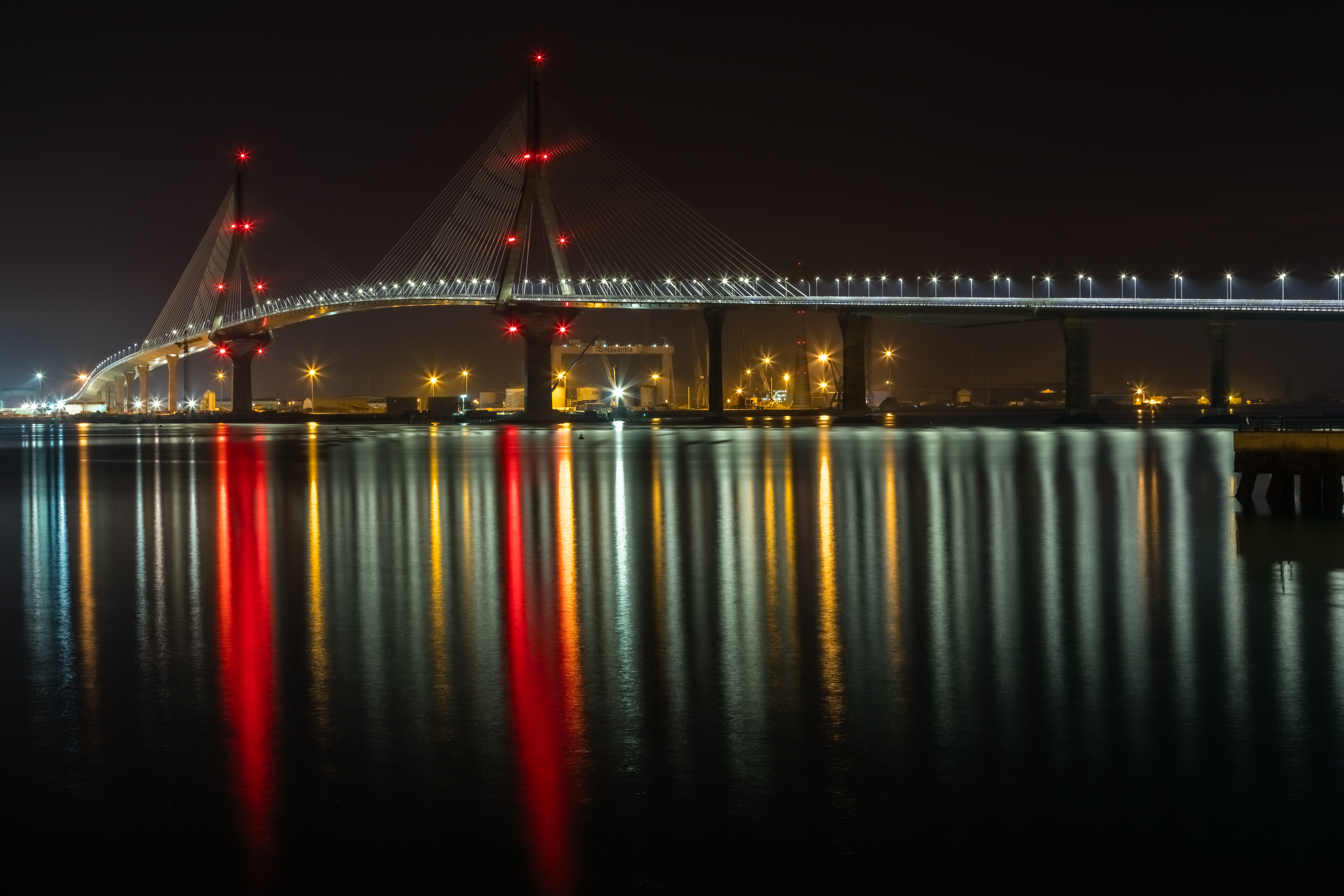
- View of the bridge, in December 2015.
- Coordinates: 36°31′29″N 6°15′25″W
- Carries: 6 lanes (2 lanes each way, and 2 tram ways)
- Crosses: Bay of Cádiz
- Locale: Cádiz and Puerto Real, Spain
- Official name: Constitution of 1812 Bridge

Characteristics
- Design: Cable-stayed bridge by Javier Manterola
- Total length: 3,092 meters (10,144 ft)
- Width: 34.3 meters (113 ft)
- Longest span: 540 meters (1,770 ft)

History
- Opened: 24 September 2015

Statistics
- Daily traffic: expected 20,000 AADT

Location
- Interactive map of Constitution of 1812 Bridge

The Constitution of 1812 Bridge, also known as La Pepa Bridge (Spanish: El puente de la Constitución de 1812 or Puente de La Pepa), is a bridge across the Bay of Cádiz, linking Cádiz with Puerto Real in mainland Spain. It was built in 2015.

Cádiz's first bridge, the Carranza bridge, was inaugurated in 1969, and is now crossed by some 40,000 vehicles per day. In 1982 the Spanish government accepted the need for a second bridge.

It has two 180 m pylons, one in the sea and the other in Cabezuelas Harbour, a 540-meter span and 69 meters of vertical clearance. The bridge also includes a 150-meter removal span.

It is the second bridge that crosses over to Cádiz from the mainland, after Carranza bridge, and one of the highest bridges in Europe, with a gauge of 69 meters and a total length of 5 kilometers. It is the third access to the city, along with the isthmus San Fernando and the Carranza bridge. Given the large width of the deck, it will be a high capacity bridge: a motorway with two lanes in each direction and two lanes reserved for metropolitan public transport such as the Cádiz Bay tram-train.

The bill was drafted by the civil engineer Javier Manterola. The works were scheduled for completion in 2012, coinciding with the bicentenary of the Spanish Constitution of 1812, which was drafted in Cádiz. However, due to cuts in public works resulting from the 2008 financial crisis, the work was more than three years late.

By summer 2013 work had progressed but at a slower pace. As of early 2014 work progressed at a good pace, highlighting the installation of its cable-stayed span and the hiring of more daily staff (including night shifts). As of the first half of 2015, the bridge structure was completed, with full completion in September of the same year.

As data highlights:

- The earlier draft described an arch bridge whose total length was 2.355 km.
- The total length of the current project, viaducts and links is 5 kilometers: 3096 meters on the bridge of which 1655 meters will be over the sea, with a main span of 540 meters record of Spain, with one hundred meters more than the bridge engineer Carlos Fernández Casado, the famous civil engineer, the reservoir Barrios de Luna. Besides the vain is the third largest in Europe suspended class, after Rio-Antirio Bridge and Normandy Bridge.
- The maximum height above the sea level is 69 meters, with two pylons of 187 meters, making it one of the tallest bridges in Europe.
- They are 30 meters higher than the pylons between both sides of the bay.

The bridge connects the San Pedro River (district) in Puerto Real with the neighborhood of La Paz in Cádiz.

== Construction project ==
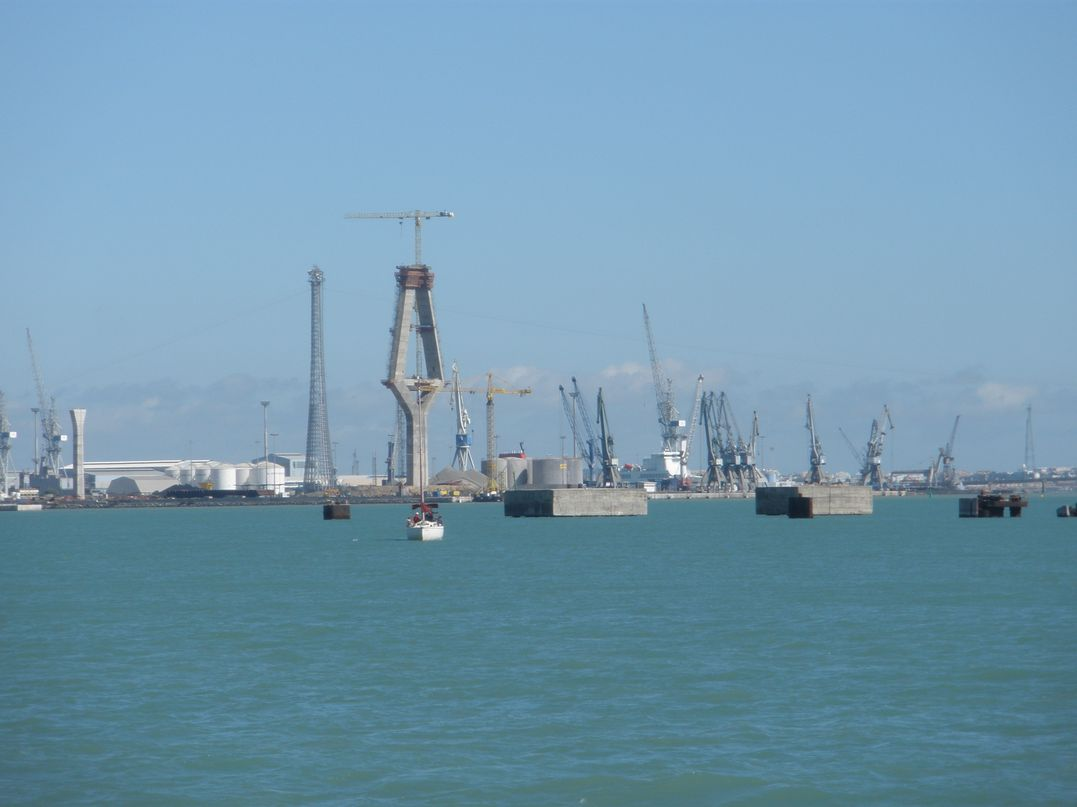
View from the Port of Cádiz

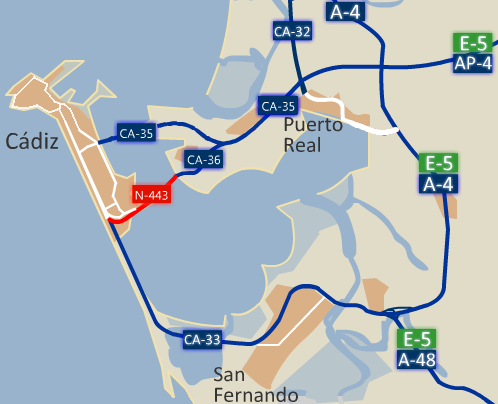
La Pepa Bridge is an extension of CA-35 road to cross the Bay of Cádiz. Carranza Bridge is an extension of CA-36 road. They save 20 km (12 mi).

The proposed construction of a new access to the city of Cádiz by way of a bridge over the Bay has its origins in the Order of Highways Studies in April 2003, which in turn took into account various studies dating back to 1989. The aim of the project was to resolve the traffic congestion problems suffered by the access to Cádiz from Puerto Real (Bridge José León de Carranza and CA-33).

The draft included studies for three riders that link the N-443 in the San Pedro Bay crossing access into Cádiz:

- A. Northern Zone Cabezuela straight through Bay area reaching the shipyard in Cádiz, past the northern edge of spring Cabezuela.
- B. The limit shipyards factory in Matagorda, and after passing through the southern end of spring Cabezuela, describes an arc in the bay to reach the area also shipyards in Cádiz, thus saving the channel navigation, in order to reduce the junction depth.
- C. Continued on the trace of the N-443, and when one reaches the edge of the bay, on the southern edge of Astilleros de Matagorda, crosses S for describing a road connecting with the city in the Props area, connecting with the new diagonal Avenue and Bay.

In all three cases a cross section separated by two lanes, shoulders and median lanes are envisioned.

Regarding the crossing structure bay, the three paths are designed in submerged tunnel. Moreover, in the "A" alternative solution fixed bridge large gauge was studied because it was the only one whose configuration permitted naturally, across a single alignment channel surfing and having a path straight admitting great light openings for the passage of ships. Similarly, three alternatives were studied bridge: archery, cable-stayed and suspension.

The "A" alternative structure bridge for crossing the Bay was selected as the best solution for urban traffic on both banks of the bay, the lowest investment also considered that nicely integrates both urban planning and landscape.

Of the different types of bridge studied, the braced was selected as the lowest cost and the simplest structural concept.

== Execution of the work ==
Its construction has been contracted to the joint venture (UTE) formed by Dragados and DRACE (Special and Dragados Construcciones). The project has a budget of 273 million euros, and their duration is estimated at 42 months.

Workers are 500 direct employment in times of maximum intensity.

== Description ==
Longitudinal view of the bridge

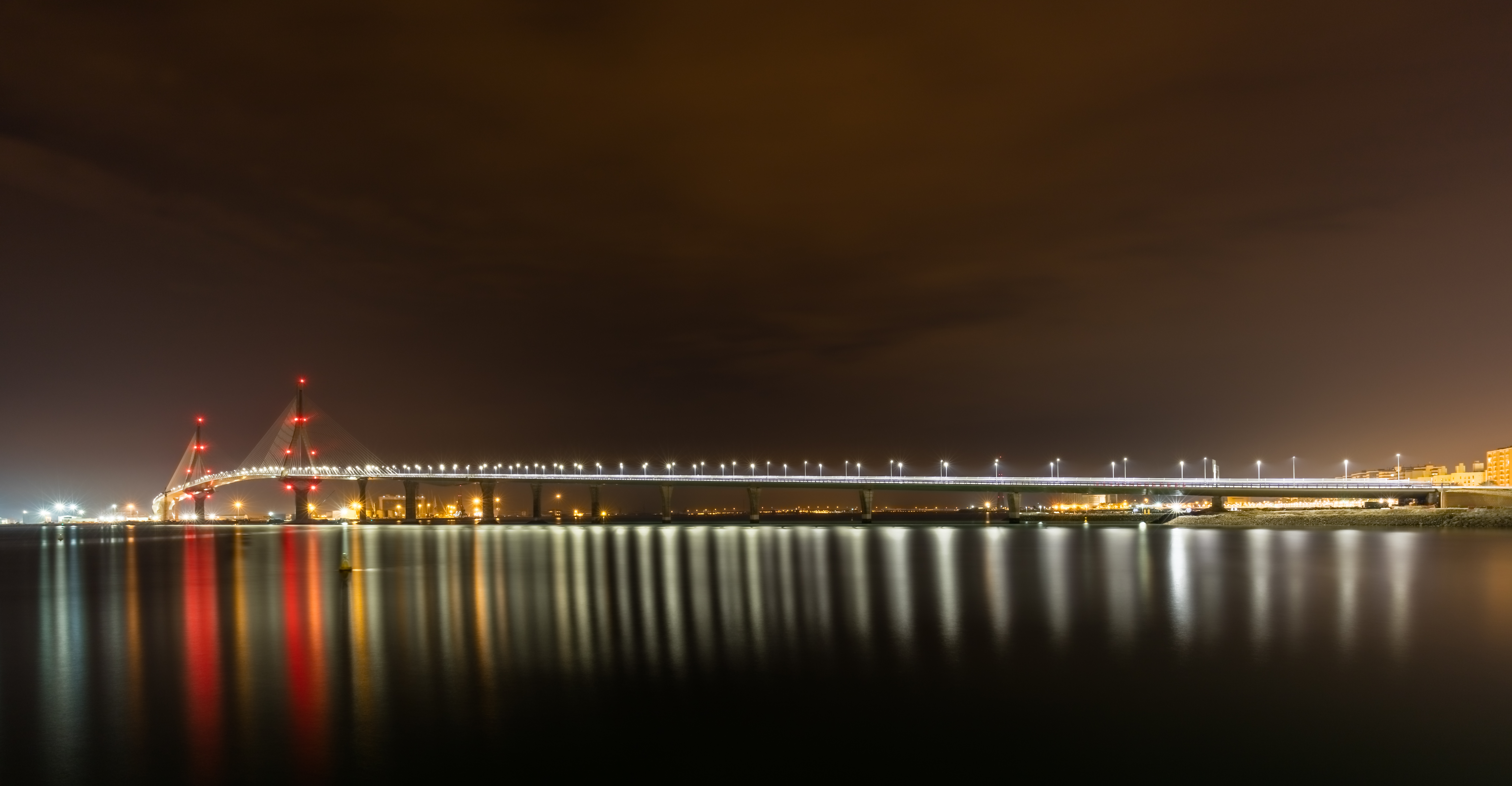
Longitudinal view at night

It is a highway whose speed adopted in the project, as permitted approval of the draft, has been set at 80 km/h, justified based on the urban nature of the performance.

The bridge has a total length of 4580 meters, with the following lights in the sea:

- Access to Cádiz: 25 meters × 7 meters; 75 meters
- Stretch detachable: 150 meters
- Access Puerto Real: 850 meters

The suspension bridge is the highest stretch with maximum longitudinal slope of 5%. On land the bridge is built on the industrial area of La Cabezuela, releasing the existing road condition.

It has three lanes in each direction for vehicular traffic, with central median 0.8 meters with a rigid barrier, and side sidewalks with net width of 1.30 meters. The total width of the bridge is 30.5 meters except where the bracing section expands 32.5 meters to accommodate suspension struts.

=== Dredging ===
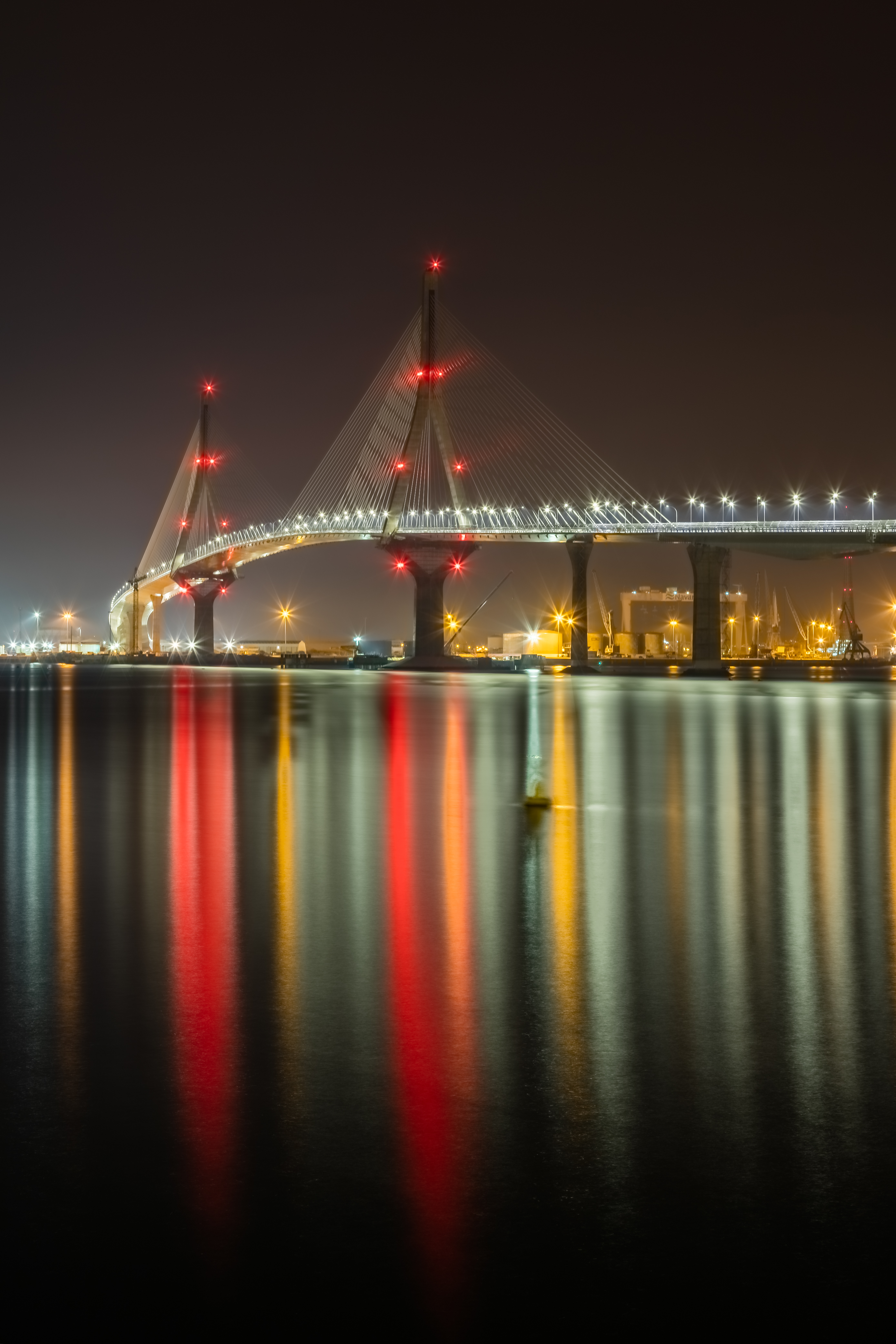
Night view of the center of the bridge (December 2015)

The layer of Quaternary materials is dredged so that sidewalks foundation of pile caps settle to the firm layer of Pliocene, and poured into the high seas.

=== Bridge pylons ===
Of the 39 support, 37 batteries + 2 stirrups, 12 are in the sea, all by in site piles 2 meters in diameter, with embedding in the Pliocene.

==== Stirrup Cádiz ====
The bridge begins in a vial, with the preferred direction to and from the new bridge, a roundabout in the capital, maintaining connections and access to it on the surface.

==== Cádiz access ====
Its length is 581.2 meters with a mixed structure and topped with concrete ribbed floor slabs. The vain guy is 75 meters above the batteries, which are supported by pylons. The pylons are 30 meters deep with 4–6 pylons.

Battery sections are formed by a double gap with widths ranging from 4.00 to 2.9 trapezius meters depending on the height and between 32.079 meters and 7,804 meters. At the top of this stack, it widens a reach of 10.5 meters which is to gather support with neoprene Teflon, 2700 tons payload, except for the battery 1 will be 2500 tons.
