= Pylons of Cádiz =

Coordinates: 36°31′09″N 6°14′55″W

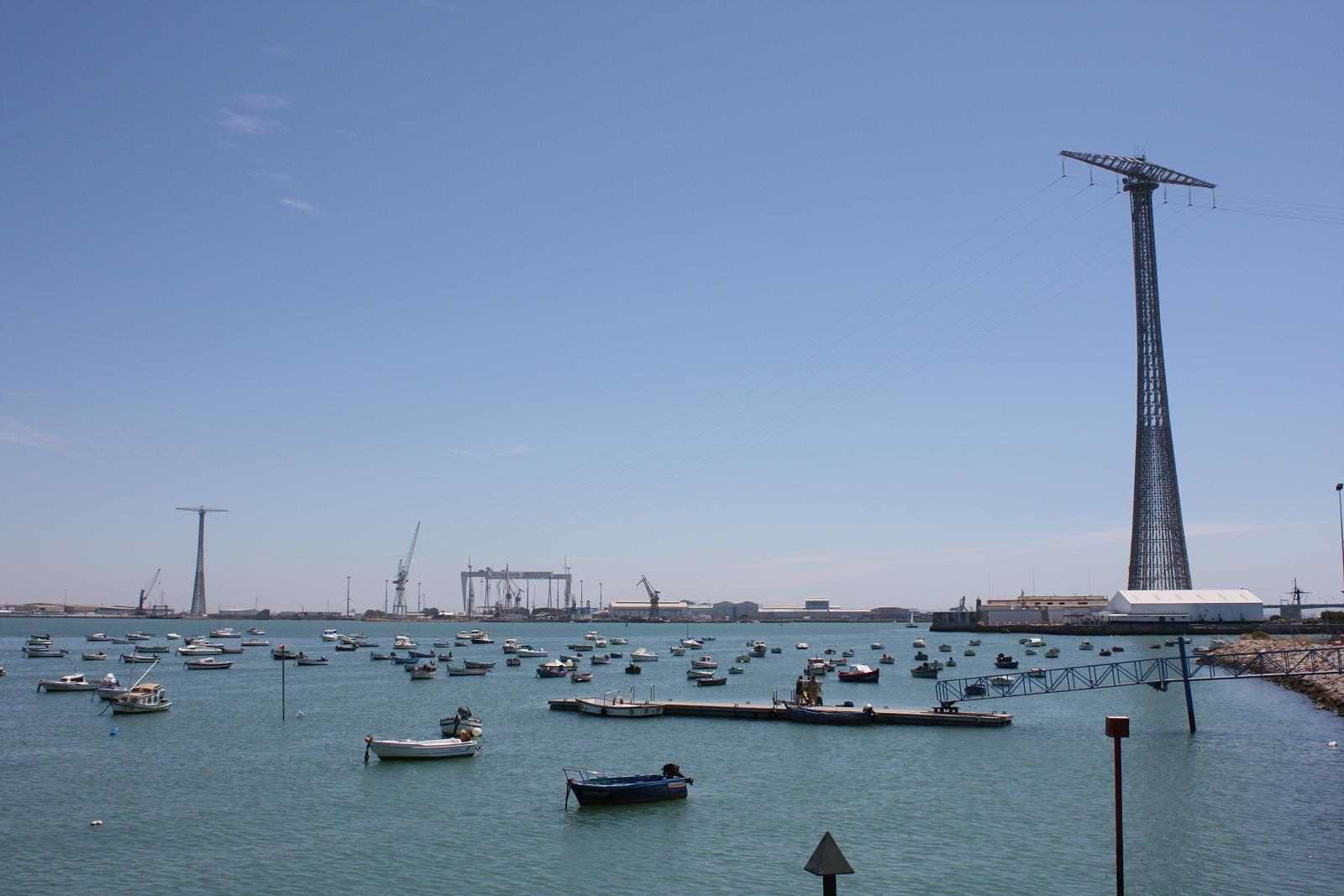
Pylons of Cádiz

The Pylons of Cádiz, also known as the Towers of Cádiz, are two 158 m (518 ft)-tall pylons supporting a double-circuit 132 kV three-phase AC powerline over the bay of Cádiz, Spain, running from Puerto Real Substation to the substation of the former Cádiz Thermal Power Station, situated on the peninsula upon which the city of Cádiz stands.

== Description ==
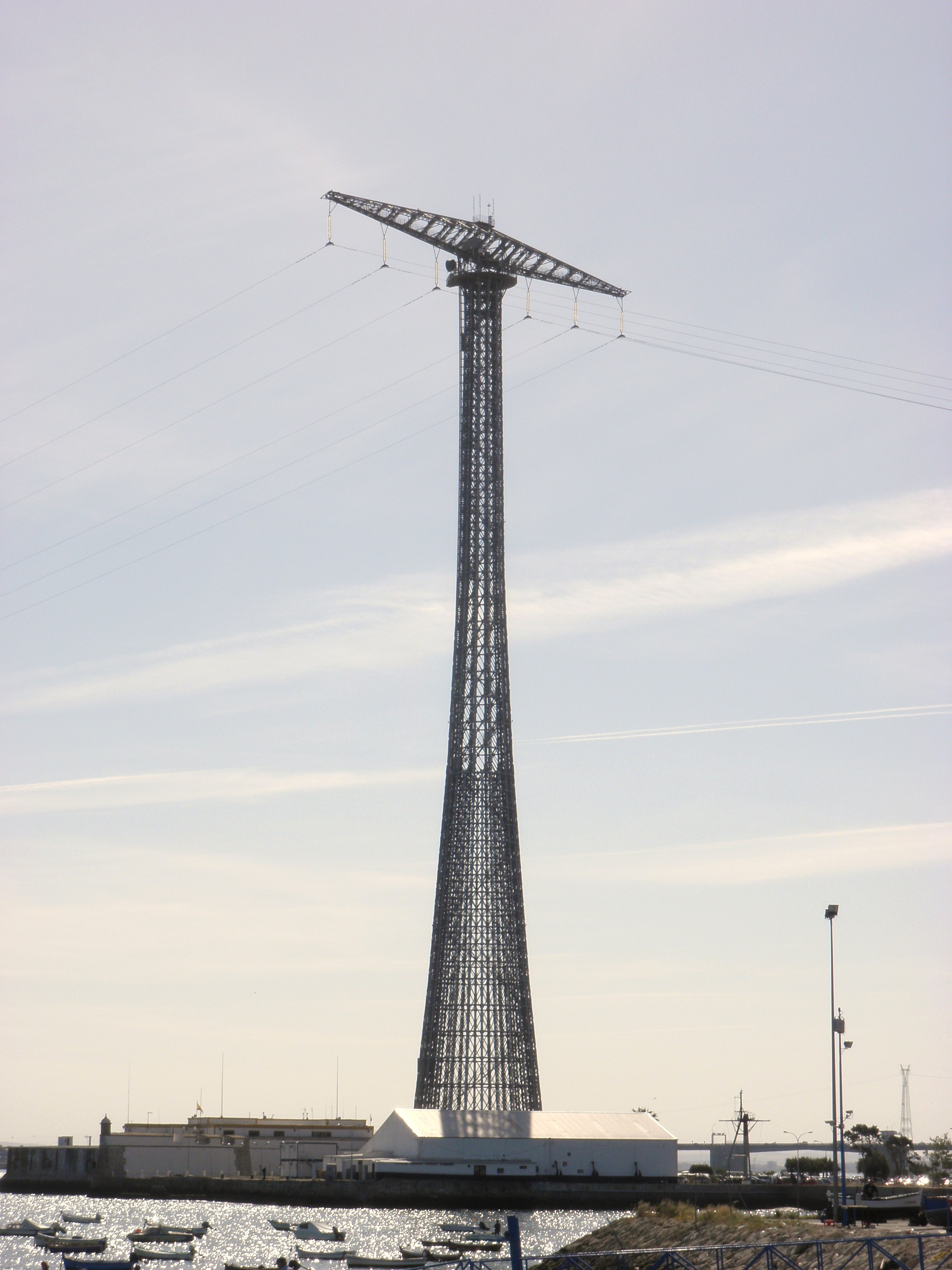
Cádiz pylon

The suspension towers are situated in Cádiz near Fort Puntales and the Puntales Naval Station and at Matagorda quarter near the commercial wharves. The crossing consists of 16 pylons: two suspension pylons, both 158 metres (518 feet) tall, that carry the line over the Bay of Cádiz, two strainer portals built of concrete, and at each strainer portal a group of 6 monopolar strainers, which are used to carry the conductors from the strainer portal to the first standard line tower (at the northern end of the span) respectively to the switchyard of Cádiz Substation (at the southern end of the span). The strainer portal at the southern end is situated close to Cádiz Substation, that of the northern end at Matagorda. The rest of the line consists of pylons with three crossbars carrying six conductors. The powerline crossing does not use a ground conductor in the span section despite its great height.

== Design and construction ==
Each tower is a hollow mast resembling a truncated cone (or frustum). The diameter of the frustum decreases from 20.7 metres at the base to six metres at the top. The towers, which rest on reinforced concrete plinths carry on their pinnacle a single crossbar with rhomboid profile, on which the insulators carrying the conductors are fixed. A helical staircase winds its way up the interior of the structure to the top.

This unconventional design was conceived and designed by Italian engineer Alberto M. Toscano. It was chosen because Spanish steel mills were unable to produce massive steel carriers at the time, and importing such carriers was impossible in Francoist Spain.

The construction was carried out under the supervision and direction of Remo Scalla, a close friend of Toscano. The same team of Toscano, the designer, and Scalla, the builder, also joined forces in building the Pylons of Messina which support the lines that span the Strait of Messina, between Calabria, on the mainland of Italy, and the island of Sicily. The Cádiz project started during the latter part of 1957 and concluded in 1960. Upon completion, the towers were acquired by the Spanish National Institute of Industry.

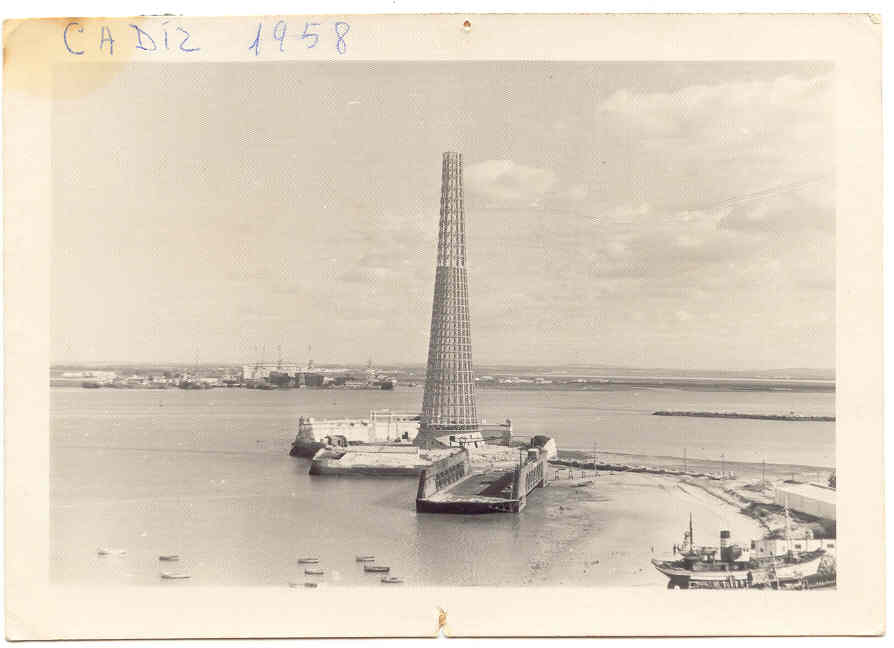
One of the towers under construction in 1958

== See also ==
- Costa de la Luz
- List of tallest towers
- The Shukhov Tower on the Oka River near Nizhniy Novgorod, Russia, has a similar design
