= Javier Manterola =

Spanish civil engineer (1936–2024)

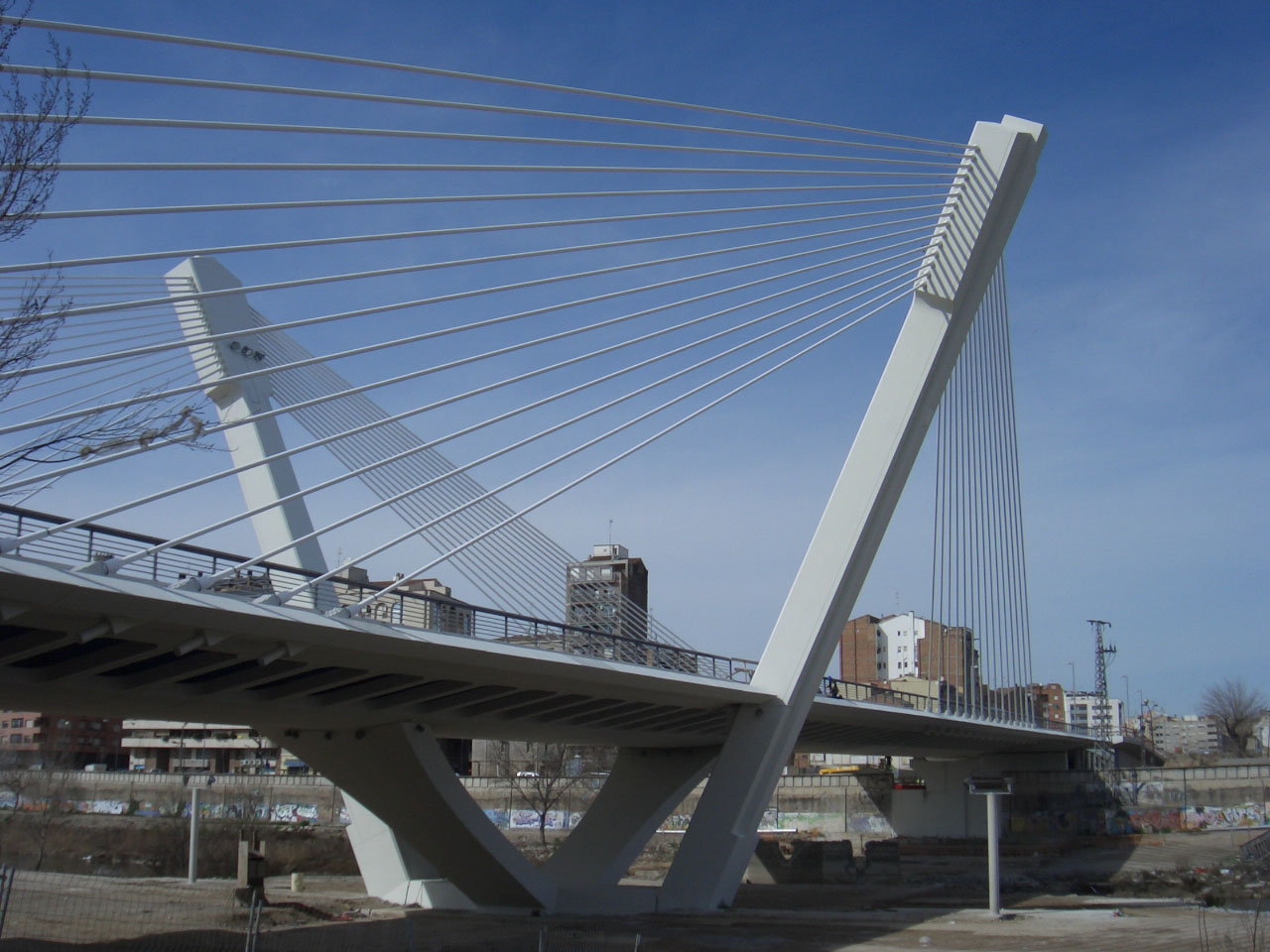
Príncep de Viana bridge in Lleida.

Javier Manterola Armisén (17 June 1936 – 12 May 2024) was a Spanish civil engineer and professor at the Escuela Superior de Ingenieros de Madrid. Manterola was particularly known for his work as a bridge designer of the engineering firm Carlos Fernández Casado. Author of numerous and varied projects, in collaboration with different Spanish architects such as Rafael Moneo and others, he won, over his professional career, several awards such as the Premio Príncipe de Viana de la Cultura. He was a member of the Real Academia de Bellas Artes de San Fernando.

== Life and career ==
Probably, his best known work is the Puente de La Pepa, opened in 2015. This bridge has become the main access to the city of Cádiz. Another of his most important designs is the Engineer Carlos Fernández Casado bridge on the AP-66 which spans a part of the Barrios de Luna reservoir in León, which was a world record for a decade in several categories and is still the second longest span in Spain, after the above-mentioned La Pepa Bridge. Designer of many bridges in Zaragoza, Manterola designed the Manuel Giménez Abad Bridge for Zaragoza's third ring road (Z-30) and the Barranco de la Muerte aqueduct, structure for the Canal Imperial de Aragón to span the previously mentioned Z-30. For the Expo 2008, Manterola designed a pedestrian bridge called Pasarela del Voluntariado. Another of his designs is the bridge on the Ebro for the Spanish Madrid-Barcelona high-speed railway line. He was also the designer of the Puente de Andalucía on the Guadalquivir in Córdoba and the Puente de las Delicias in Seville. In Vizcaya, Manterola was the designer of the Euskalduna Bridge on the Estuary of Bilbao and several bridges for the Supersur motorway.

Manterola also participated in numerous restoration projects of historic bridges, like the Puente Nuevo in Murcia (2001–2003) in which a city bridge closed to traffic due to structural reasons was transformed into a pedestrian bridge retaining the original structure during the restoration.

Manterola died on 12 May 2024, the name day of the saint patron of civil engineers, Dominic de la Calzada, aged 87.

== Honours and awards ==
- 2006: International Award of Merit in Structural Engineering from the International Association for Bridge and Structural Engineering

== Bibliography ==
- Manterola Armisén, Javier; Fernández Revenga, Javier; Muñoz-Rojas Fernández, Javier (2004), Memorias de patrimonio 1998-2002. Intervenciones en el patrimonio histórico de la Región De Murcia. Inmuebles. Nº 6 (PDF), Murcia, Spain: Consejería de Educación y Cultura. Dirección General de Cultura. Servicio de Patrimonio Histórico, pp. 253–266, D.L.: MU-1.732-2004, archived from the original (PDF) on 15 July 2011
