= Walls of Madrid =

Series of walls built around the city of Madrid, Spain

Coordinates: 40°24′54″N 03°42′53″W

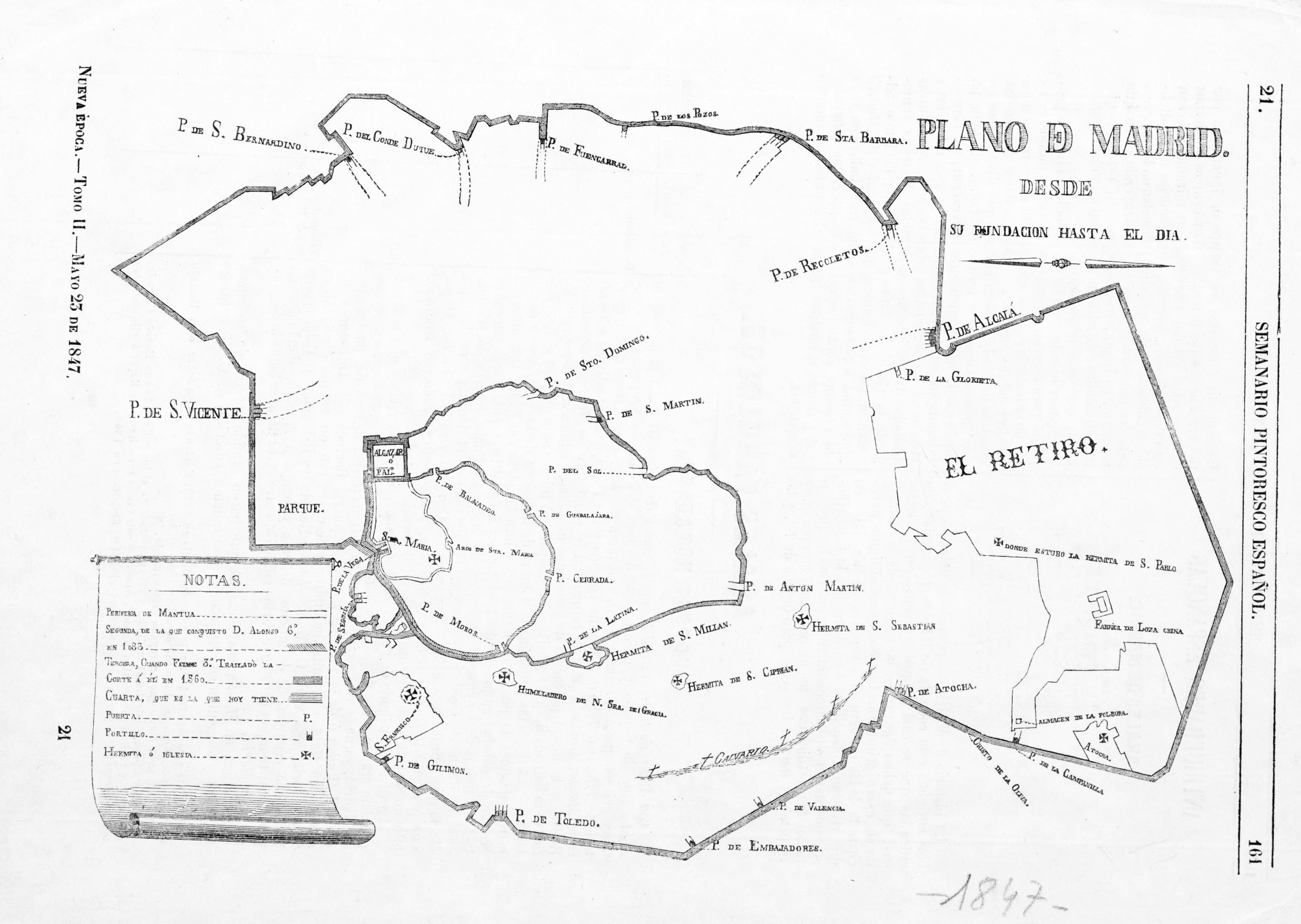
Plan of the different Walls of Madrid, published in 1847 in the Semanario Pintoresco Español.

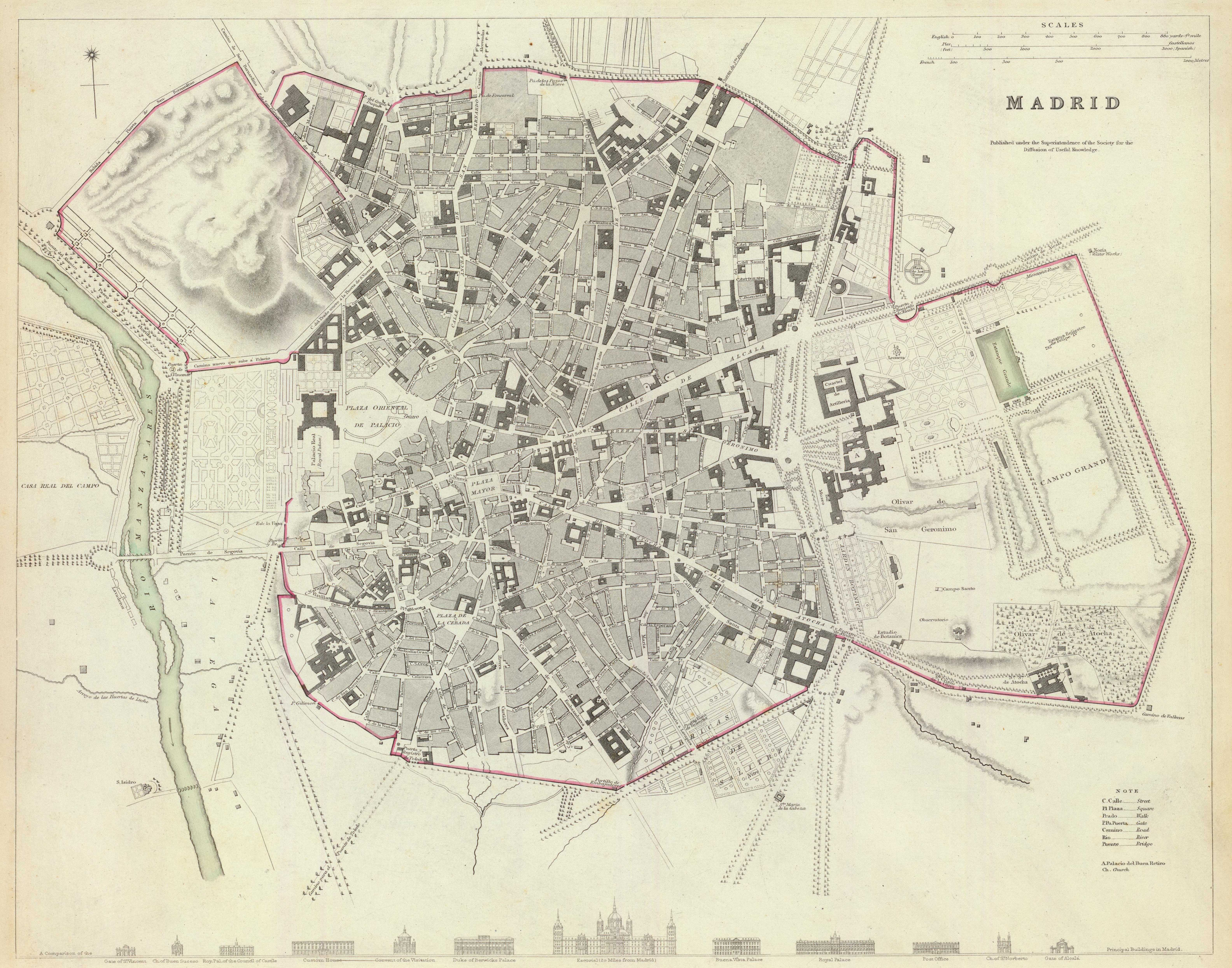
Madrid with its walls (red line) in 1831.

The Walls of Madrid (Spanish: cerca de Madrid, tapia de Madrid) are the five successive sets of walls that surrounded the city of Madrid from the Middle Ages until the end of the 19th century. Some of the walls had a defensive or military function, while others made it easy to tax goods entering the city. Towards the end of the 19th century the demographic explosion that came with the Industrial Revolution prompted urban expansion throughout Spain. Older walls were torn down to enable the expansion of the city under the grid plan of Carlos María de Castro.

== Muslim Walls of Madrid ==
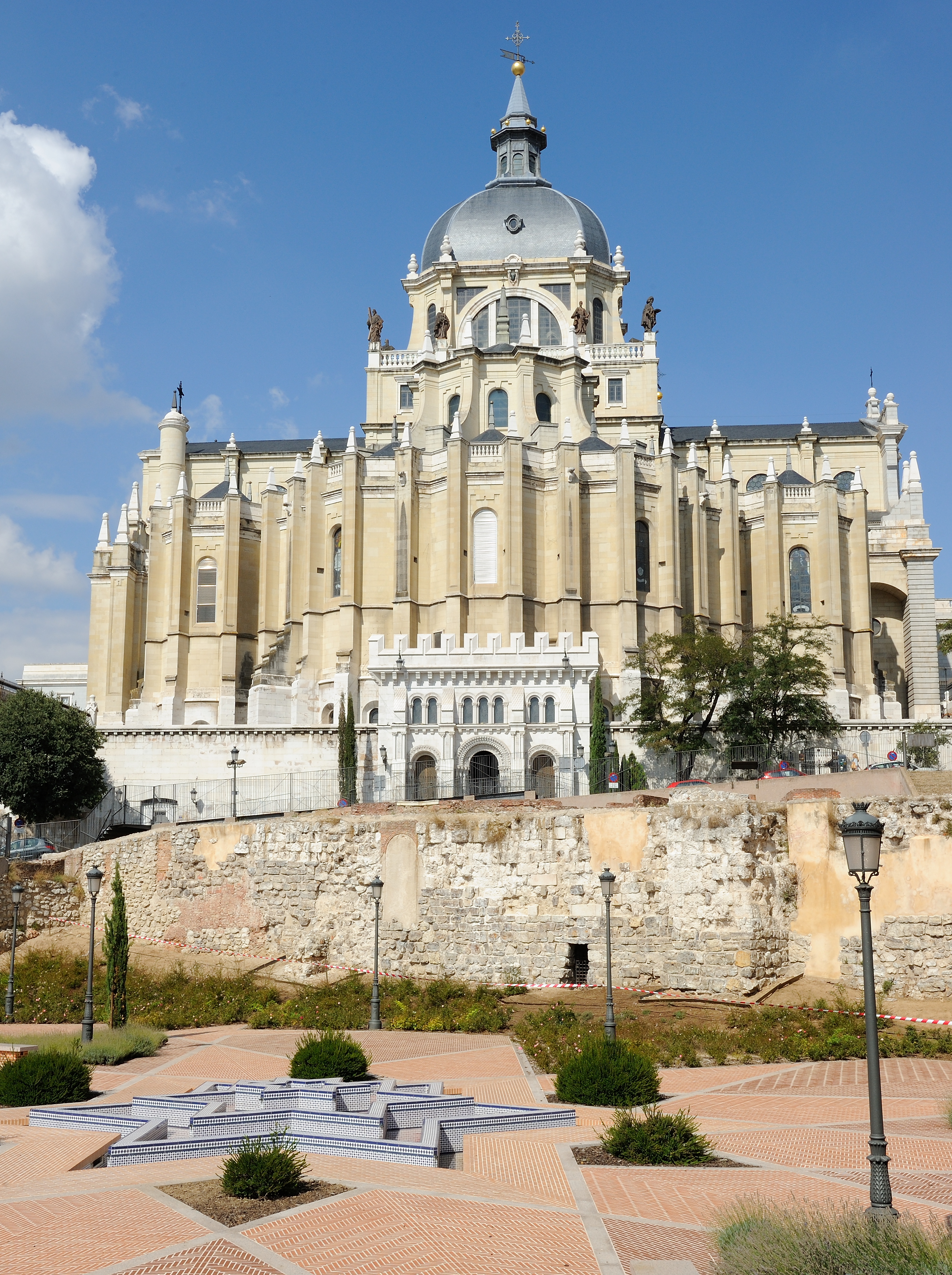
Muslim wall of Madrid and rear façade of the Cathedral of Our Lady of La Almudena

The Muslim Walls of Madrid, of which some vestiges remain, are probably the oldest construction in the city. The walls were built in the 9th century, during the period of Muslim rule in the Iberian Peninsula. They were part of a fortress around which developed the urban nucleus of Madrid and started on a promontory next to the Manzanares river. To defend the almudaina or Muslim citadel of Mayrit, Umayyad Emir of Cordoba Muhammad I ordered the walls to be built between the years 860 and 880 near the site currently occupied by the Royal Palace. According to historian Jerónimo de Quintana, the walls were "very strong of masonry and mortar, raised and thick, twelve feet [almost three and half meters] in width, with large cubes, towers gatehouses and moats."

Ruins of the walls still stand along the Calle Mayor street, at number 83, next to the viaduct that serves the Calle de Segovia, along with the ruins of the Tower of Narigües, which probably would have been an albarrana tower. A 70 m (230 ft) long section exists under the Plaza de la Armería, formed by the main façades of the Royal Palace and Almudena Cathedral.

The Muslim walls were declared an Artistic-Historic Monument in 1954.

== Christian Walls of Madrid ==
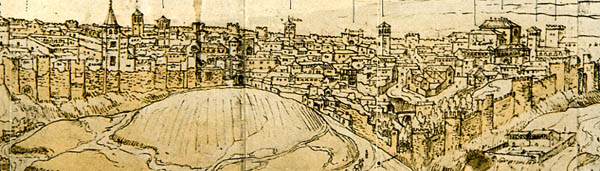
Detail drawing by Anton van den Wyngaerde in 1562, where the Christian Walls of Madrid, near the gate Puerta de la Vega (left) to the gate Puerta de Moros, in the current Plaza del Humilladero is at the right.

The Christian Walls of Madrid, also known as the Medieval Walls, were built between the 11th and 12th centuries, after the Reconquista. They were built as an extension of the original Muslim Walls to accommodate the new districts that emerged after the city passed to the Crown of Castile. Tradition attributes construction to King Alfonso VII of León and Castile (1126–1157) although it is assumed that work began before his reign, during the reign of Alfonso VI of León and Castile (1040–1109).

When Philip II moved his court to Madrid from Valladolid in 1561, the walls fell into disuse and were almost entirely demolished. Some of the walls are integrated into the structure of various buildings of El Madrid de los Austrias, the Habsburgs's historic center of the city.

The remains that are still standing were declared a Historical and Artistic Monument in 1954.

== Walls del Arrabal ==
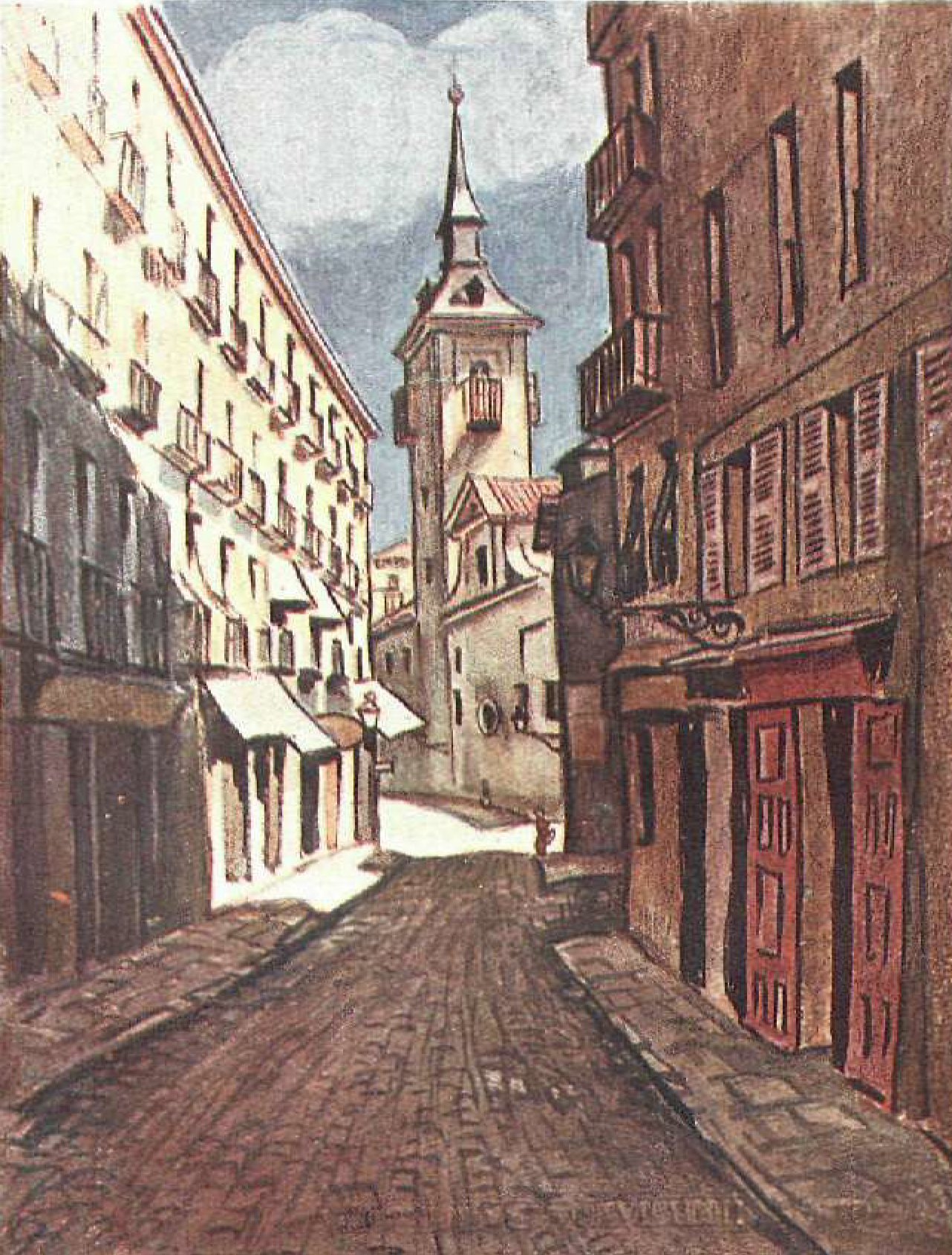
Church of San Gines de Arles

The Walls del Arrabal (walls of the suburb) were the third set of walls, an expansion of the Christian Walls, built around Madrid, by now the capital of Spain. There are no remaining traces of the walls, leaving some question as to their extent and the period of their construction. It is possible that the walls were built as early as the 12th century, however they were most likely constructed around 1438. The walls may have been intended to protect the population against the plagues that ravaged Spain at the time. The walls integrated the suburbs with the city and prevented entry of the infected.

After the construction of the Medieval Walls, the city continued to grow eastward, with the population increasing from 5,000 to 12,000 inhabitants from the mid-15th to early 16th century. The suburbs, or arrabales, took their names from convents, hermitages and churches constructed outside the Muslim Walls in the 12th century. The first of these, known from 1126, was the Arrabal of Saint Martin corresponding to the Convent of San Martín, followed by that of San Ginés by the Church of San Ginés de Arlés.

The walls started from the gate Puerta Cerrada. They surrounded Calle Concepción Jerónima, Conde de Romanones, Plaza de Jacinto Benavente, Calle Carretas, Plaza de la Puerta del Sol, Calle Preciados or Carmen, Plaza de Santo Domingo, Cuesta de Santo Domingo and Plaza de Isabel II. Later, around 1520, the southern part of the wall was extended to enclose more of the city, starting from the Puerta de Moros, following the present streets San Millán, Duque de Alba, Plaza de Tirso de Molina, and Calle Conde Romanones, and continuing with the original course of the mid-15th century.

== Walls of Philip II ==
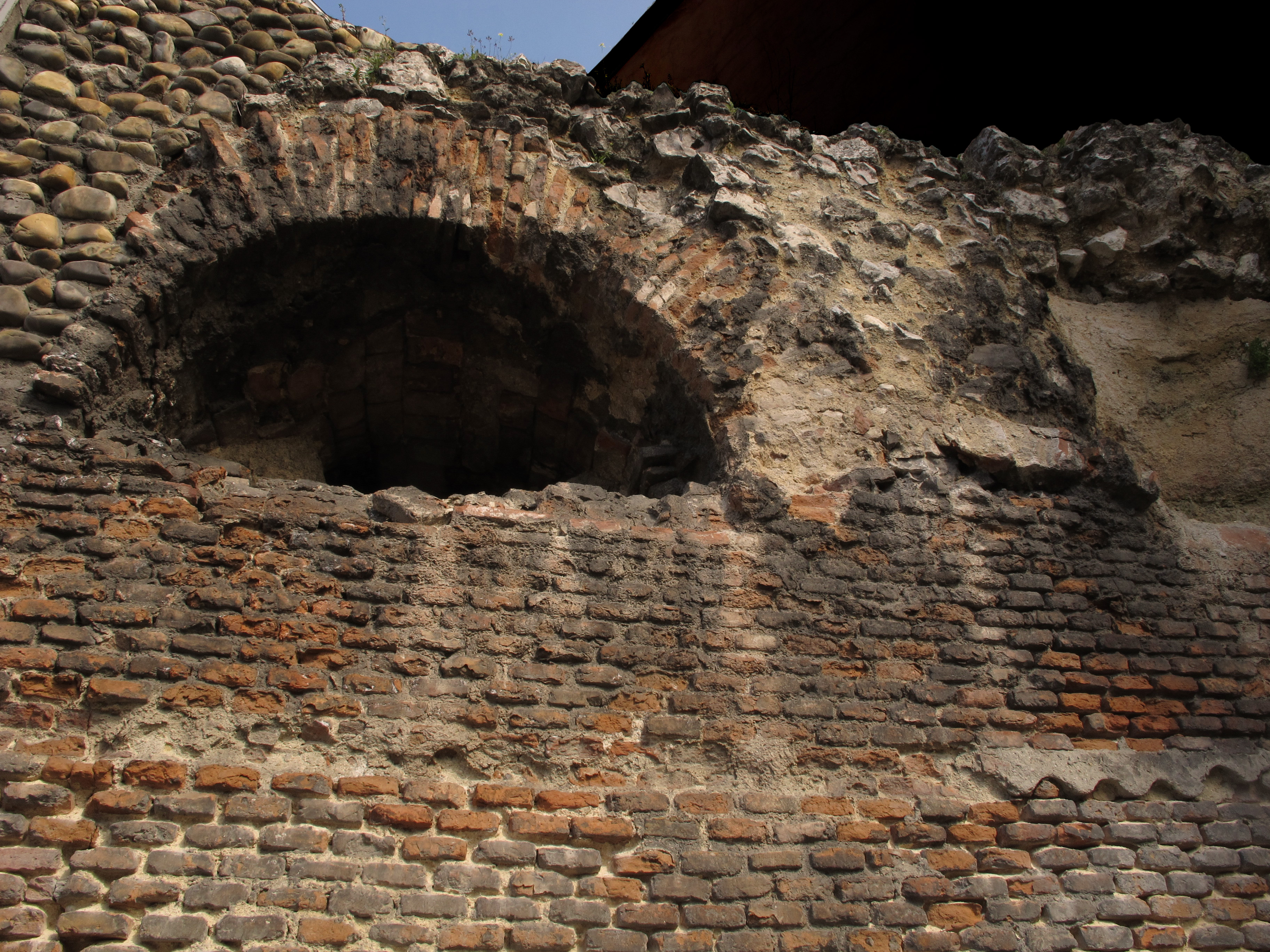
Walls of Philip II

The Walls of Philip II were constructed by Philip II, in 1566, for fiscal and sanitary control. The walls enclosed an area approximately 125 hectares (310 acres) in area.

The walls started from the end of the Christian Walls to the current Calle Segovia, and continued through the streets of las Aguas, Águila, Calatrava, Santa Ana, Juanelo, Cabeza, Magdalena, between the Plaza de Matute y the Calle León, by the streets Echegaray, Cedaceros, Arlabán, Virgen de los Peligros, Aduana, Montera, Gran Vía, joining to the Walls del Arrabal in the Plaza del Callao.

Remains of these walls are found in Calle de Bailén next to the extension of the Palacio del Senado.

== Walls of Philip IV ==
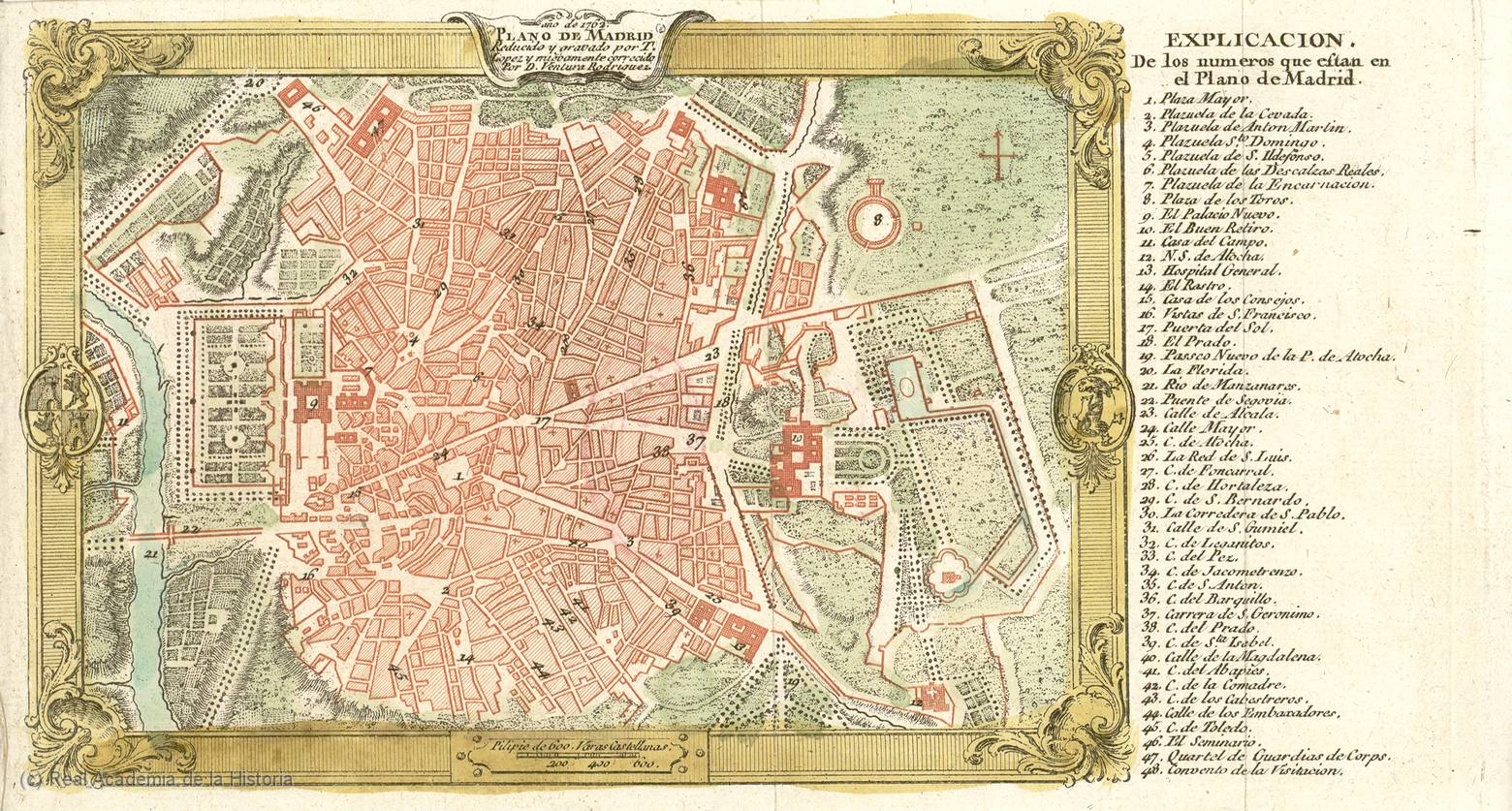
Plan of 1762. The Walls of the time of Philip IV remained intact until mid-19th century.

The Walls of Felipe IV were built around the city of Madrid between 1625 and 1868. Philip IV ordered their construction to replace the earlier Walls of Philip II and the Walls del Arrabal, which had already been surpassed by the growth of population of Madrid. These were not defensive walls, but essentially served fiscal and surveillance purposes: to control the access of goods to the city, ensure the collection of taxes, and to monitor who went in and out of Madrid. The materials used for construction were brick, mortar and compacted earth.

The walls began from the current Cuesta de la Vega, continuing via the Rondas of Segovia, Toledo, Valencia and Atocha, plaza del Emperador Carlos V, the avenues of Ciudad de Barcelona and Menéndez Pelayo, Calle de Alcalá, plaza de la Independencia, the streets of Serrano, Jorge Juan, plaza de Colón, Génova, Sagasta, Carranza, and then turning left in San Bernardo going by Santa Cruz de Marcenado, Serrano Jover, la Princesa, Ventura Rodríguez, Ferraz, Cuesta de San Vicente, Paseo de la Virgen del Puerto and running alongside the Campo del Moro, until finally linking again with Cuesta de la Vega.

The route of the wall was adapted to the configuration of the terrain, which made it very irregular. By 1650 it covered the Mountain del Príncipe Pío, the Buen Retiro and the Hermitage of Atocha. It prevented the city's growth, thereby keeping its population in overcrowded conditions for over two hundred years.

== See also ==
- Defensive wall

== Bibliography ==
- del Amo Horga, Luz María (2002). Cercas, puertas y portillos de Madrid, (S.XVI-XIX) (PDF). Universidad Complutense.
- Fernández Ugalde, A.; Marín Perellón, F. J.; Mena Muñoz, P.; Serrano Herrero, E (1998). Las murallas de Madrid. Arqueología medieval urbana (in Spanish) (1st ed.). Madrid: Comunidad de Madrid, Dirección General de Patrimonio Cultural.
- Fraguas, Rafael (21 September 1999). "Descubiertos los Supuestos Restos del Acceso a la Ciudadela" [The Likely Remains of the Access to the Citadel are discovered]. El País newspaper (in Spanish). nova.es. Archived from the original on 20 June 2000.
- Montero Vallejo, M. (2007). Fernández García, A. (ed.). Madrid musulmán (in Spanish) (3ª ed.). Madrid: Instituto de Estudios Madrileños. pp. 88–92.
