= Walls of Philip II =

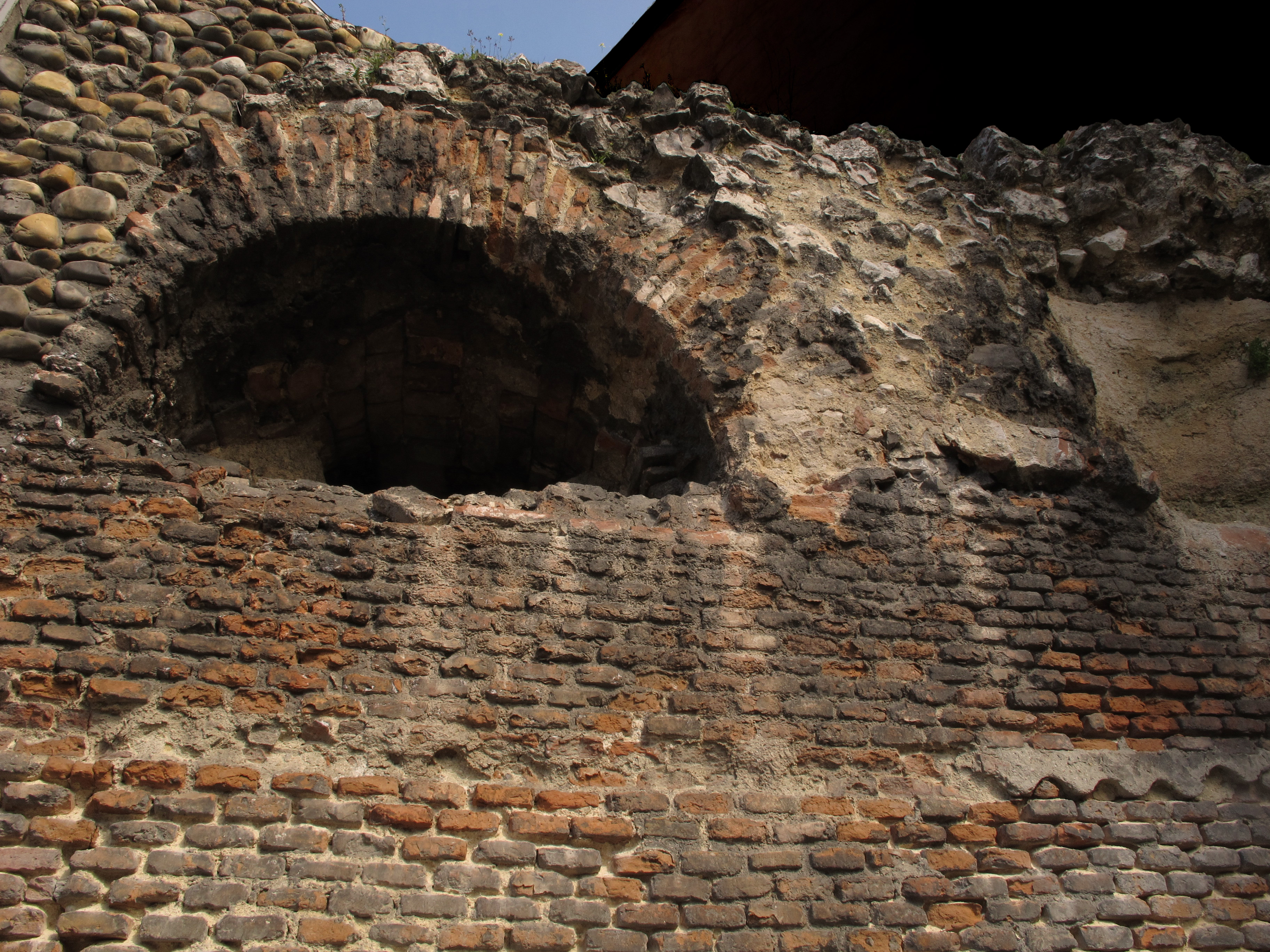
Walls of Philip II

The Walls of Philip II (Spanish: cerca de Felipe II) were walls in the city of Madrid that Philip II, in 1566, constructed for fiscal and sanitary control. The walls enclosed an area of about 125 ha (310 acres).

== Background ==
The walls started from the Christian Walls at its height to the current Calle Segovia, and continued through the streets of las Aguas, Águila, Calatrava, Santa Ana, Juanelo, Cabeza, Magdalena, between the Plaza de Matute y the Calle León, by the streets Echegaray, Cedaceros, Arlabán, Virgen de los Peligros, Aduana, Montera, Gran Vía, joining to the Walls del Arrabal in the Plaza del Callao.

This Walls had 8 main gates and access postigos:

- Puerta de la Vega, a survivor of the Arab wall. It was replaced in 1708 and finally demolished in 1814.
- Puerta de Segovia, Segovia near the Puente de Segovia. It was where roads connected to Castile and Extremadura.
- Puerta de Toledo, located on the Calle Toledo around its junction with the Calle Calatrava.
- Puerta de Antón Martín, located in the present Plaza de Antón Martín. It took its name from the Hospital de San Juan de Dios, better known by the name of its founder Antón Martín.
- Puerta del Sol, a new gate replaced one of the same name, which stood more forward than the new walls. Located in Calle Alcalá at its intersection with calles Cedaceros and Virgen de los Peligros.
- Puerta de la Red de San Luis, at the Calle Montera which was the exit to Hortaleza and Fuencarral. It took its name from the Iglesia de San Luis Obispo.
- Postigo de San Martín, who was of the walls del Arrabal.
- Puerta de Santo Domingo, which was of the walls del Arrabal.

Remains of these walls are found in Calle de Bailén next to the extension of the Palacio del Senado.

== See also ==
- Walls of Madrid
