= Walls del Arrabal =

Walls around Madrid, likely constructed in 1438

The Walls del Arrabal (walls of the suburb) were the third in a set of five walls built around Madrid, now the capital of Spain. There are no remaining ruins of the Walls del Arrabal, leaving some debate as to their extent and the period of their construction. It is possible that the walls were built as early as the 12th century, however they were most likely constructed in 1438. The walls may have been intended to protect people against the plagues that ravaged the city at the time. The walls united the urbanized suburbs of the city and prevented entry of the infected.

The Walls del Arrabal were an expansion of the Christian Walls of Madrid built between the 11th and 12th centuries. They were followed by the Walls of Philip II, c. 1566.

== Historical context ==
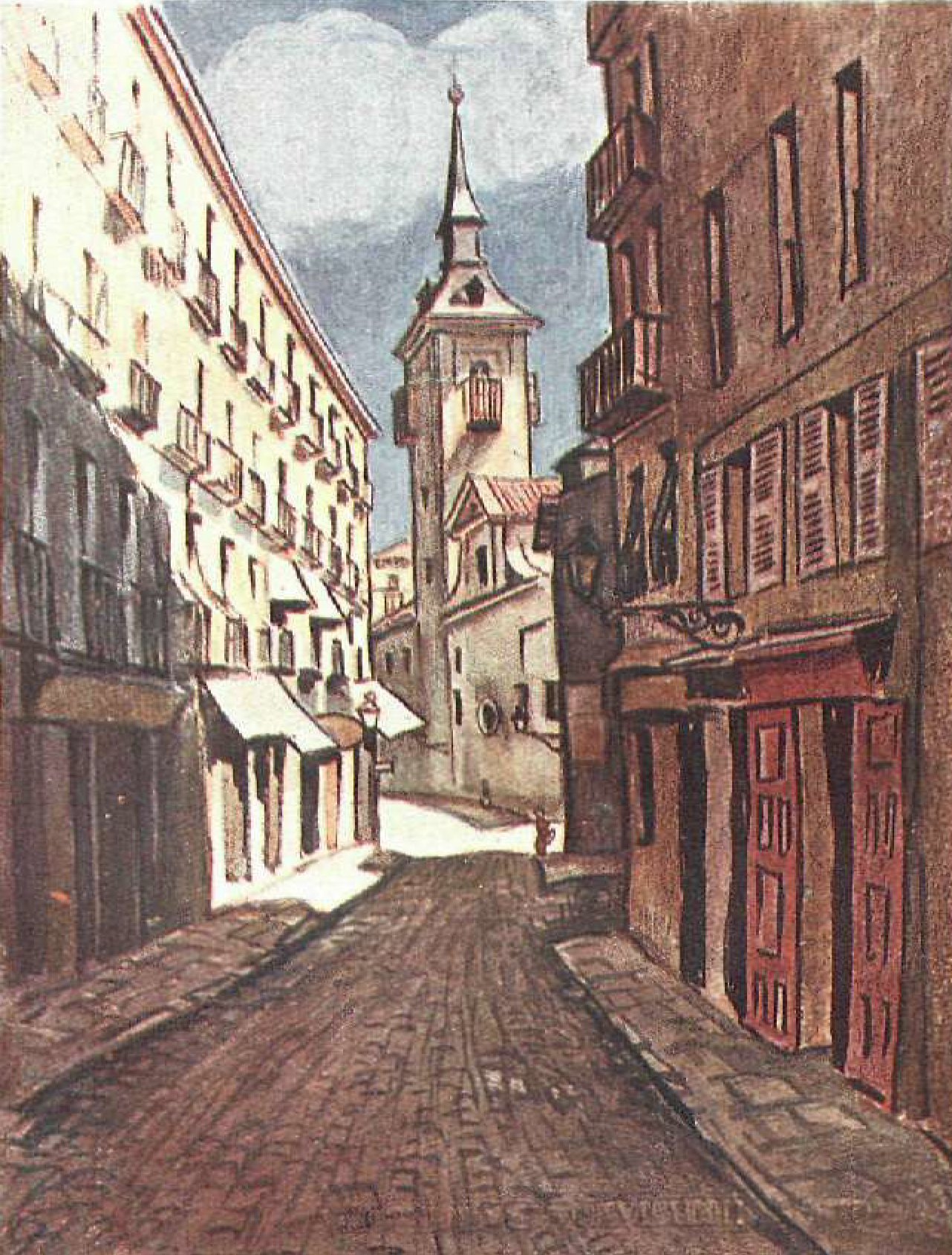
Church of San Gines de Arles

The urban nucleus of Madrid formed around a Muslim fort, and was protected by the Muslim Walls of Madrid (a.k.a. Arab Walls) built in the 9th century. Following the Reconquista, the fortifications were extended with the Christian Walls of Madrid (a.k.a. Medieval Walls) built between the 11th and 12th centuries to enclose new districts. The city continued to grow eastward, with the population increasing from 5,000 to 12,000 inhabitants from the mid-15th to early 16th century. Although Madrid was small, it was considered important among the Medieval Castilian cities, as it was one of seventeen voting places for courts, held there on occasion.

The suburbs, or arrabales, took their names from convents, hermitages and churches constructed outside the Muslim Walls in the 12th century. The first of these, known from 1126, was the Arrabal de San Martín corresponding to the Convent of San Martín, followed by that of San Ginés by the Church of San Ginés de Arlés.

Some writers place the Walls del Arrabal's construction in the mid-12th century, under Henry IV of Castile. Fernando Urgorri dated it to the mid-12th century in Ensanche de Madrid en Tiempos de Juan II y Enrique IV. However, he left out the suburb of Santo Domingo and drew the walls as they existed in 1440, in times of John II of Castile. It may be that these constructions refer to some of the suburbs being fortified individually, as San Martín and Santo Domingo each had their own walls at some point. According to León Pinelo, a new wall was built to accommodate the Castilian and Leon knights who came with Alfonso VIII (r.1158–1214), the only suburb at that time being San Martín.

Others place the construction between the fifteenth and eighteenth centuries, starting around the space known as the "Caños del Peral", now the Plaza de Isabel II. Professor Montero Vallejo said that the Walls del Arrabal were built in 1438, under John II. According to Vallejo, it was built mainly for administrative and sanitary purposes, due to a great plague, one of the many misfortunes that struck Madrid during the 15th century. This wall enclosed all the suburbs, including Santa Cruz and San Millan. A hospital, named Del Buen Suceso, was built for plague victims and stood outside the walls, facing the Puerta del Sol; the hospital was closed in 1854.

The Walls started from the gate Puerta Cerrada. They surrounded Calle Concepción Jerónima, Conde de Romanones, Plaza de Jacinto Benavente, Calle Carretas, Plaza de la Puerta del Sol, Calle Preciados or Carmen, Plaza de Santo Domingo, Cuesta de Santo Domingo and Plaza de Isabel II.

Later, around 1520, the southern part of the wall was extended to enclose more of the city, starting from the Puerta de Moros, following the present streets San Millán, Duque de Alba, Plaza de Tirso de Molina, and Calle Conde Romanones, and continuing with the original course of the mid-15th century.

== Gates and postigos ==
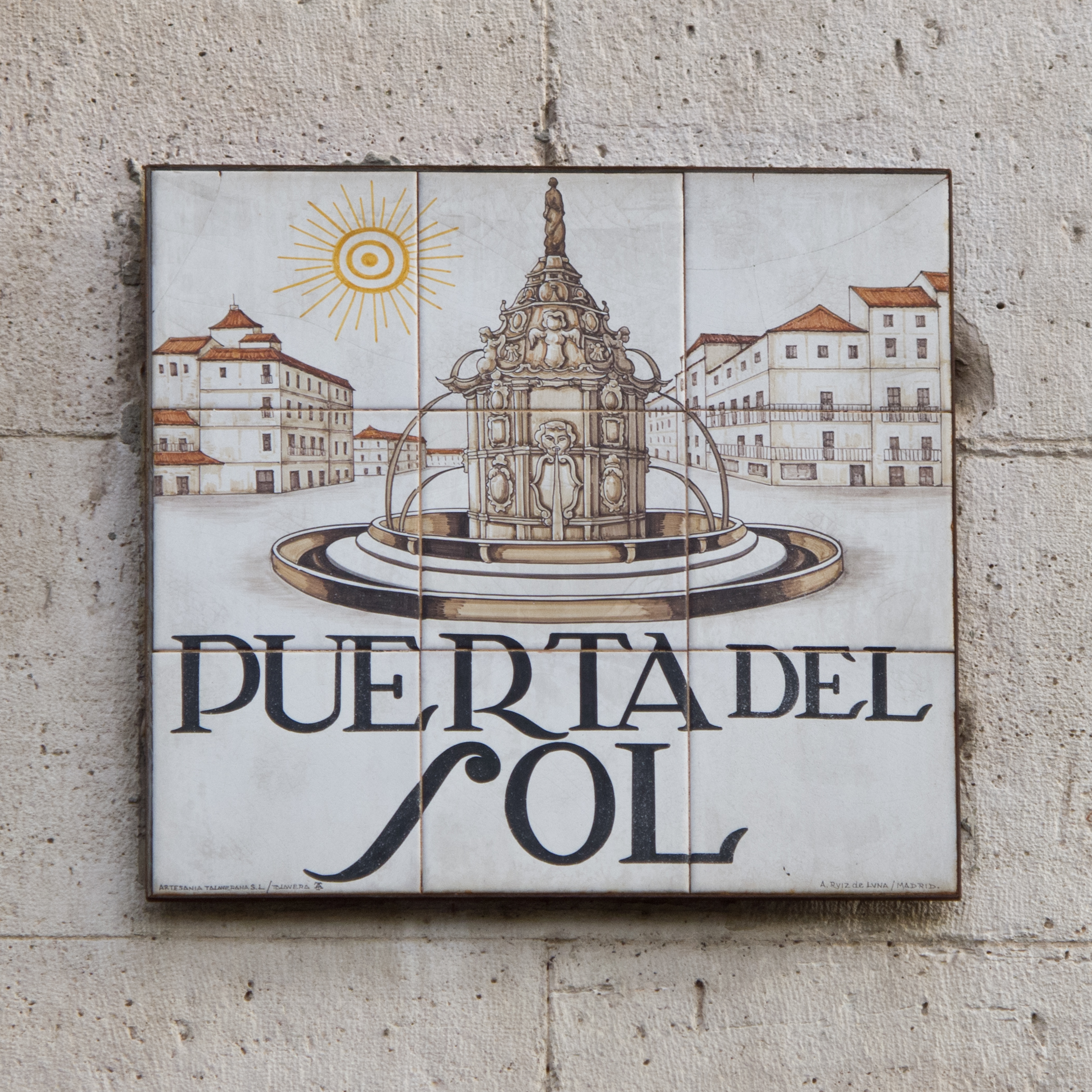
Tiled street-sign of Puerta del Sol with a historic depiction of the square

In the early 16th century, the wall surrounded an area of 70 hectares (170 acres) and had the following eight gates:

- Puerta de la Vega – a remnant of the Muslim Walls
- Puerta de Moros – a gate shared by the Christian Walls
- Puerta de la Latina – There was originally a gate marking the beginning of the road to Toledo (near the present Calle Toledo). It was moved to the Plaza de la Cebada, near the site of the Hospital de la Latina, the current location of the Teatro de la Latina.
- Postigo de San Millán – This gate was located near the present Plaza de Cascorro, off the Calle de San Millán and Duque de Alba, owing its name to a nearby hermitage.
- Puerta de Atocha – This gate was located in the present Plaza de Jacinto Benavente. From here the road to Vallecas led through atochares, the crop fields of Esparto grass.
- Puerta del Sol – This gate was located in the present Plaza de la Puerta del Sol, and was demolished in 1539 or 1570. The name was a reference to its facade which faced east, toward the sunrise.
- Postigo de San Martín – This gate was originally located in the crossing of the current Calle San Martín and Calle Navas de Tolosa. It was later moved to what is now the Plaza del Callao. It took its name from a nearby convent.
- Puerta de Santo Domingo – This gate was located in the present Plaza de Santo Domingo, and was the way out to Hortaleza and the Sierra de Guadarrama. Its name came from the nearby convent of Santo Domingo el Real.

There are no remaining ruins of these walls.

== See also ==
- Walls of Madrid
