= Philip IV =

Philip IV may refer to:

- Philip IV of Macedon (died 297 BC)
- Philip IV of France (1268–1314), Avignon Papacy
- Philip IV of Burgundy or Philip I of Castile (1478–1506)
- Philip IV, Count of Nassau-Weilburg (1542–1602)
- Philip IV of Spain (1605–1665)

== See also ==
- Walls of Philip IV, a City Walls built by Philip IV of Spain in Madrid
