= Puerta de Atocha =

Coordinates: 40°24′24″N 3°41′21″W

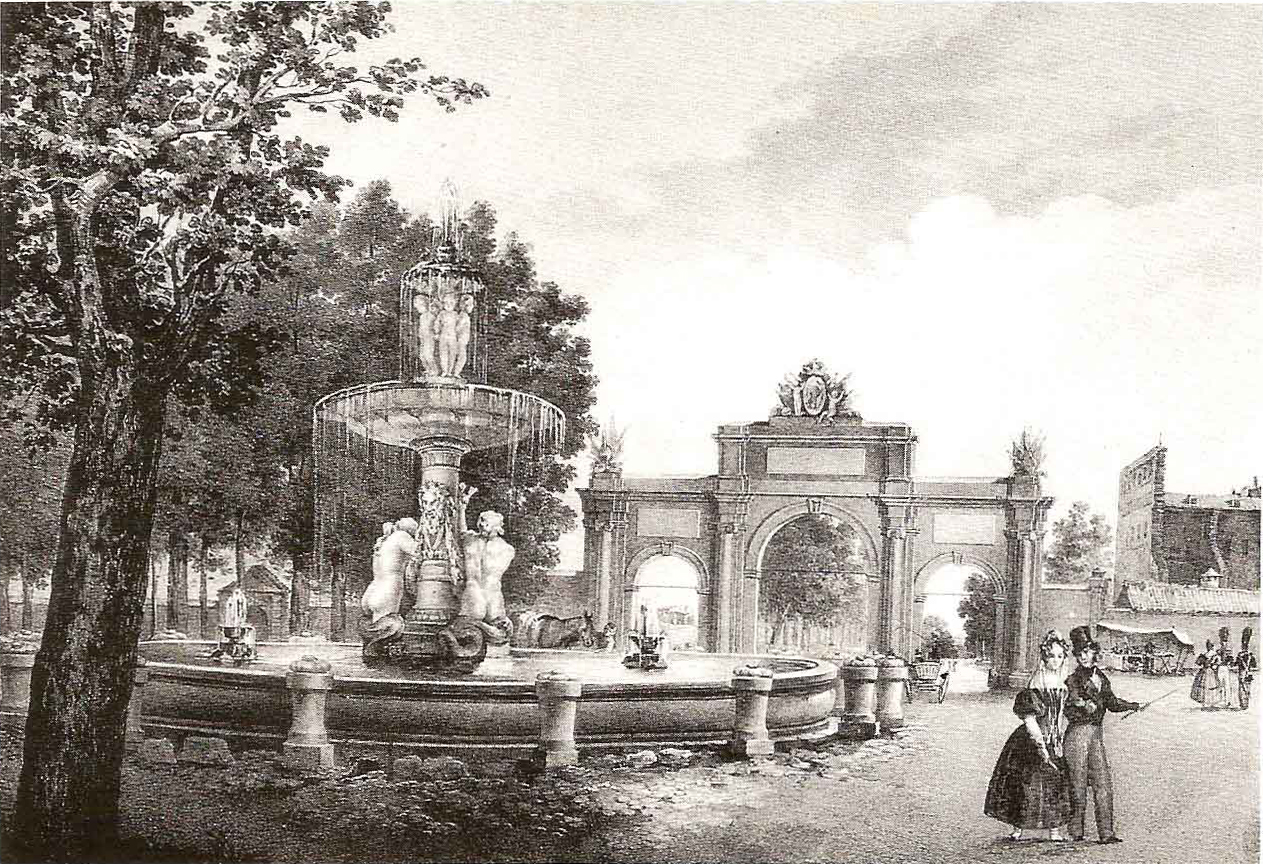
19th-century engraving of the Puerta de Atocha and the existing Fountain de la Alcachofa, both built by Ventura Rodríguez.

The Puerta de Atocha was a gate in the city walls of Madrid (known as the Walls of Philip IV). It owed its name to be located in the vicinity of the old hermitage, later Convento de Nuestra Señora de Atocha. It was demolished in 1850. Its location must exit to Paseo de las Delicias

== Background ==
It was added as part of the Walls of Philip IV in 1748, substituting the previous Puerta de Vallecas. The last gate that was finally demolished in the mid-19th century was built by Ventura Rodríguez in 1769 on a program to improve several of the gates of Madrid, which also were built or improved the gates of Puerta de Alcalá and Puerta de Bilbao, the latter two by Sabatini. However, as described the Diccionario geográfico-estadístico de España y Portugal of Tomás López and Sebastián Miñano in 1826, the gate did not deserve "nor by its matter nor by its form, be one of the main of Madrid and was calling for the construction of a more dignified of the place [sic] in which it is located."

The gate was demolished in 1850 to begin works on the Atocha railway station in 1992, was given to the station the name of Puerta de Atocha to the new terminal of Alta Velocidad Española in honor of the missing gate.
