= Puerta de Toledo =

Gate of Toledo
- Puerta de Toledo (Spanish)
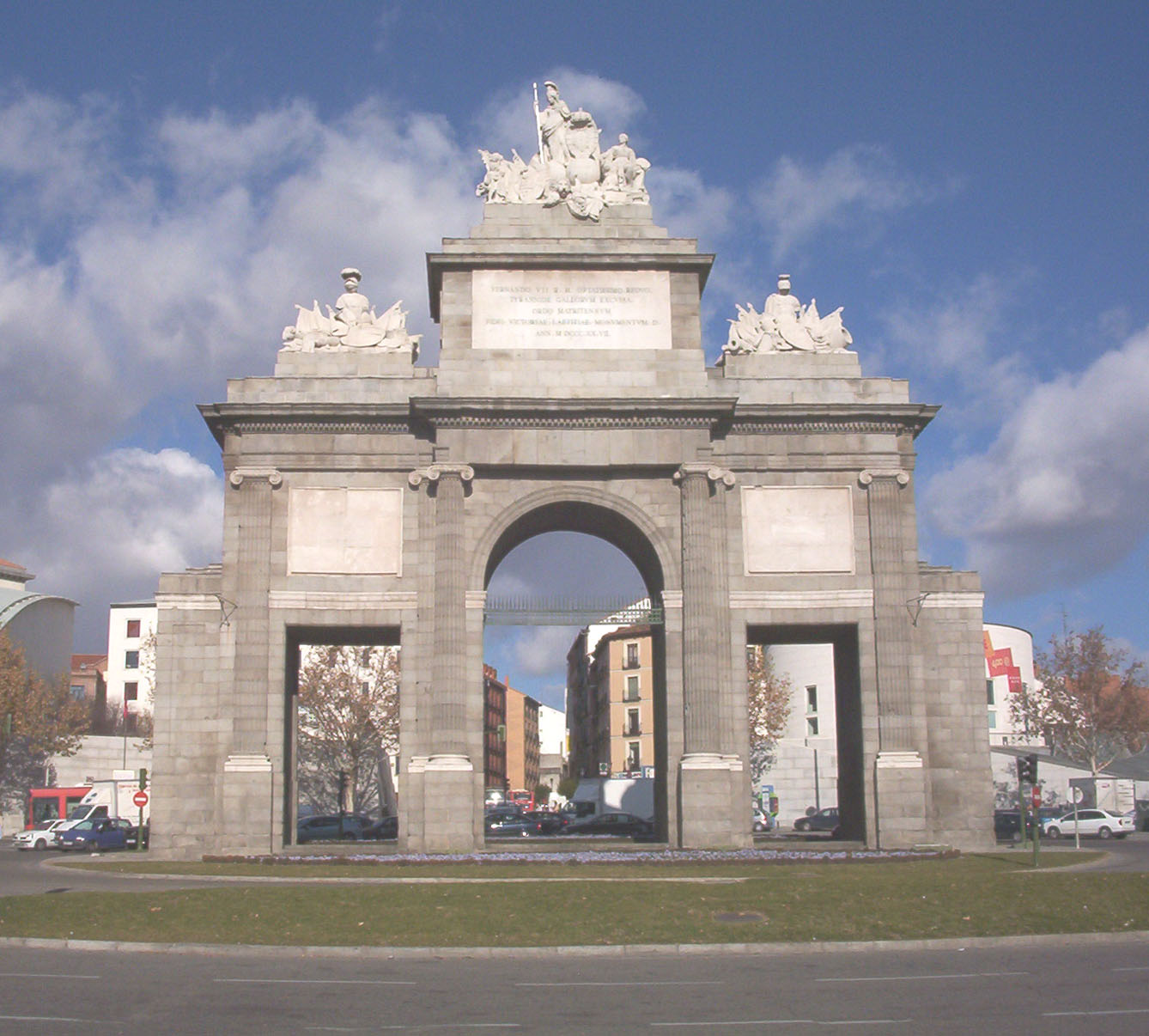

- Location within Madrid
- 40.406721°N 3.711636°W
- Location: Madrid, Spain

Spanish Cultural Heritage
- Official name: Puerta de Toledo
- Type: Non-movable
- Criteria: Monument
- Designated: 1996
- Reference no.: RI-51-0009279

The Puerta de Toledo ([ˈpweɾta ðe toˈleðo], "Toledo Gate") is a gate located in Madrid, Spain. It was declared Bien de Interés Cultural in 1996. Construction began in 1812, but was not completed until 1827.

It was one of the nineteen city gates within the Walls of Philip IV.

Puerta de Toledo metro station in on Line 5 of the Madrid Metro.

== See also ==
- List of post-Roman triumphal arches
