= Calle de Serrano =

Street in Madrid, Spain

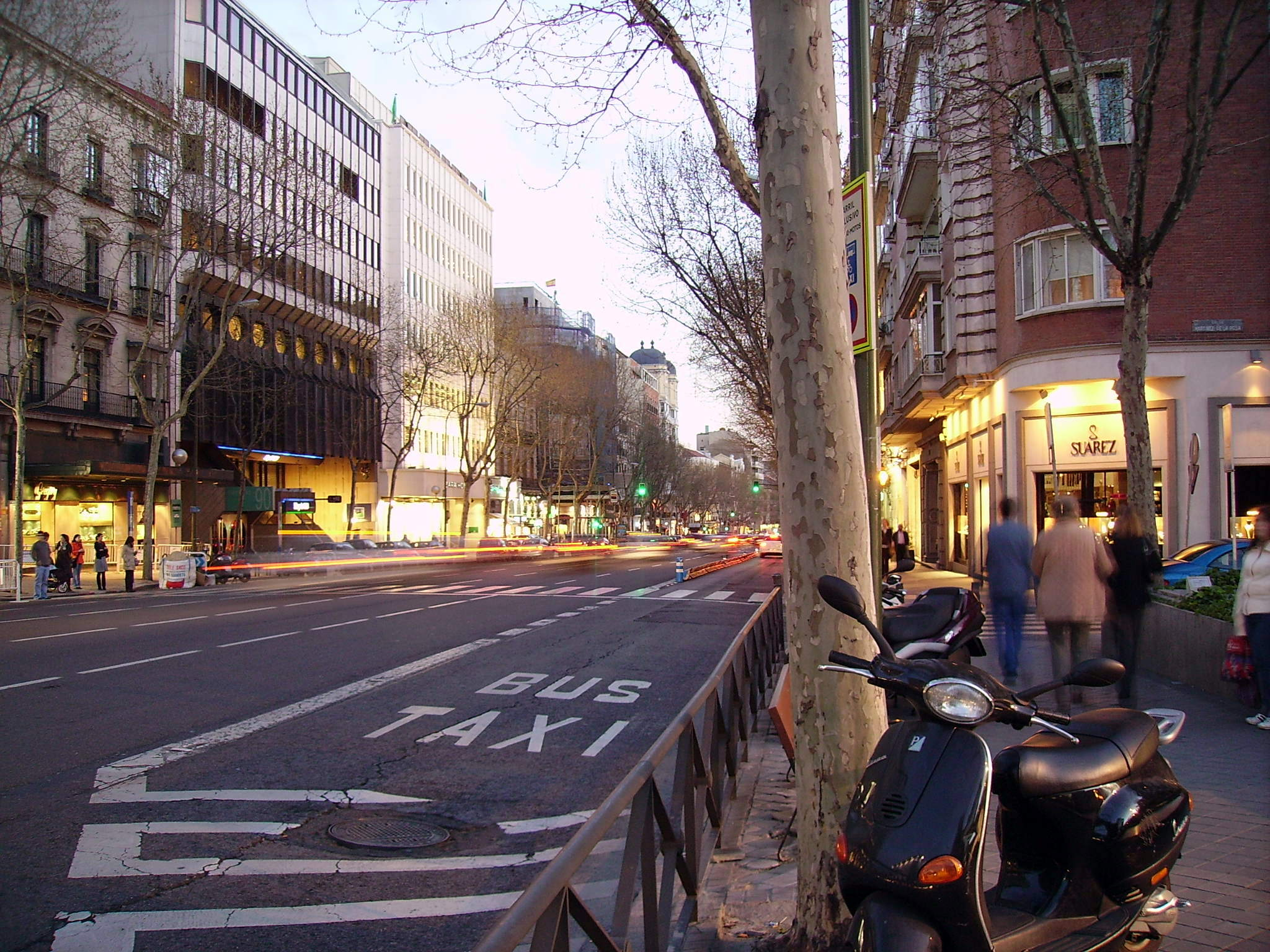
- Interactive map of Calle de Serrano
- Namesake: Francisco Serrano
- Type: street
- Location: Madrid, Spain
- South end: Alcalá Gate
- North end: Plaza de la República del Ecuador

The calle de Serrano, or simply Serrano, is a street in Madrid, Spain known for luxury flagship stores.

The street starts at the Alcalá Gate. Going north across the well-off Salamanca District, historically linked to the upper class and to the presence of luxury stores, Serrano ends at the Plaza de la República del Ecuador, in the junction with the calle del Príncipe de Vergara, in the Chamartín District.

The urbanisation began in 1863 with the construction of the first housing. Initially known as Bulevar Narváez (Narváez Boulevard), the street received its current name following the 1868 Glorious Revolution, during which the namesake, the General Serrano (who had lived in the street), took a leading role. In the 2010s the street became one the favourite grounds for real estate operations of Venezuelan fortunes.
