= Plaza de la Independencia (Madrid) =

Gate and roundabout in Spain

Coordinates: 40°25′12″N 3°41′19″W

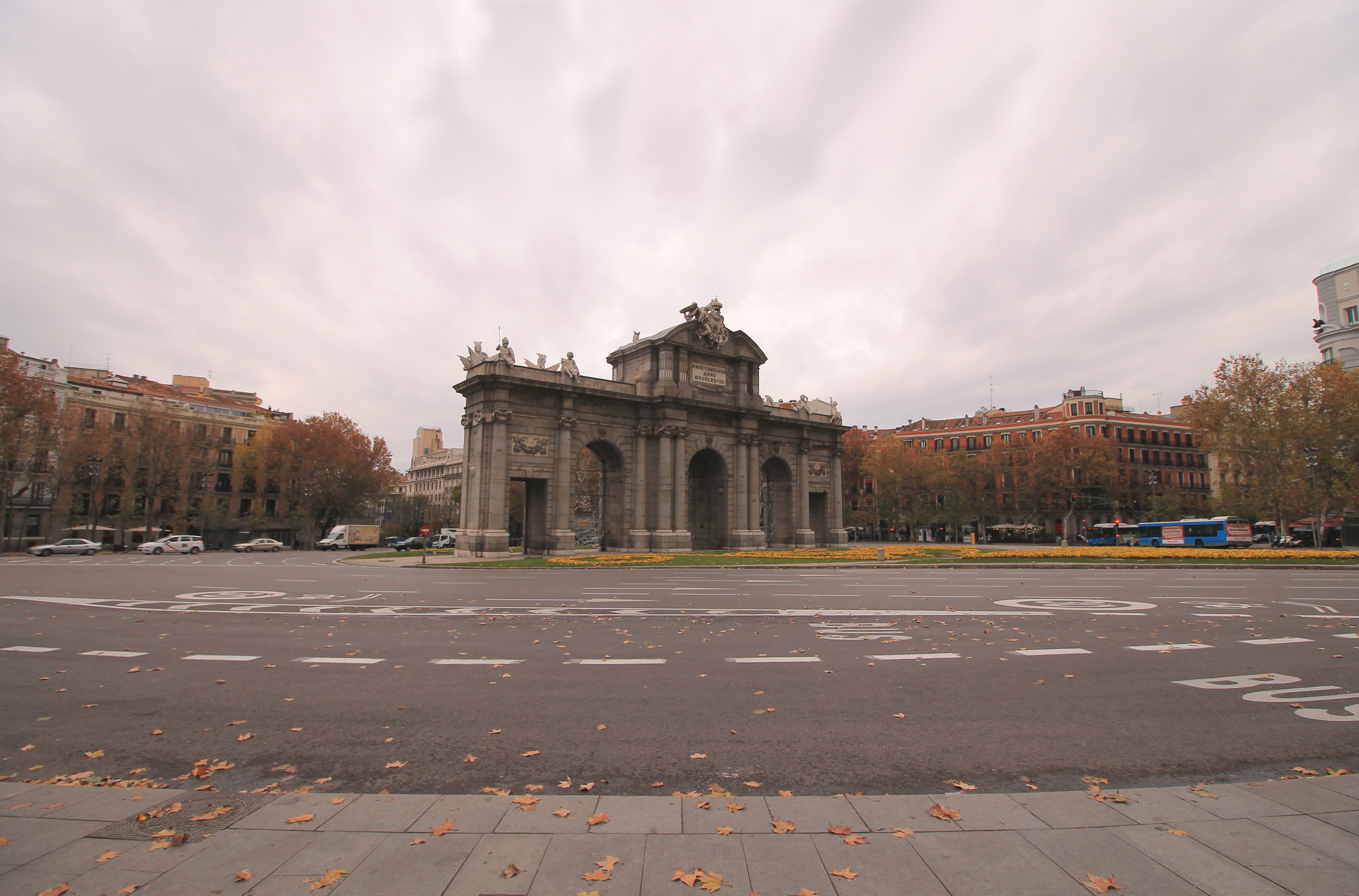
The Alcalá Gate at the centre of the Plaza de la Independencia

The Plaza de la Independencia (Independence Square) is a central roundabout in the Spanish capital, Madrid. It sits at the intersection of Calle de Alcalá (running from east to west), Calle de Alfonso XII (to the south), Calle de Serrano (to the north), Calle de Salustiano Olozaga (to the northwest), and the Paseo de Mexico (to the southeast, running entirely within the Buen Retiro Park).

The 18th-century Alcalá Gate is the primary feature of the plaza, and sits in the middle of its roundabout. The gate is one of the major symbols of the city of Madrid. It is part of the Paseo del Prado y Buen Retiro UNESCO World Heritage Site, and has been described as a second kilometre zero within Madrid.

The gate and plaza were constructed in 1778 during the reign of King Carlos III. It was designed by architect Francesco Sabatini. At that time, it served as an entry/exit gate for the city. However, the current shape of the square dates back to 1869. It is mainly surrounded with buildings from the late nineteenth and early twentieth centuries, built during the expansion of the city of Madrid.
