= Puerta de Alcalá =

Neoclassical gate in Madrid

Coordinates: 40°25′12″N 3°41′20″W

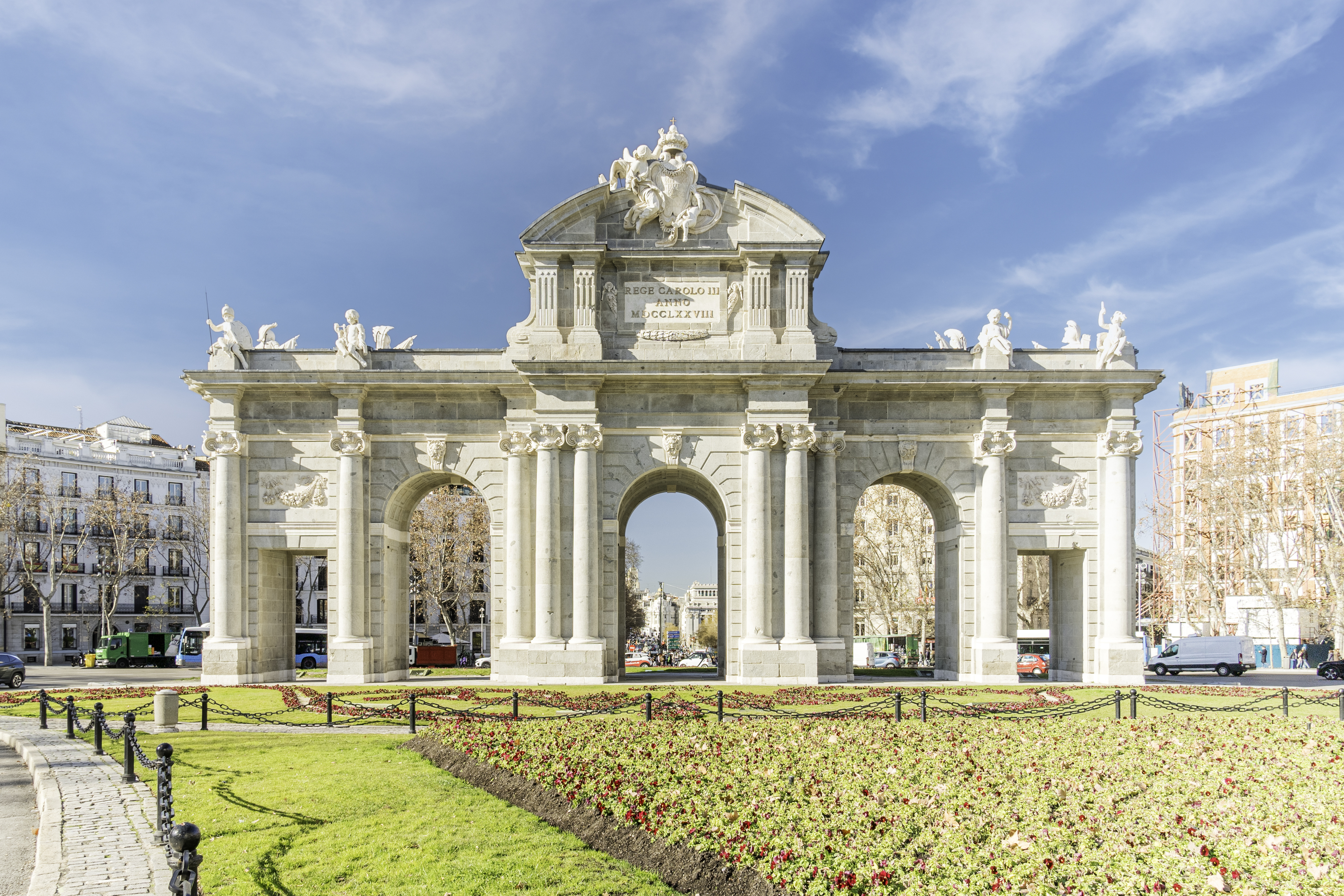
- West side, front view
- Artist: Francesco Sabatini
- Completion date: 1778
- Medium: Granite, limestone
- Movement: Neoclassicism
- Dimensions: 19.50 m × 43.00 m (64.0 ft × 141.08 ft)
- Designation: Bien de Interés Cultural
- Location: Plaza de la Independencia, Madrid, Spain

The Puerta de Alcalá is a Neo-classical gate in the Plaza de la Independencia in Madrid, Spain.

It was a gate of the former Walls of Philip IV. It stands near the city center and several meters away from the main entrance to the Parque del Buen Retiro. The square is bisected by Alcalá Street, although the street does not cross through the monument, and it is the origin of the Alfonso XII, Serrano and Olózaga streets. Its name originates from the old path from Madrid to the nearby town of Alcalá de Henares.

Madrid in the late 18th century still looked like a somewhat drab borough, surrounded by medieval walls. Around the year 1774, King Charles III commissioned Francesco Sabatini to construct a monumental gate in the city wall through which an expanded road to the city of Alcalá was to pass, replacing an older, smaller, gate that stood nearby. It was inaugurated in 1778.

The ornamental details were sculpted by Francisco Gutiérrez and Roberto Michel, and made of white stone from Colmenar. The architectural elements are chiefly made of granite from Segovia.

The central plaque reads rege carolo iii anno mdcclxxviii.

== Notable events ==
- The Puerta de Alcalá was showered by a burst of cannon shrapnel. The marks can still be seen in the present day.
- On 30 July 1854 after having been defeated at Vicálvaro (Madrid), the Count of Villahermosa came into Madrid with a parade wielding as a trophy the spear of an enemy soldier. Madrileños sarcastically nicknamed him “Longinos” for this ostentation (like the Roman soldier, Longinus, whose spear is said to have pierced Christ's side).
- On 8 March 1921, at 20:20, the Prime Minister of Spain, Eduardo Dato, was driving his car home through Plaza de la Independencia after a long session at the parliament, when three Catalan anarchists driving a grey motorcycle with side-car shot him with a handgun. Dato was promptly driven to the Casa de Socorro hospital, but was dead on arrival.
- Since the Alcalá Street (crossing through the square) was considered a cañada real (special route for the seasonal migration of livestock), sheep flocks regularly crossed through the Puerta de Alcalá. The practice is now in disuse.
- During May and June 2001, the Puerta de Alcalá underwent a transformation in honour of Madrid being named the "Capital Mundial del Libro" (World Book Capital). Several gardens were added to the square, surrounding the monument, and beautiful night lights were added.
- In 1985, Spanish singers Ana Belén and Víctor Manuel popularised the song "La Puerta de Alcalá", one of their greatest hits, titled after this monument.
- During the 2010 MTV Europe Music Awards, Thirty Seconds to Mars, Katy Perry and Linkin Park were featured live from the Puerta de Alcalá. Performing in front of close to 100,000 fans, Perry performed her single "Firework", with a pyrotechnics display. Linkin Park performed a set which was shot in its entirety for MTV World Stage, to be broadcast on MTV platforms around the world on 10 December 2010.
- The song "La Puerta de Alcalá" has also been covered by Mexican singer Anahí and Spanish singer David Bustamante and is included in her sixth album, Inesperado.
- On 2 June 2017, the closing ceremony and concert of WorldPride 2017 took place at Puerta de Alcalá.
