= Arrabal of Saint Martin =

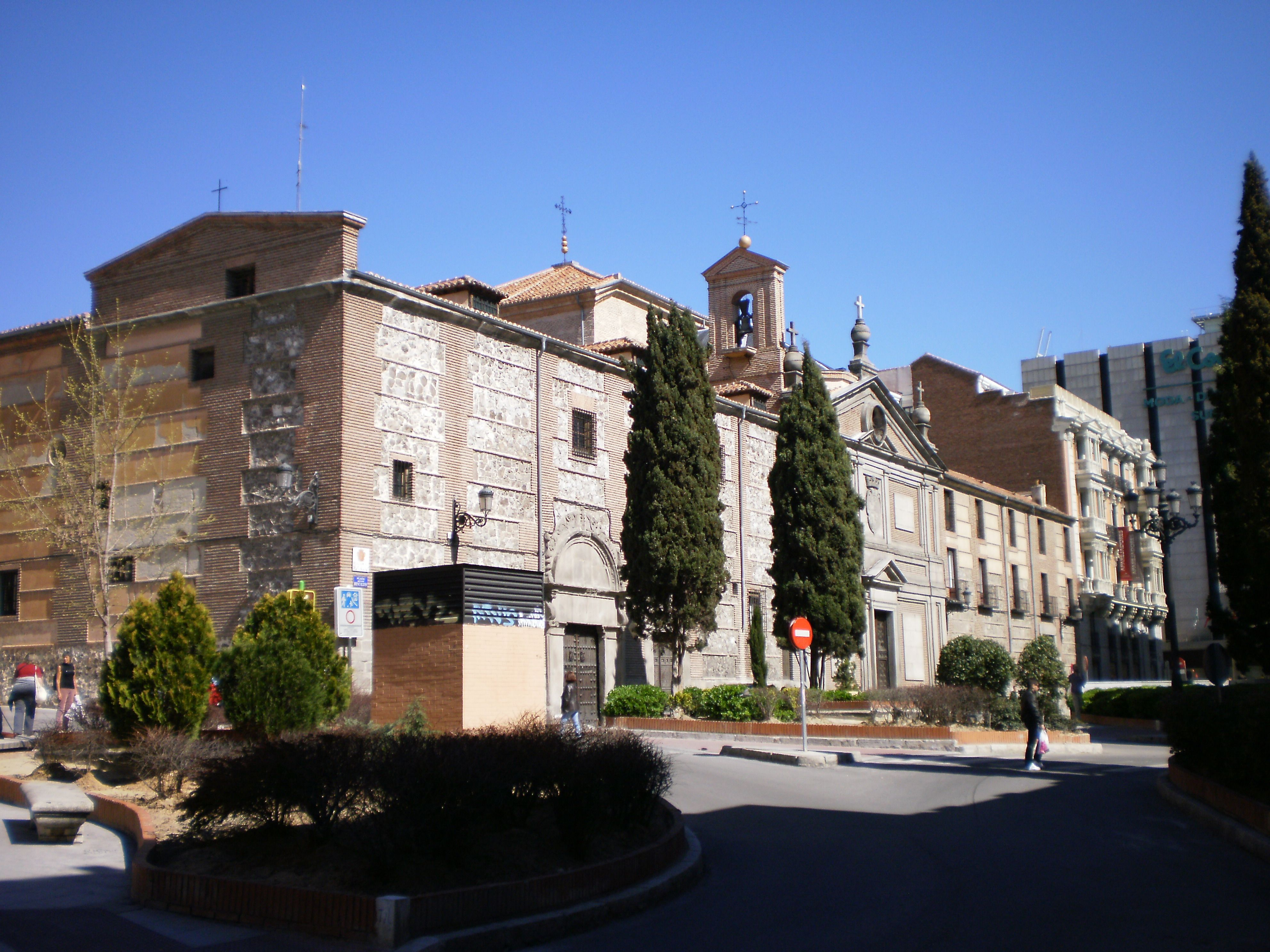
The Convent of Las Descalzas Reales was the center of the arrabal.

The Arrabal of Saint Martin (Spanish: Arrabal de San Martín) was a medieval arrabal (neighborhood) that sat outside the Christian Walls of Madrid. It was located around the location of the current Plaza of San Martín, and occupied the space between Calle del Arenal, the Plaza de las Descalzas, Plaza del Callao, and Calle de las Navas de Tolosa. It grew as a population center around the Monastery of Saint Martin (adjacent to the Convent of Las Descalzas Reales), neighboring San Martín was the Arrabal of San Ginés, and both were absorbed by the growth of the city in the 17th century.

== Background ==
Writer Ramón de Mesonero Romanos, found the first references to the suburb of San Martín as one of the first suburbs of the city around the year 1126, placing it on the outskirts of the Valnadú Gate.

The founding of the arrabal, as a small pueblo, was prompted by the founding of the Benedictine Monastery of Saint Martin, a Mozarabic priory subject to the Abbey of Santo Domingo de Silos and originally outside the town of Madrid and its authority. This is clear from the text of the "municipal charter" granted in 1126 by Alfonso VII of Castile to the prior of the vicus Sancti Martini similar to the privileges granted to the convents of Silos and Sahagún. The charter granted the prior civil, criminal and ecclesiastical jurisdiction, both within of the abbey as on the inhabitants of the arrabal. (Note: Every settler was subject to the authority of the prior of the Monastery of Saint Martin and none of its inhabitants could build a house or cultivate a field without his permission. Residents were free to leave but only by selling their inheritance, with the convent holding the first right of refusal.) In 1295 Sancho IV of Castile confirmed the privileges of the monastery, until between 1465 and 1480 the entire dependent population was integrated into the jurisdiction of the Council of Madrid.

In the middle of the 16th century, the aforementioned monastery of the Descalzas Reales, next to the Monastery of Saint Martin, built in 1559 by the architect Antonio Sillero, on the site previously occupied by an old palace.

== See also ==
- Walls del Arrabal

== Bibliography ==
- Castellanos Oñate, José Manuel (2005). El Madrid de los Reyes Católicos (in Spanish). Madrid: La Librería. ISBN 8496470105.
- Montero Vallejo, Manuel (1990). Madrid musulmán, cristiano y bajomedieval (in Spanish). Madrid: Avapiés. ISBN 8486280443.
- Gea, María Isabel [in Spanish] (2006). Guía del plano de Texeira (1656) (in Spanish). Madrid: La Librería. ISBN 9788496470453.
- Gea, María Isabel [in Spanish] (2002). Diccionario enciclopédico de Madrid (in Spanish). Madrid: La Librería. ISBN 8495889099.
- Gea, María Isabel [in Spanish] (2003). El Madrid desaparecido. Madrid: Ediciones La Librería. ISBN 8495889471.
- Mesonero Romanos, Ramón de [in Spanish] (1861). El antiguo Madrid. Paseos histórico-anecdóticos por las calles y casas de esta villa (primera parte) (PDF) (in Spanish) (2010 ed.). Madrid: edición facsímil de Trigo Ediciones. ISBN 9788489787414.
