= San Ginés, Madrid =

Church of San Ginés de Arlés
- Iglesia de San Ginés de Arlés (Spanish)
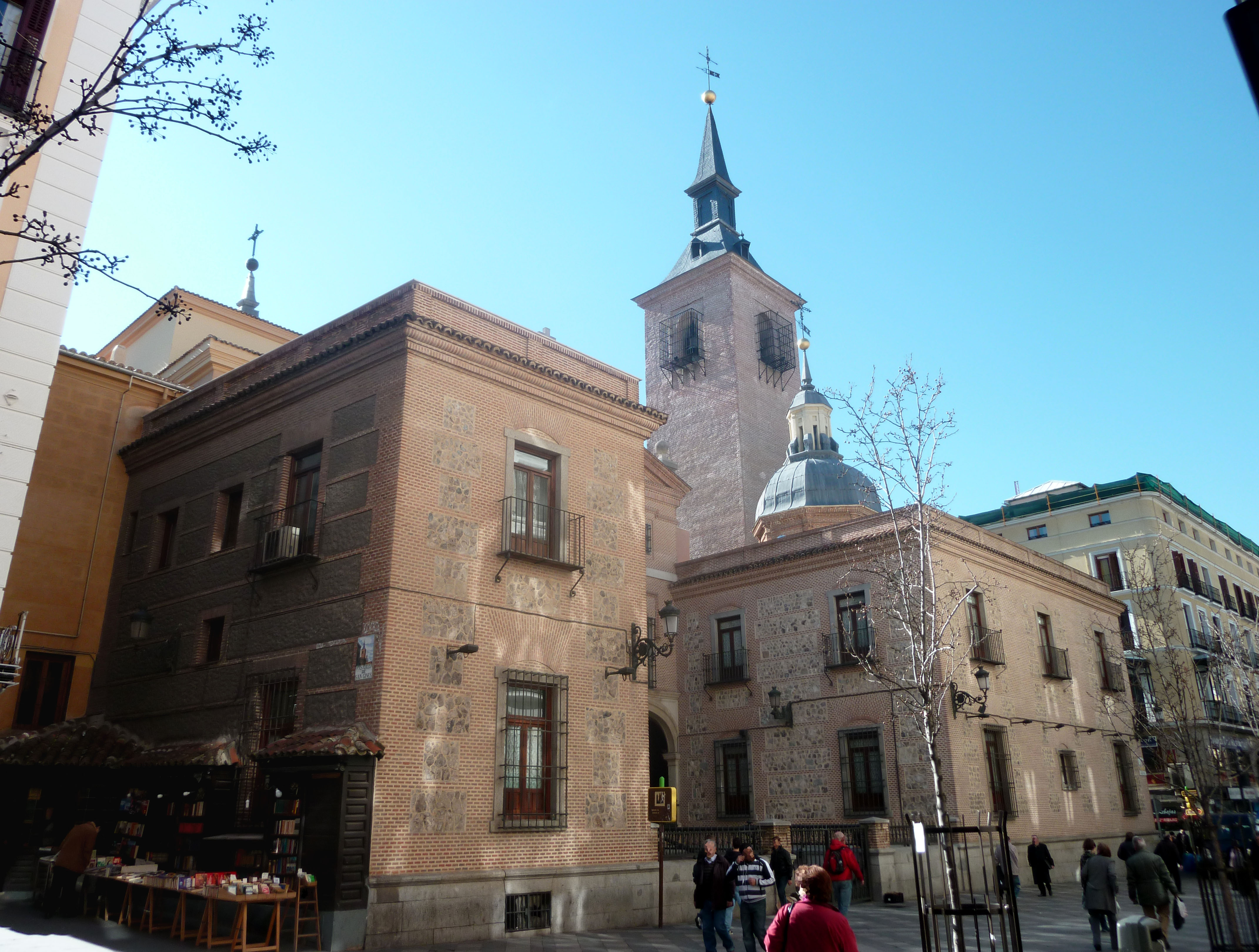

- Location within Spain
- 40.41713°N 3.70691°W
- Location: Madrid, Spain

Spanish Cultural Heritage
- Official name: Iglesia de San Ginés de Arlés
- Type: Non-movable
- Criteria: Monument
- Designated: 1982
- Reference no.: RI-51-0004564

The church of San Ginés (Spanish: iglesia de San Ginés de Arlés) is one of the oldest churches in Madrid. It is situated on the Calle Arenal. References to it appear in documents dating from the ninth century. Originally built in Mudéjar style (of the structure only the campanile survives), it was rebuilt in 1645.

== History ==
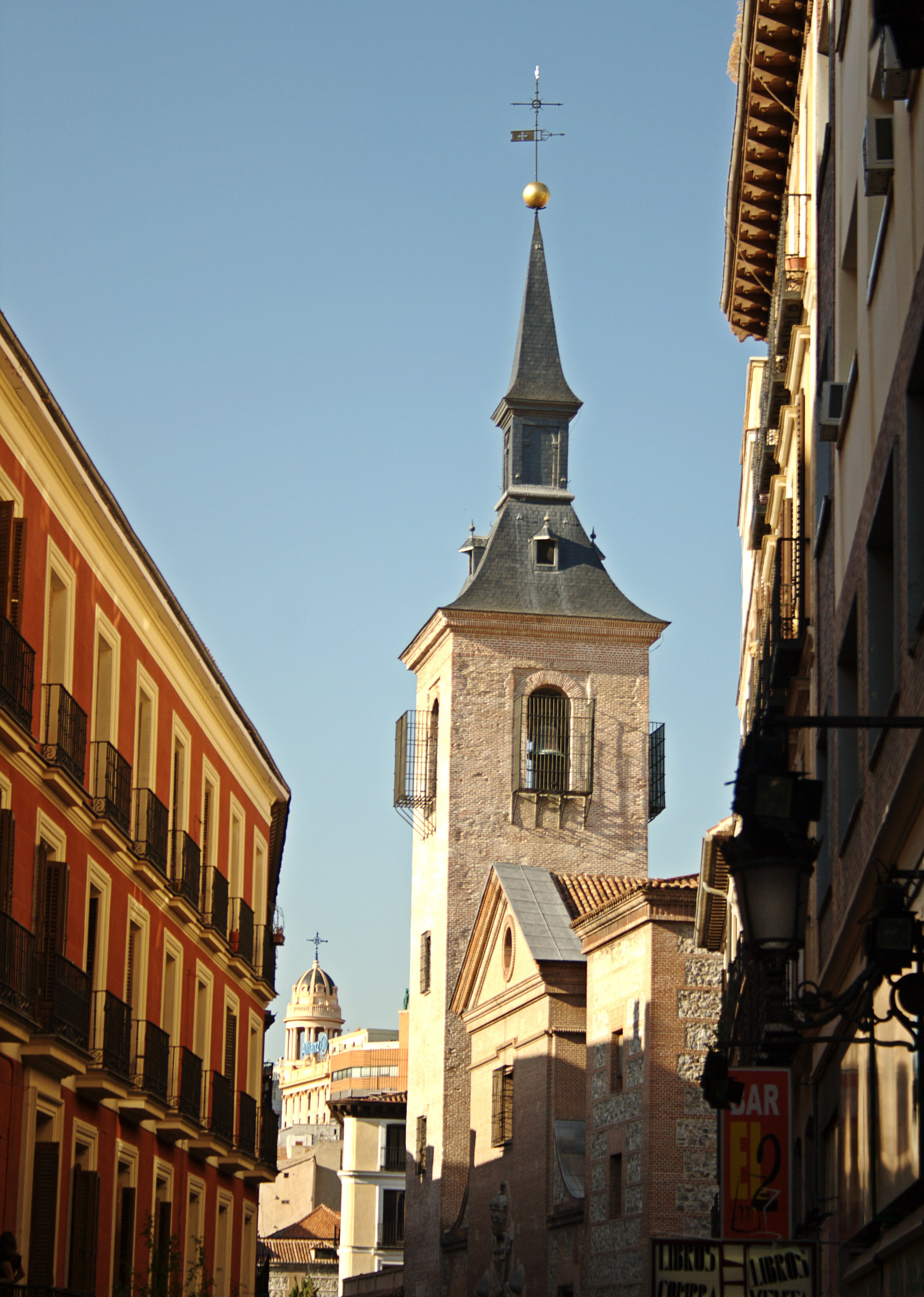
Belfry of the San Ginés Church.

The church was one of the churches of medieval Madrid, of Mozarab origin, from between the 12th and 13th centuries. Its name comes from the fact that it was dedicated to the patron saint of notaries and secretaries, Saint Genesius of Arles (San Ginés de Arlés).

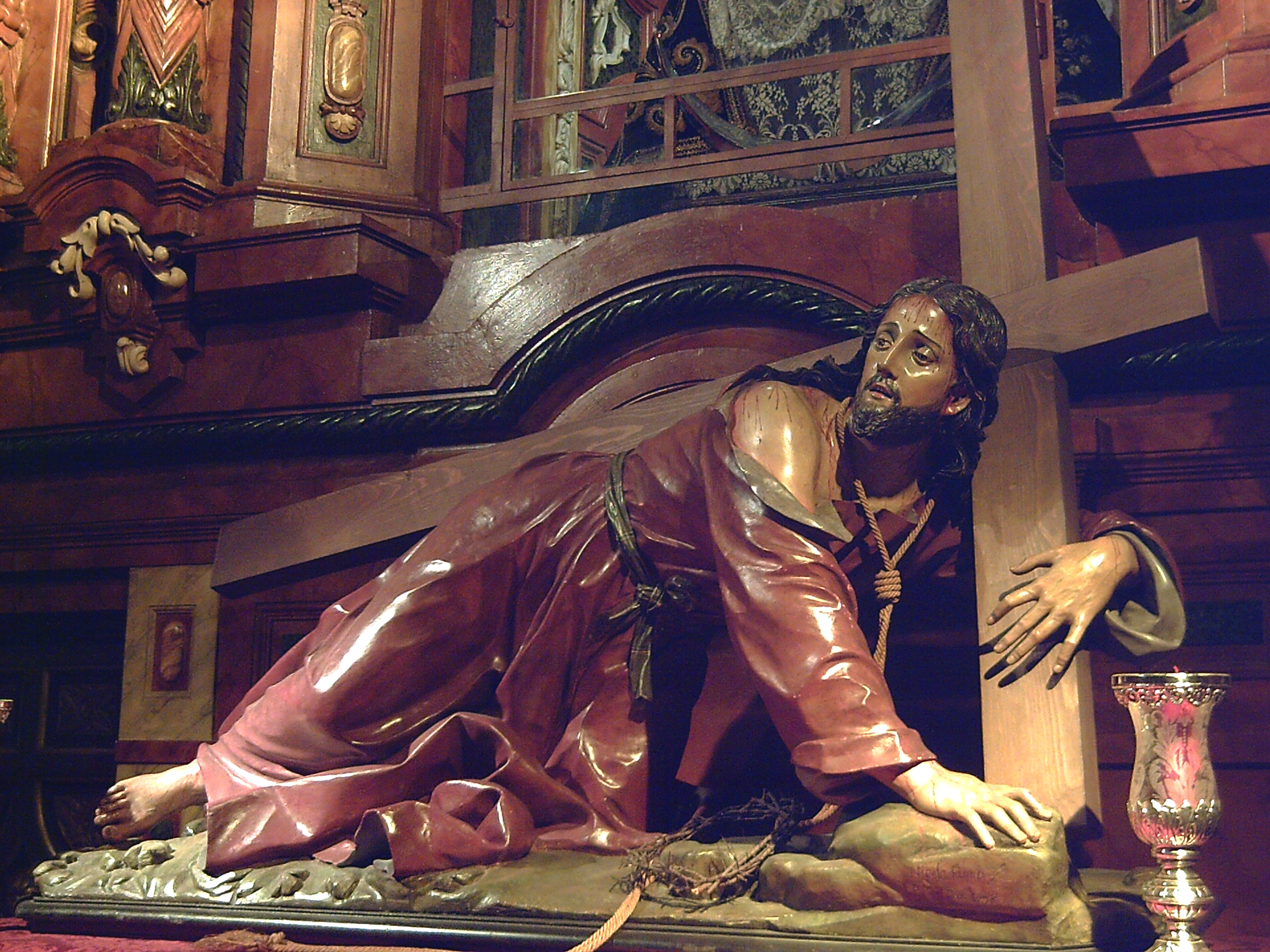
Fallen Christ (1698), designed by Nicolò Fumo.

It was declared Bien de Interés Cultural in 1982.

== Description ==
The church is preceded by an atrium enclosed by railings. It has a Latin cross plan, with a nave and two aisles separated by semicircular arches and several side chapels and the altarpieces belong to the Neoclassical-Romantic school. It was, however, reconstructed after suffering several fires, so few remnants of the original church, such as the bell-tower, remain. In 1870, the loggia and atrium were added. The tower has a beautiful Madrid-style slate spire that incorporates great verticality into the construction.

In the Santísimo Cristo Chapel there are artworks by Alonso Cano, Luca Giordano and El Greco.

In fact, the painting by El Greco is not to be found in the chapel of the Santísimo; it is situated in the main church, but covered by wood. In 2009 the church acquired The lamentation by Michiel Coxie.

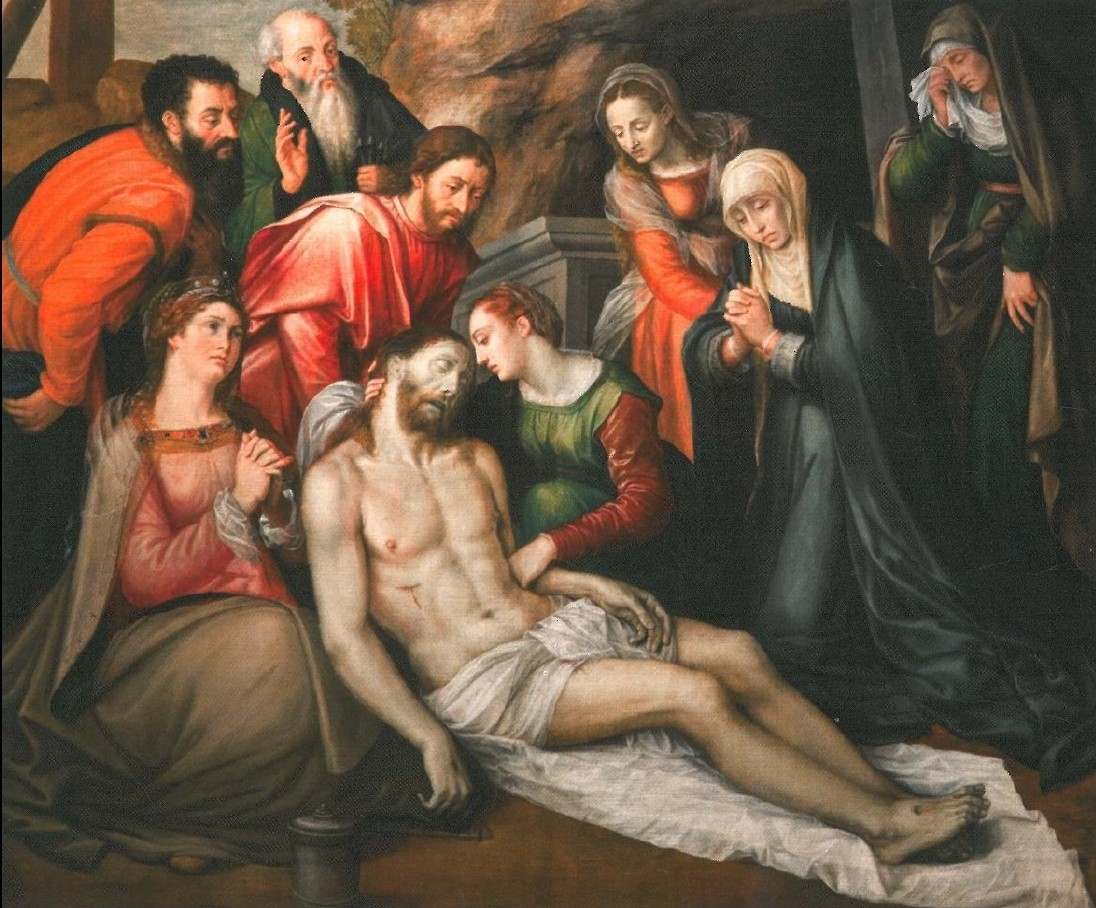
The lamentation by Michiel Coxie

== Notes ==
Lope de Vega, the dramatist (playwright) and writer, married there, while poet Francisco de Quevedowas baptized there. The death certificate of Tomás Luis de Victoria can also be found in its archives.

One of the most curious items on display is a stuffed crocodile, which is said to have been brought over from the Americas during the reign of the Catholic Monarchs.

== See also ==
- Catholic Church in Spain
- List of oldest church buildings
