= Campo del Moro =

Park in Madrid, Spain

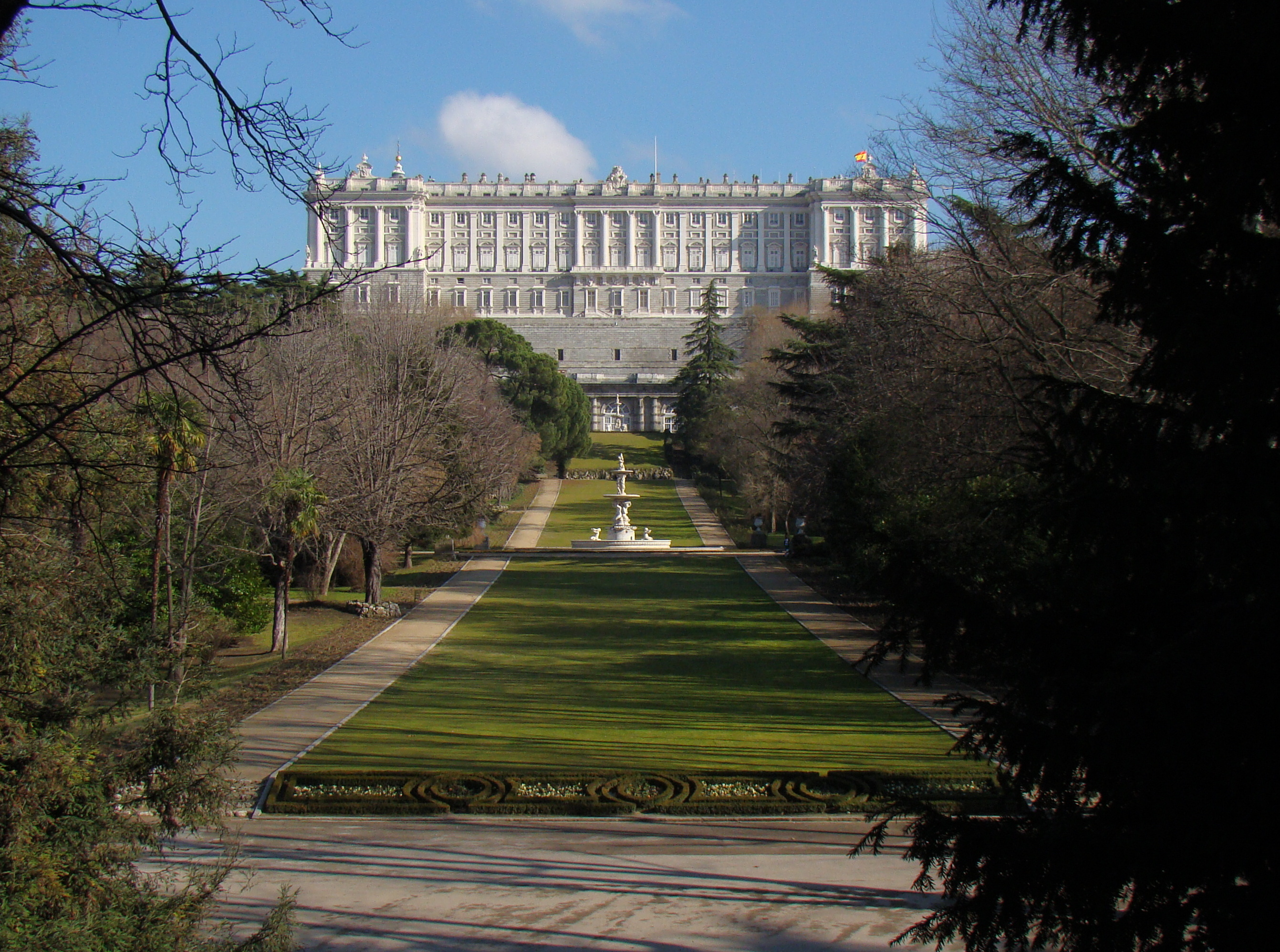
- Campo del Moro
- Interactive map of Campo del Moro
- Coordinates: 40.4182°N 3.7191°W

Spanish Cultural Heritage
- Type: Non-movable
- Criteria: Historic Garden
- Designated: 3 June 1931
- Reference no.: RI-52-0000003

Campo del Moro is a park in Madrid, Spain. It was designed in the 19th century under the rule of Queen Maria Cristina, thus creating a garden with a clear English style and following the romanticism of nature. One of the difficulties presented by the enormous garden was the difference in height with the Royal Palace, which is why it was not designed before. However, today it is one of the most beautiful landscapes of the Spanish capital. It is named after a 12th century episode in which the Muslim general Ali Ben Yusuf wanted to reconquer Madrid with the death of King Alfonso VI by attacking the Fortress from the banks of the Manzanares River. The Muslim troops occupied this space to settle during the confrontation.
