= Calle de la Montera =

Pedestrian street in Madrid, Spain

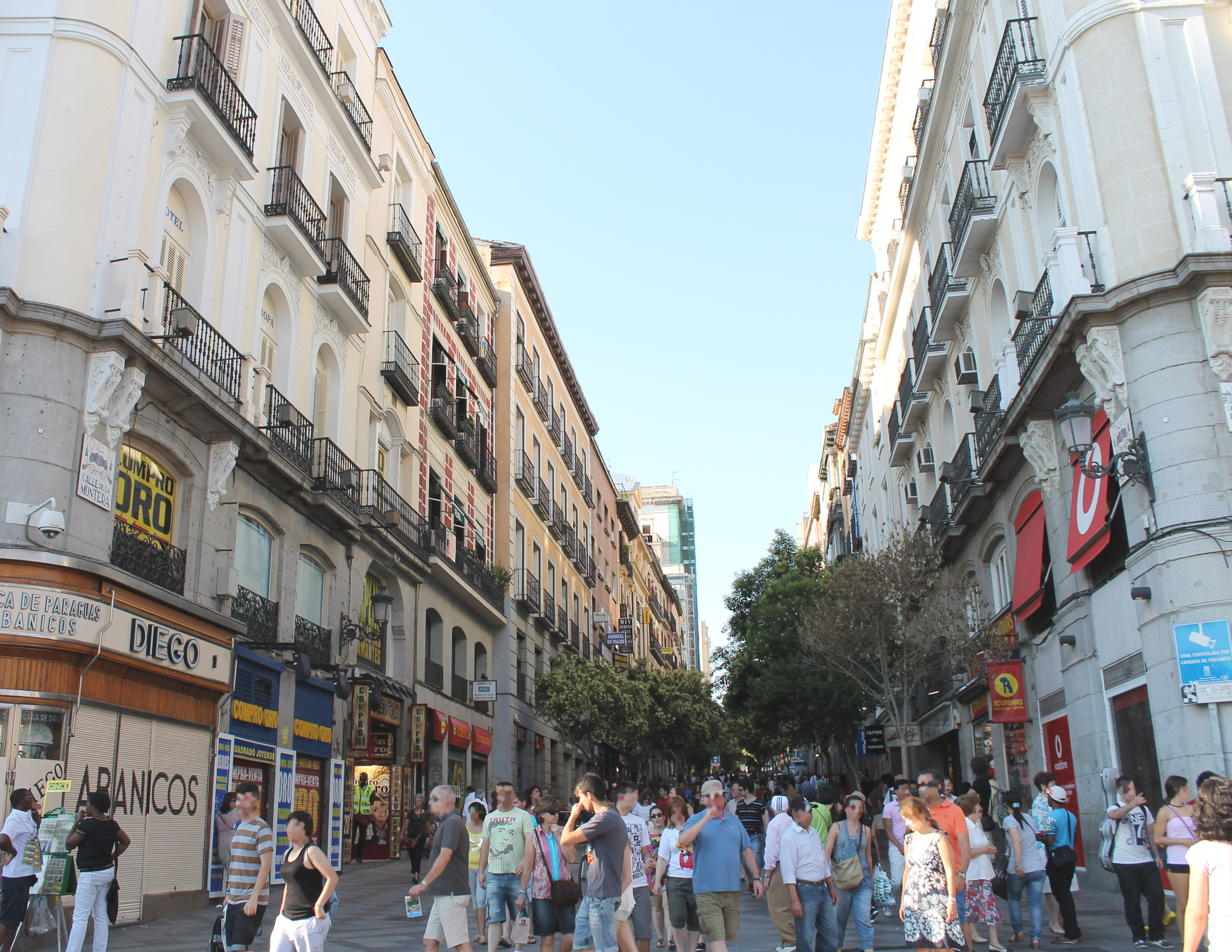
- View from the Puerta del Sol
- Interactive map of Calle de la Montera
- Type: pedestrian street
- Location: Madrid, Spain
- South end: Puerta del Sol
- North end: Gran Vía

The Calle de la Montera is a pedestrian street in the centre of Madrid. Starting from the south, it links the Puerta del Sol and the so-called Red de San Luis (the junction with the Gran Vía). It presents a south-north positive slope.

All its path falls within the limits of the Sol neighborhood, in turn part of the Centro District of the Spanish capital.

== History ==
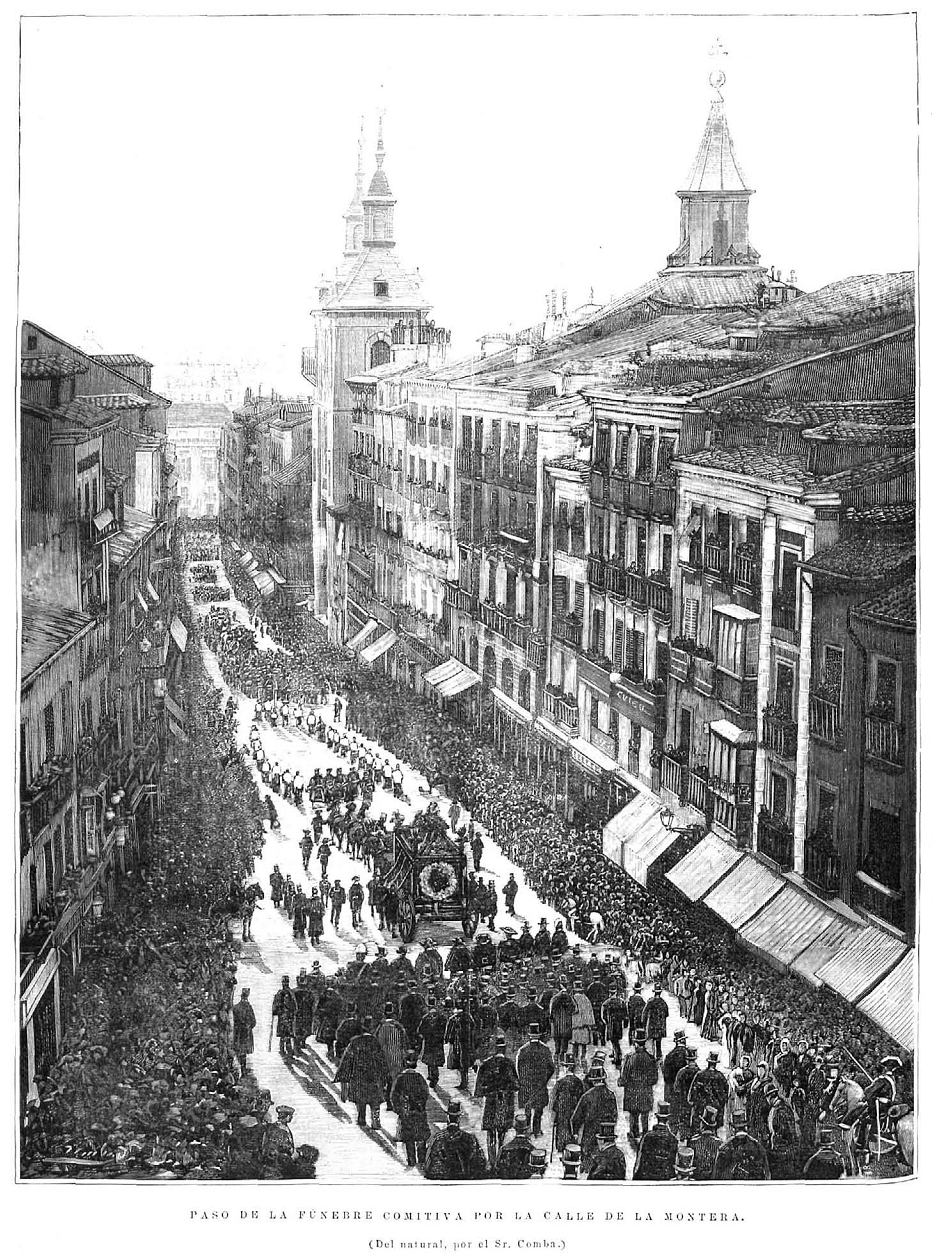
The street in 1893, including the San Luis Obispo Church before its destruction

The popular folklore is fertile in bringing explanations for the name of the street. However the reason for the name is the house of Juan Carlos and Francisco Lamontera, documented to exist in the area by the mid 16th century.

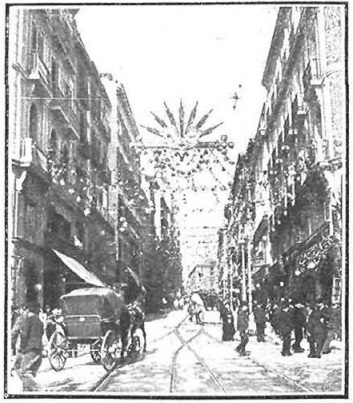
Photographed by Campúa in 1905

By the end of the 17th century the Church of San Luis Obispo was built in the street.

During the 18th century Montera was a luxury street. The writer Valle Inclán set in 1920 an scene of his play Bohemian Lights in the street; the place where the "taberna Pica Lagartos" was located. The onset of the 20th century saw the street becoming one of the main commercial streets in the city centre, with a plethora of merceries, shirt-shops, other textile stores, jewellery and shoe-stores. Parts of the street were affected by the construction of the Gran Vía, whose works started in 1910. During the 20th century the upper segment of the street also became known by the visible street prostitution, gaining a long-lasting reputation in that regard.

The Church of San Luis Obispo suffered a fire in March 1936 that led to its destruction, with the complete demolition taking place in 1943.

More recently CCTV control was installed in the area. The street was pedestrianised in two steps: first the segment between the Puerta del Sol to Aduana Street in 2006. The process was completed in 2009. With the street having several business premises closed during the 21st century, by the end of the decade of 2010 the impending gentrification of the city-centre began to considerably increase the interest for real estate in the street.

A rare surviving example of work by the pioneering flechero artist Muelle was restored in 2016 and can be seen on a wall of the street.

In August 2018 works towards the creation of a pedestrian underground connection between the Metro stations of Sol and Gran Vía passing below the street started.
