= Muslim Walls of Madrid =

Cultural property in Madrid, Spain

Coordinates: 40.4148°N 3.7157°W

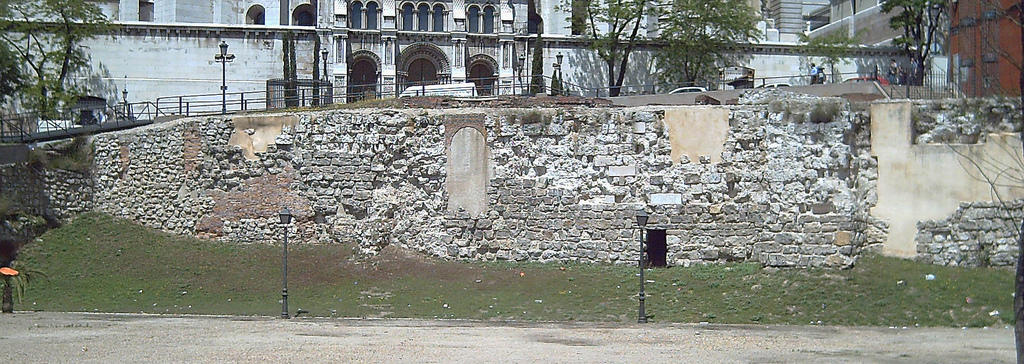
Overview of the remains preserved on Cuesta de la Vega, near the crypt of the La Almudena Cathedral.

The Muslim Walls of Madrid (also known as the Arab Walls of Madrid), of which some vestiges remain, are located in the Spanish capital city of Madrid. They are probably the oldest construction extant in the city. They were built in the 9th century, during the Muslim domination of the Iberian Peninsula, on a promontory next to Manzanares river. They were part of a fortress around which developed the urban nucleus of Madrid. They were declared an Artistic-Historic Monument in 1954.

They were built in the park of Mohamed I, named in reference to Muhammad I of Córdoba, considered the founder of the city.

Along the Calle Mayor street, at number 83, next to the Viaduct that serves the Calle de Segovia, are still standing the ruins of the Tower of Narigües, which probably would have been an albarrana tower, with a separate location from the main wall itself, but connected thereto by a minor wall. Its function was to serve as a viewpoint.

In the 20th century, some remains were destroyed. Those that once existed near number 12 Calle de Bailén were lost during the construction of an apartment block, although some walls were integrated into its foundations. The remodelling of the Plaza de Oriente, completed in 1996 during the mayoral term of José María Álvarez del Manzano, led to the discovery and subsequent disappearance of numerous remains. This was not the case with the watchtower known as Tower of the Bones, whose base is on display in the underground car park of the same plaza.

Between 1999 and 2000, another section was uncovered, about 70 metres (230 ft) long, under the Plaza de la Armería, formed by the main façades of the Royal Palace and Almudena Cathedral. It was excavated during the building of the Royal Collections Gallery (to open in 2023) and may correspond to the Puerta de la Sagra, one of the gates to the walled enclosure.

== Historical context ==
=== Walled enclosures in Al-Andalus ===
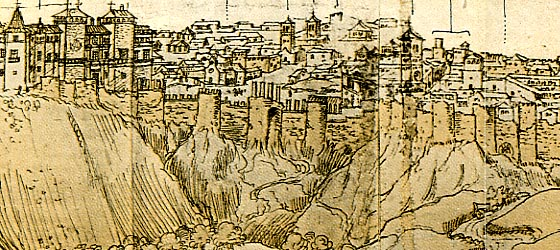
Detail drawing by Anton van den Wyngaerde in 1562, in which is seen the Muslim Walls of Madrid, from the disappeared Alcázar to the left, to the gate Puerta de la Vega, to the right.

As Torres Balbás says, "Islamization was a uniform urban mold, the result of a way of life." For example, the finding of winding streets corresponds to a context in which defense is a fundamental necessity.

With respect to the Walls, they fulfill several functions. Muslim cities have medinas at their cores, which include, among other buildings, the main mosque and the hammam. They are surrounded by walls, giving the area within defensive, symbolic and administrative functions. In Madrid, similarly, the walls were built to protect the city's core, not only from external danger, but also from internal revolts in the suburbs (also possibly walled). The differentiation of spaces produced by the walls, thanks to the gates - three in this case - also aided tax collection.

Thus, the city was divided between the medina or center of religious and commercial life, and the rabad, the "populous neighborhoods outside the walls". From a planning point of view, the walls promoted urbanism through both their gates and their path: the gates because through them ran the more heavily-trafficked streets and the layout because the neighborhoods would range around it.

Many examples show the different possibilities when building walls, from the materials used to various designs to suit the terrain.

=== Medieval Madrid ===
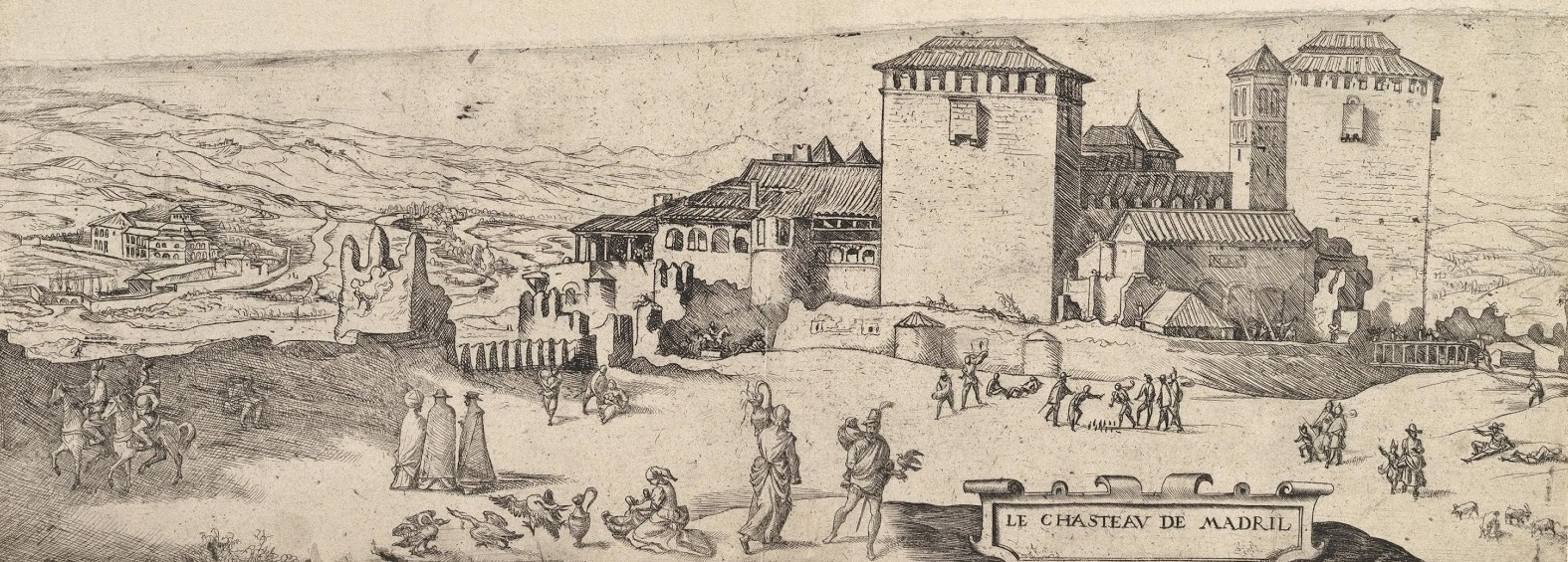
Drawing of the Royal Alcázar of Madrid of J. Cornelius Vermeyenen, made around 1534-1535. On the left side it can be observed that part of the Muslim Walls, in the 16th century, were in a visible state of deterioration.

The construction of these Walls is directly linked to the origin of Madrid. They were ordered to be built by the Córdoban emir Muhammad I (852 - 886) on an unspecified date between the years 860 and 880, according to a text of al-Himyari. It was in an area not chosen by chance. It was a wide cultivated valley, with easy access to water reserves. It defended the almudaina or Muslim citadel of Mayrit (first name of the city), located on the site currently occupied by the Royal Palace.

According to Muslim chroniclers of the time, high quality construction and materials were used to build the Walls. The historian Jerónimo de Quintana echoed these accounts in the following text of the 17th century: "very strong of masonry and mortar, raised and thick, twelve feet [almost three and half meters] in width, with large cubes, towers gatehouses and moats".

The mission of the fortified complex was to monitor the path of the Manzanares, which connected the steppes of the Sierra de Guadarrama with Toledo, threatened by the incursions of the Christian kingdoms of the north peninsula. It was governed as a ribat or community, simultaneously both religious and military.

The Walls of Mayrit were integrated within a complex defensive system, which extended through different parts of the Community of Madrid. These included Talamanca de Jarama, Qal'-at'-Abd-Al-Salam (Alcalá de Henares) and Qal'-at-Jalifa (Villaviciosa de Odón). However, do not think of Mayrit as a core of a large entity, but as one of many entities -so is it that sometimes is difficult to find references to the city in the chronicles-.

In the 10th century, the caliph of Córdoba Abd-ar-Rahman III ordered the reinforcement of the Walls, after suffering several situations of danger from the advance of the Christian King Ramiro II of León in 932. In the year 977, Almanzor chose the fortress of Mayrit as the origin point of his military campaign.

With the Christian conquest of Mayrit in the 9th century, the original walled area was expanded, raising one of wider perimeter, known as the Christian Walls of Madrid. Thus, the Madrilenian core did not lose its defensive function at any time.

The image of the Virgin of Almudena, Spanish: Santa María la Real de la Almudena, lit. 'Saint Mary the Royal of la Almudena', formerly called Spanish: Santa María la Mayor, lit. 'Saint Mary the Great', was found in 1085 (three centuries after the Christians hid it from Muslims) in the conquest of the city by King Alfonso VI of León and Castile, in one of the hubs of the Walls, near the gate Puerta de la Vega, and placed in the old mosque, for the worship and devotion of the Court and the people of Madrid.

== Features ==
=== General information ===
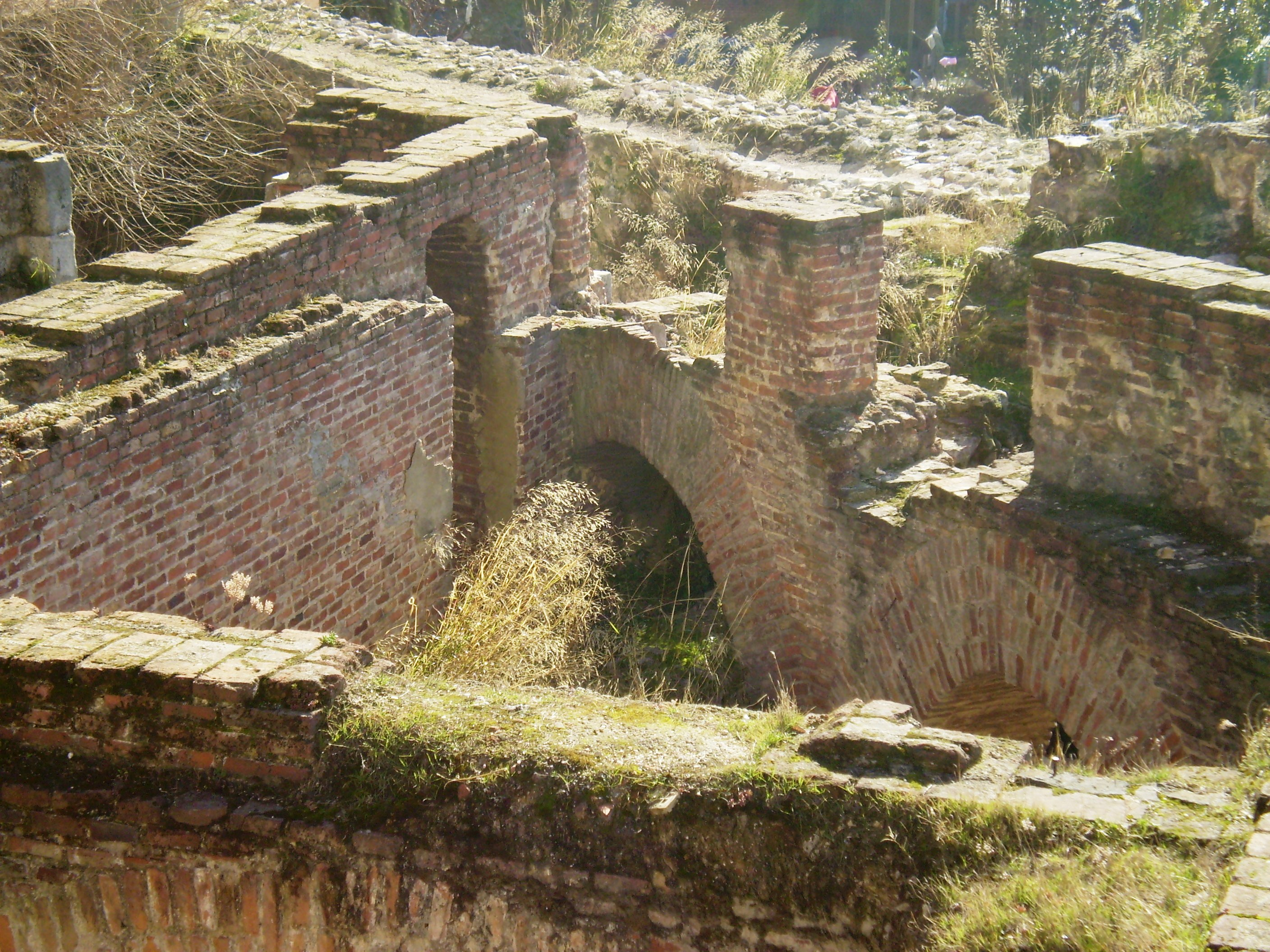
Another view of the remains in the park of Mohamed I

The Muslim Walls of Madrid protected a fortified complex, in which there were three preeminent buildings: the alcázar, the mosque and the house of the emir or governor.

The Walls started directly from the alcázar, from its southern part, with the other three sides of the building uncovered, because the rough terrain did not require a greater fortification there. To the west, the cliffs located on the plain of Manzanares river constituted a natural defense of the alcázar; a similar function was served by the ravines and gorges of the brook del Arenal, to the north and to the east.

Their total length was about 980 meters (3,220 ft), enclosing an area of about 4 hectares (9.9 acres). They had an outside moat only in their eastern section, where the ground had an elevation even higher than that of the Walls.

Around the Walls there were several independent watchtowers, but we only have a historical record of the Tower of the Bones, named for its proximity to a cemetery. This was built in the 11th century, before the conquest of Madrid by the king Alfonso VI of León and Castile, and integrated into the Christian Walls as Albarrana tower.

Outside the Walls, there were different public lands dedicated to leisure and equestrian games (almusara), plus a Muslim neighborhood or medina, and a Christian suburb or mozarabs.

=== Gates ===
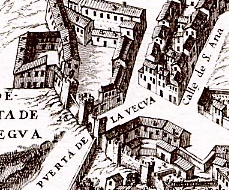
Detail of the gate Puerta de la Vega, in the plan of Pedro Teixeira, of 1656

The Walls have three gates, of direct access and without any bend:

- The Puerta de la Vega, located in the current Cuesta de la Vega, connected the military compound with the plains of the Manzanares river and the roads of Castile and Extremadura. It might have been located on the site now occupied by the foreign niche of the Virgin of la Almudena, next to the crypt of the eponymous cathedral;
- The Puerta de la Mezquita or Arco de Santa María led to the civil core developed outside the fortress, through the current Calle Mayor;
- The Puerta de la Sagra, or de la Xagra, or del Campo ended up in the gardens, by the current Calle de Bailén, in semicorner with Plaza de Oriente.

From an archaeological perspective, the Puerta de la Vega offers the most data; thus existing references use data extrapolated from the excavations. The foundations of one of the buckets that originally flanked this gate have been documented. The dimensions of the access, according to data from the excavations, would have been 4.5 and 3.5 meters (15 and 11 ft). Typologically it is a narrow gate, between two towers and a poorly developed. After the archaeological activities only the foundation has been preserved, but this is outside of its original position.

=== Towers ===
The wall was organized in different towers, quadrangular, of between 3.3 and 2.4 meters wide (10.8 and 7.9 ft) according to the tower- and with paw at the base, with an arrangement slightly protruding from the main wall. They were spaced approximately every 20 meters (66 ft). These stretches combined stonework of flint and limestone.

Despite the measures, currently these are just highlights with respect to the wall in which they are framed. The section that must necessarily serve as a guide because of being the best preserved, that of Park Mohamed I, has about twenty m (66 ft) between each tower. There are a total of six, although one tower was lost, but is indicated by its base. The towers serve to confirm, once again, that this constitutes an enclosure of an Islamic court. The shape of the towers supports such a conclusion, as usually the Christians used a semicircular shape, clearly unlike those seen in the Park Mohamed I.

== Visible fragments ==
=== Park of Mohamed I ===
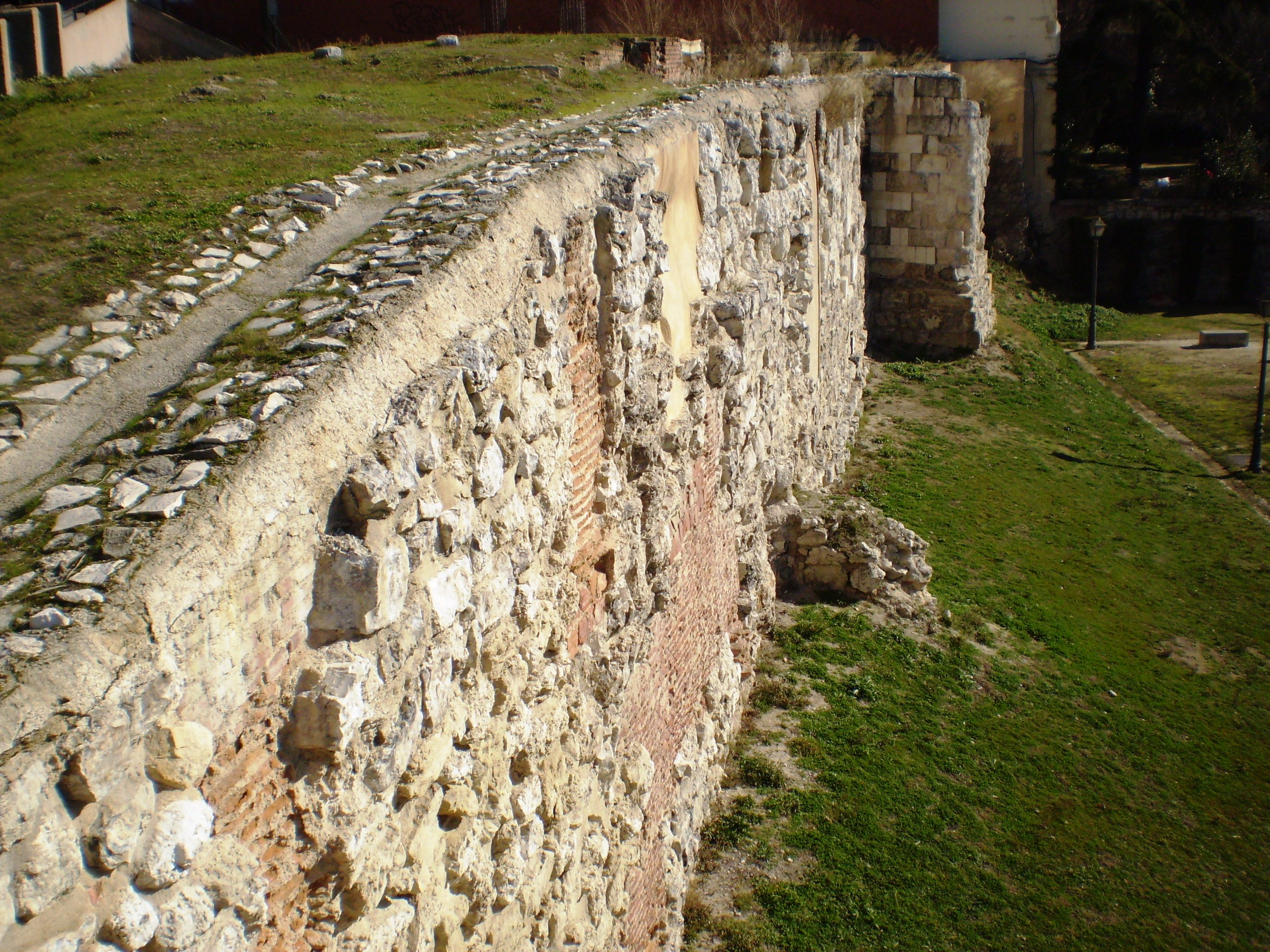
Remains of the Muslim Walls of Madrid, in the Cuesta de la Vega, integrated within the Park of Mohamed I.

This is the most important fragment, both in its state of preservation and in its accessibility to visitors. The excavations carried out there in 1972-1975 and 1985 onwards have been aided by the demolition of a 19th-century building that sat on the stretch itself, revealing a lot of data. This happened two years after 1985, and also represented a restoration and enhancement of the section of the wall.

It has in view approximately 120 meters length (390 ft). This part of the Walls has been preserved by being used as a load-bearing wall in buildings of modern times, and surfaced after their demolition. However, the fact that it has been used as a foundation should not be overlooked, because all the Walls might have also had such a fate. Apparently, many sections of the Walls were rebuilt and remodeled as well, and others may have suffered worse in the course of history.

It is a stretch of a width around 2.6 meters (8 ft 6 in), which is quite consistent if put in relation to the size of the towers that are around it. There are two exterior walls that have inside masonry to mode of core. The masonry is linked with lime mortar. It is of note that all materials that make the stretch could be found relatively close to the city areas, which reaffirms once again the geostrategic role of the rise in which emerged the Islamic city.

Deepening in the two facing walls, its bottoms are formed by large blocks of flint, cut only on its outer face and slightly trimmed, but not modeling, inside. From there rise ashlars of limestone, providing a new finding that the track is of al-Andalusian origin, because the materials follow the style of Cordoban rigging, which is a constant in the centuries in which life unfolds in Madrid. The Córdoban rigging is an ashlar to rope – the longest part of it abroad – and two or three blight, the short side visible. This is difficult to appreciate along the stretch, because the passage of time. In fact, it is possible that the Walls was remodeled in the 10th century after a siege of Ramiro II of León, but never possible that was rebuilt.

Finding on foot of wall the Córdoban rigging may be difficult, because when it put in value in the late 1980s was applied a render in white, if it was on track to hide some patches implanted in the wall during its time as load-bearing wall also hid some details. On the other hand, the small arch that can be seen capping could be a sort of drain without interest, which follows the documentation of modern times, which marks the passage of a small stream by that area. To try to provide a more historical perspective was recreated a small slope to try to rebuild the period atmosphere, as transformed by the growth of Madrid.

=== Calle Bailén 12 ===
The calle Bailén n.º 12 is a building founded on remnants of the Walls. This was built in 1970s, and though by then it already was an Artistic Historical Monument, two sections of the Walls and a tower were destroyed -one to make site to the building, and other to give way to its tenants-.

The building, however, retains some vestiges of the stretch in a very bad state, because at present are part of their private garage. These are remains very similar to those of Park of Muhamed I, because it is an extension of the same.

The incomprehensible destruction was accompanied by some documentation work, and today is known to have a width of 2.5 meters -a little narrower than the portion that has already been seen- and offered a possibility that can not usually be: the dissection of the wall. The data regarding the core of lime mortar masonry are given by this construction.

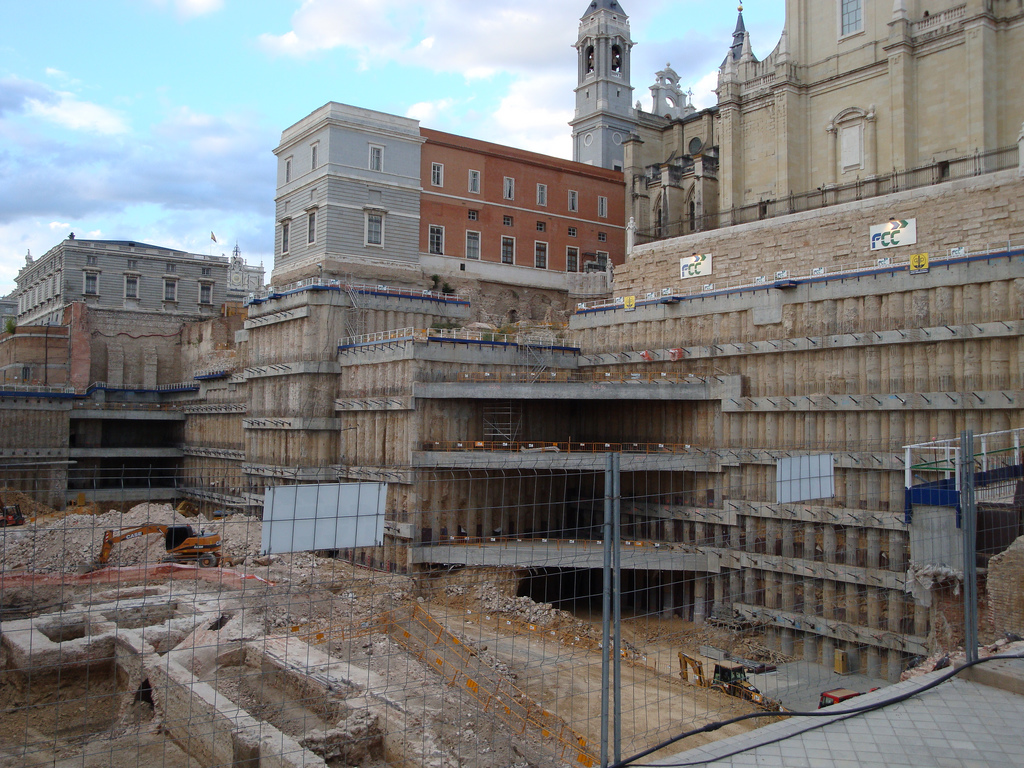
Construction of Royal Collections Museum (2008), where remains of the Muslim Wall were found

=== Future Museum of Royal Collections ===
There is another large section of the Arab walls found in the late-1990s, directly opposite the Almudena Cathedral. These remains have surfaced as part of the works of the future Royal Collections Museum. As an area in which it is impossible to make any kind of archaeological tasting, the specialist Alain Kermovan traced the route through radioelectric detectors, without lifting the pavement.

Are two stretches from the Islamic period, which between them account for about 70 meters. The materials used are the same, and construction techniques, but not the thickness: this exceeds, on average, the 3.2 meters, being slightly wider than previously seen. Here it has been able to verify the height, ranging around 7 meters, although this is found only in a section, because the other is destroyed completely.

== Archaeological excavations ==
Until 1985, the archaeological excavations in the city of Madrid only had by protagonists visible elements such as fortified enclosures or churches. That, for the study of the Muslim Walls, is that since the first excavations of the late 18th century and the beginning of 19th century have been carrying out archaeological works.

In the 20th century, there are some advances over the wall. The Instituto Arqueológico de Madrid, in the sixties and seventies, performs some tasks aimed at protecting the first and second enclosure, since both had been declared "monuments" in the fifties. Thus, were carried out archaeological campaigns in some areas as the Cuesta de la Vega -between 1972 and 1975- or the Calle Mayor.

The lack of visible remains playing against the excavations in finding activities related to the Muslim walled. Since 1985 it has been excavated on the Cuesta de la Vega, placing on value the most important section of this enclosure setting the park called Muhamed I, in honor of the founder of the city.

== See also ==
- Walls of Madrid
