= Christian Walls of Madrid =

Medieval walls of Madrid, Spain

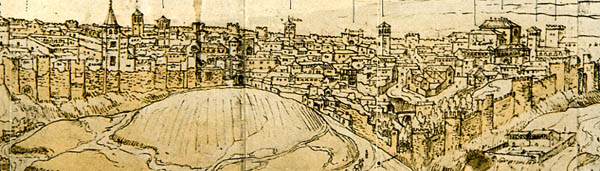
Detail drawing by Anton van den Wyngaerde in 1562 showing the Christian Walls of Madrid since its start in the Muslim Walls near of the gate Puerta de la Vega (left) to the gate Puerta de Moros, in the current Plaza del Humilladero (right).

The Christian Walls of Madrid, also known as the Medieval Walls, were built in Madrid, Spain, between the 11th and 12th centuries, once the city passed to the Crown of Castile. They were built as an extension of the original 9th-century Muslim Walls of Madrid to accommodate the new districts which emerged after the Reconquista (11th–13th centuries).

When Philip II moved his court to Madrid from Valladolid in 1561, the walls fell into disuse and were almost entirely demolished. Some of the remains are still standing, however, and are integrated into the structure of various buildings in El Madrid de los Austrias, a name designating the Habsburgs' historic center of the city.

The most important sections of the wall are in the calles (streets) of los Mancebos, Don Pedro, del Almendro, Escalinata, del Espejo, de Mesón de Paños, and Cava Baja; in Plaza de Isabel II; and in the underground parking garage of the Plaza de Oriente. The remains that are still standing were declared a Historical and Artistic Monument in 1954.

== History ==
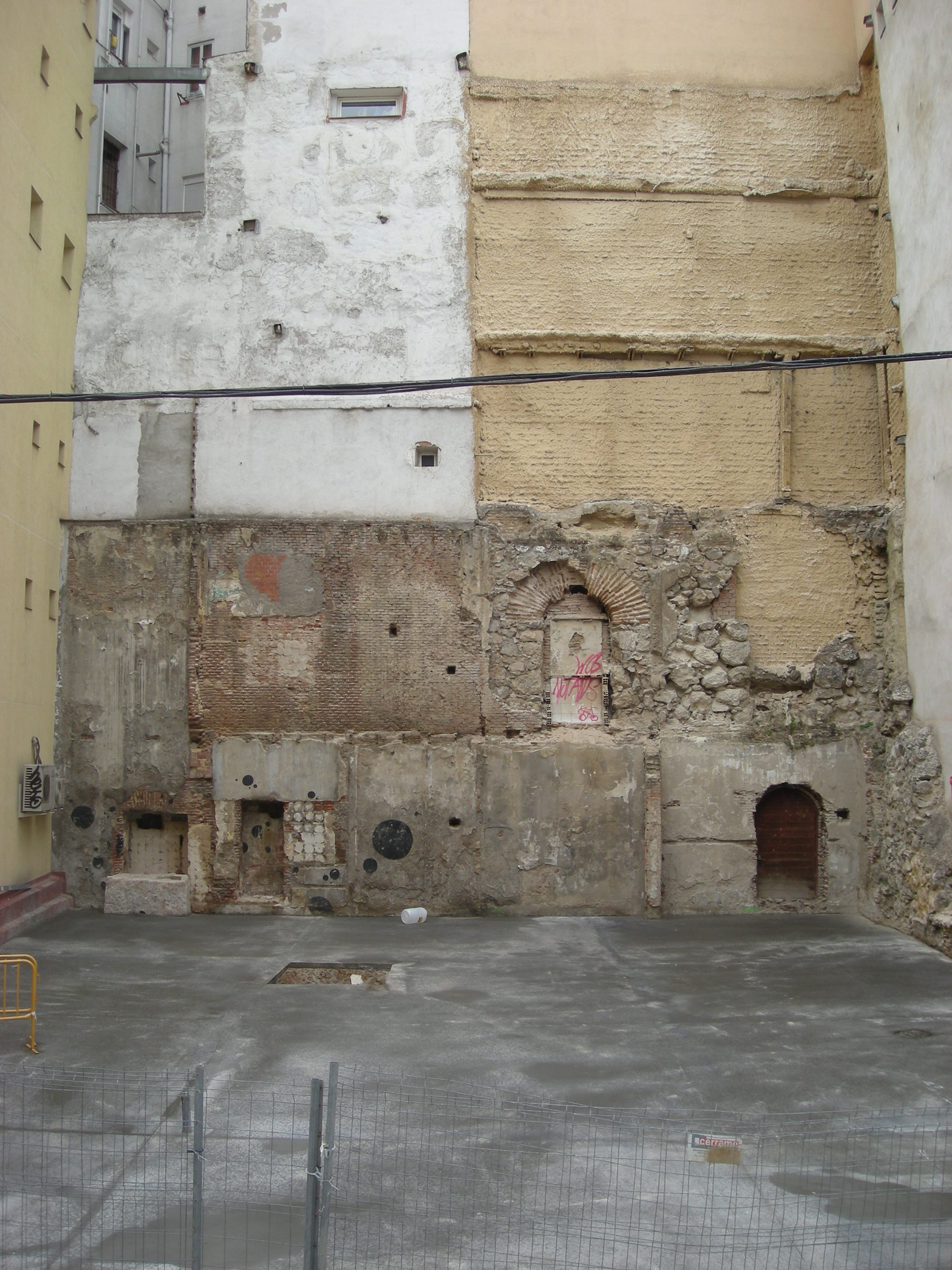
Material of the walls in the Calle Escalinata near the Plaza de Isabel II

Tradition attributes the construction of the walls to King Alfonso VII of León and Castile (1126–1157), although it is likely that work began before his reign, in the years immediately following the Christian conquest of Madrid (1083). This would date the construction of the walls to the reign of Alfonso VI of León and Castile (1040–1109).

At the beginning of the 13th century, the walls were not yet completed. As stated in the Fuero de Madrid of 1202: "all the caloñas of the Council invest in the works of the Walls until finished". Various municipal documents suggest that they could have been completed in the second decade of the 13th century.

After the Reconquista, in the 14th and 15th centuries, the defensive role the walls played in the Christian reclamation of land and the process of Christian repopulation began to fade.

The remarkable urban growth experienced by Madrid and the development of new suburbs beyond the city walls led to their demolition, particularly after the 16th century, when the city has designated the capital of Spain.

== Features ==
The Christian Walls of Madrid protected an area of just over 33 hectares (82 acres), with a total length of 2,200 meters. This area was eight times larger than the space within the preceding Muslim Walls, which was about 4 ha (9.9 acres).

Unlike the Arab walled enclosure, which was built in quadrangular towers, the Christian structure was articulated from semicircular keep towers on layers of flint. The properties of flint (which, when struck, causes sparks) gave rise to one of the historic city slogans: "I was on water built, my walls are of fire."

It is estimated that there could have been between 130 and 140 towers, one every 10 or 15 meters (33 or 49 ft). The walls were surrounded by an outer moat, which ran along most of the perimeter. This is preserved in the names of some Madrilenian routes, namely the calles of Cava Alta, Cava Baja, and Cava de San Miguel. These calles were built over this pit (cava) after it was covered.

The Christian Walls contained four gates, each protected by the proximity of one or more strong towers. These gates, none of which were preserved, were:

- The Puerta de Guadalajara was the main gate of the city and the most ornate, given its location in a place of great commercial transit. It was located at the current number 49, Calle Mayor. It consisted of two large towers, across which stretched the entrance arch. In 1535, the emperor Carlos V, Holy Roman Emperor (1500–1558) directed the demolition of the original medieval gate and replaced it with a new one, which consisted of three arches and greater ornamentation. This gate was destroyed in a fire on September 2, 1582.
- The Valnadú Gate (alternatively spelled Balnadú) was possibly located at the intersection of calles Lepanto, Carlos III, and Vergara, near the Teatro Real.
- The Puerta de Moros (the Moorish Gate) was located south of the present Plaza del Humilladero, between the calles of Almendro and Cava Baja. It was destroyed in 1412 during an uprising.
- The Puerta Cerrada (closed gate), located in the Plaza de Puerta Cerrada, was initially called Puerta de la Culebra, due to its carved relief of a dragon. The name changed to Cerrada (closed) when it was shut as a result of the frequent crimes and assaults that took place inside. It was flanked by the Tower del Vinagre and was demolished in 1569, on the occasion of the entry into the city of Elisabeth of Valois, wife of Philip II.

In addition to the gates of the Christian Walls, three gates of the Muslim Walls remained: the Arc de Santa María, the Puerta de la Vega, and the Puerta de la Sagra.

Several albarrana towers and watchtowers were built at strategic locations along the walls. These included the Tower de Alzapierna (or de Gaona), which had a mandate to monitor the source of the Caños del Peral fountain (in the current Plaza de Isabel II). The Tower de los Huesos, built in the 11th century during the Muslim occupation of the city, was incorporated into the Christian Walls to protect the Valnadú Gate. The remains of the latter are exhibited in the underground parking lot at the Plaza de Oriente.

=== Most relevant remains ===
The most important remains of the Christian Walls of Madrid are integrated into various buildings and urban infrastructures. In most cases, access is very limited, given the private nature of the apartment blocks where these remains are located:

- Cava Baja – at number 30 on Cava Baja, a fragment of the Christian Walls approximately 20 meters (66 ft) long and 11 meters (36 ft) high remains intact in the courtyard of a farm. At numbers 22 and 24 of the same street, a section of foundation and the base of a semicircular keep tower remain. Additionally, at number 10, there is a stretch of wall that is 7 m in length (23 ft) and has a height between 1 and 4 m (3 ft 3 in and 13 ft 1 in). This section stands beside the ruins of a semi-cylindrical keep tower.
- Calle del Almendro – a section standing at 16 meters (52 ft) long and 11 meters (36 ft) wide is preserved at number 17 on this street. It is visible from the street through a barred door.
- Plaza de Puerta Cerrada – the most complete surviving fragment of the wall stands at numbers 4 and 6 of this plaza. The height of this section remains entirely intact. Due to its preservation, the round path and the parapet are visible, as well as the remains of a tower.
- Plaza de Isabel II – at number 3 of this plaza, a stretch of the wall can be seen in the basement of an American restaurant. This section is displayed to the public during the business hours of the establishment. Discovered in 1991, it includes the flint masonry and two brick arches, probably corresponding to a late-medieval renovation of the wall. In 1990, the base of the Tower de Alzapierna was excavated in the current metro station at the plaza, but these remains were later destroyed.
- Calle de la Escalinata – between 1943 and 1945, different remains of a tower and a stretch of the walls were discovered at numbers 9 and 11 of this street, near the Plaza de Isabel II.
- Calle del Mesón de Paños – at numbers 11, 13, and 15, various poorly preserved remains were discovered in 1956.
- Calle de los Mancebos – at numbers 3 and 5 are the remains of a silo with Islamic artifacts. Although this silo forms part of a larger building structure, it can be seen from the street.
- Calle del Espejo – at number 14 a flint wall of 2.5 m high (8.2 ft) is located inside a garage, accessible from the Calle de la Escalinata. At number 10, there are also the remains of a semicircular keep tower and part of the wall.
- Plaza de Oriente – the foundation of the Torre de los Huesos is located here. The tower is of Muslim origin and was later integrated into the Christian Walls. It is exhibited in the underground parking lot at this plaza, which was built in 1996.

== Gallery ==
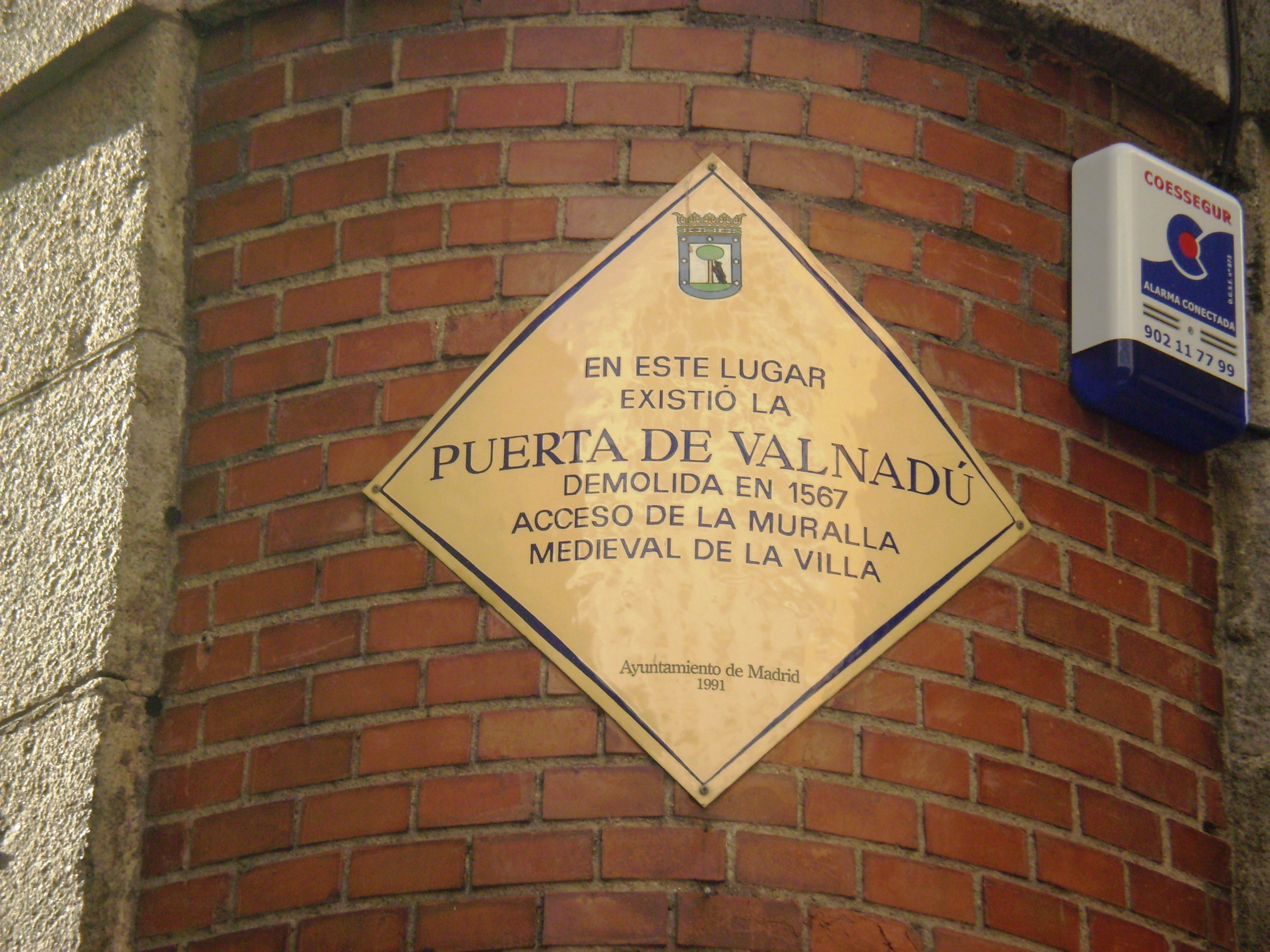
Placard at the intersection of Calle de la Unión and Calle de Vergara that commemorates the nearby Valnadú Gate.

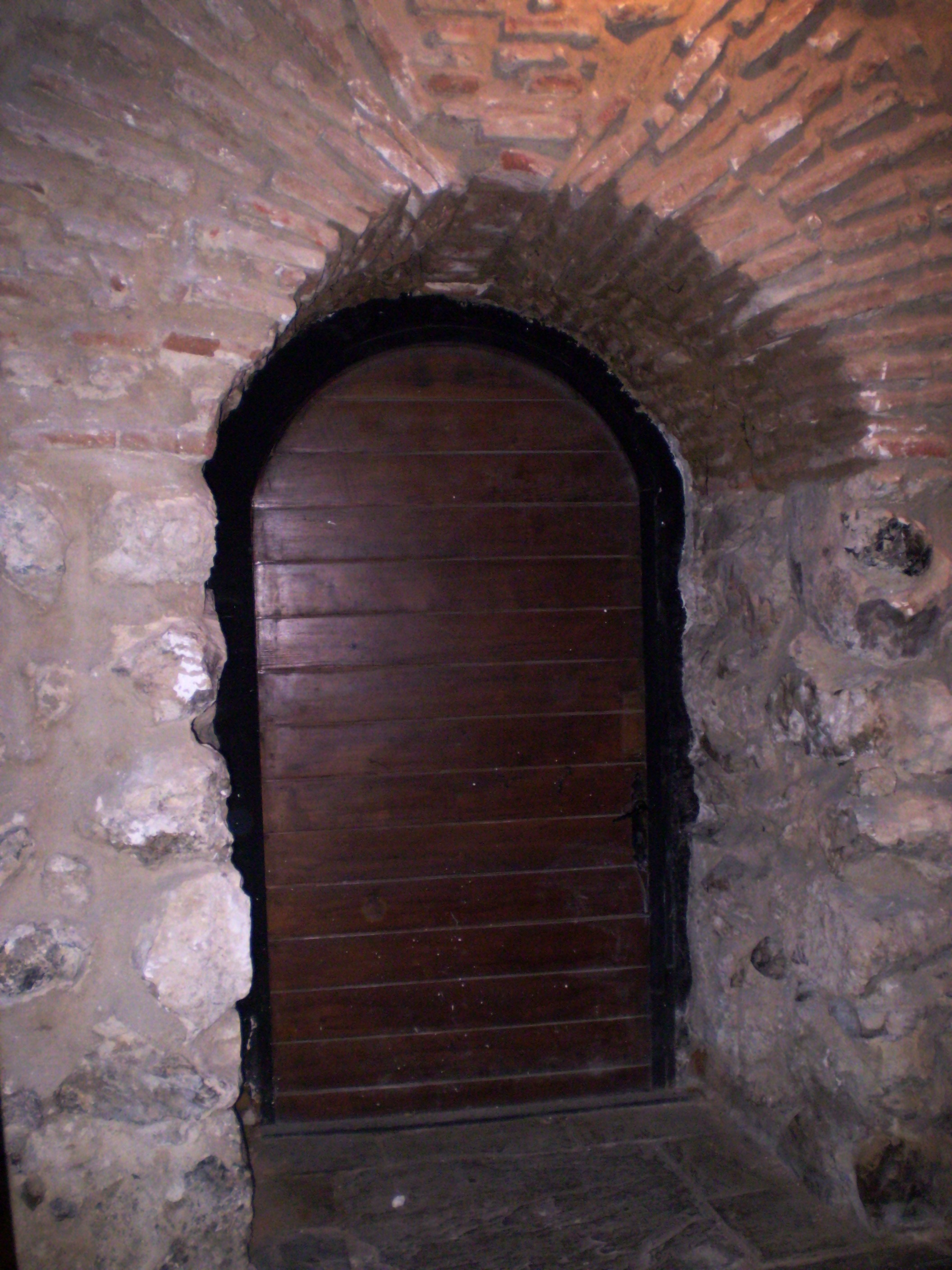
Late-medieval archway of Christian Walls in a restaurant basement at number 3 of Plaza de Isabel II

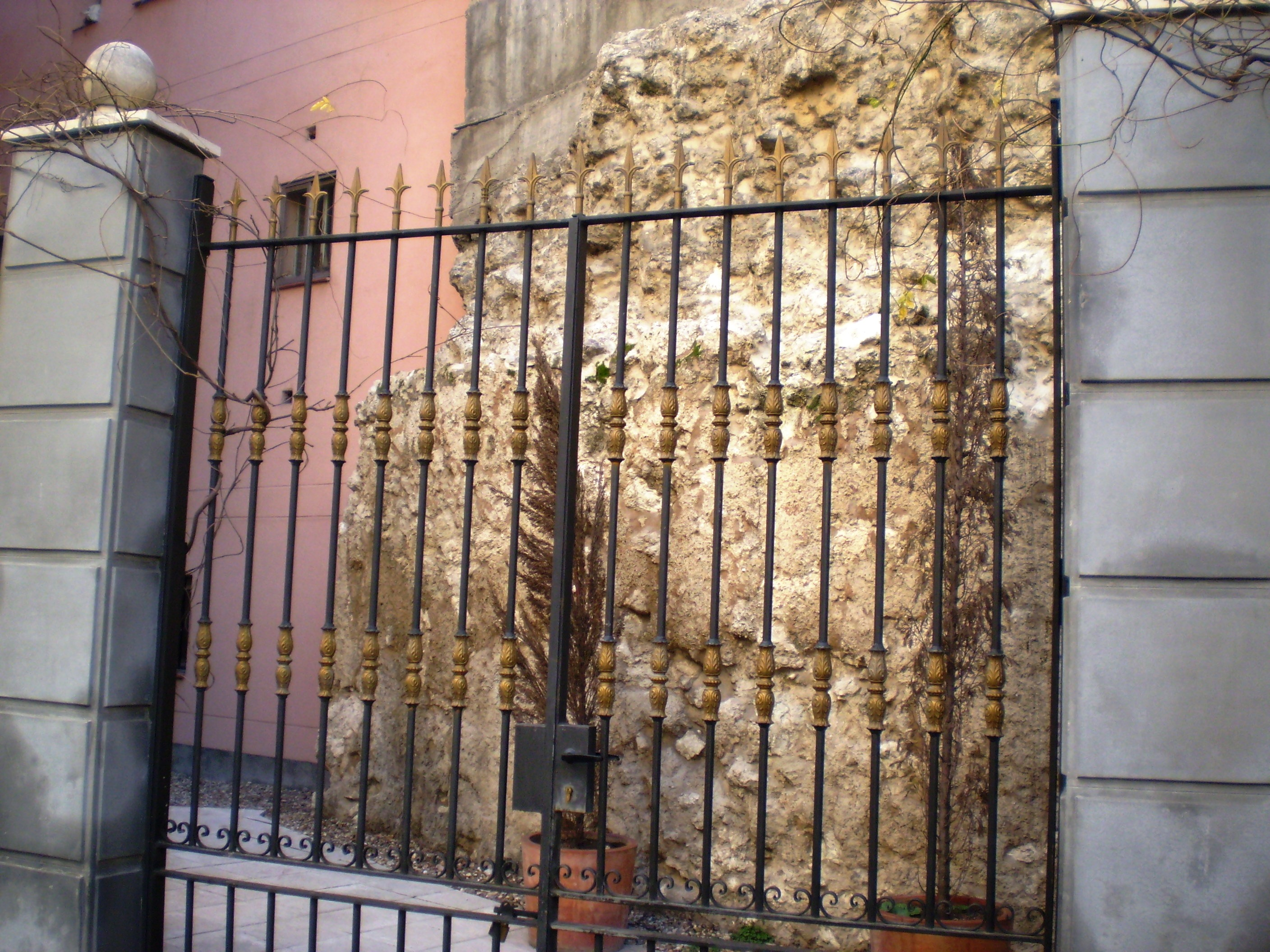
Remains of the Christian Walls on Calle de los Mancebos

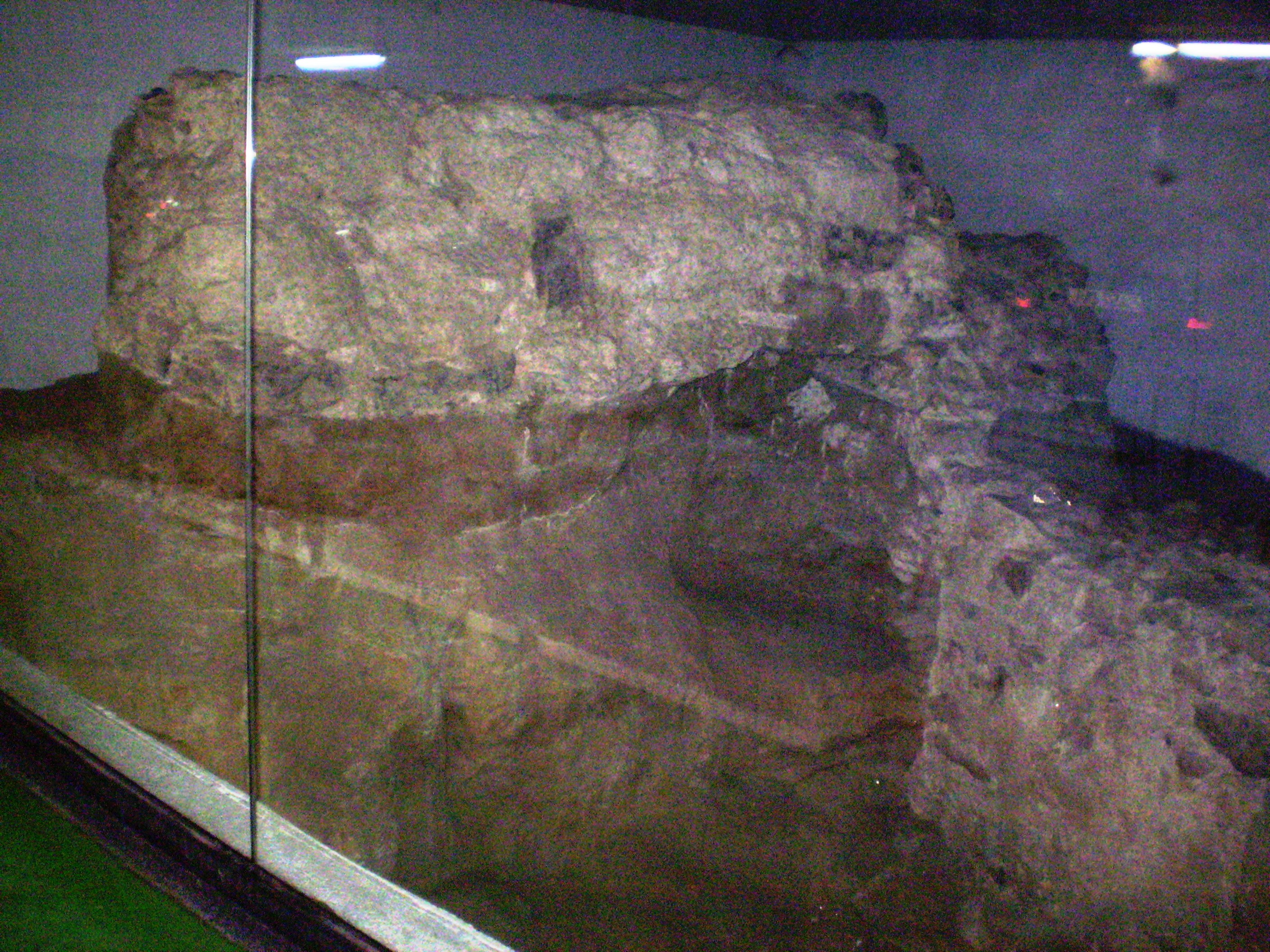
Foundations of the Torre de los Huesos in the underground parking of the Plaza de Oriente. Built of limestone and flint in the 11th century by the Muslim population and subsequently integrated into the Christian Walls.

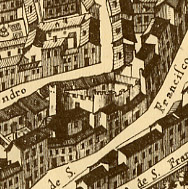
In the plan of Madrid of Pedro Teixeira (1656) some remains of the Christian Walls were noted, such as this fortification located between Calle Almendro and Calle Cava Baja.

== See also ==
- Walls of Madrid
