= Tower of the Bones =

- Plaza de Oriente, Madrid
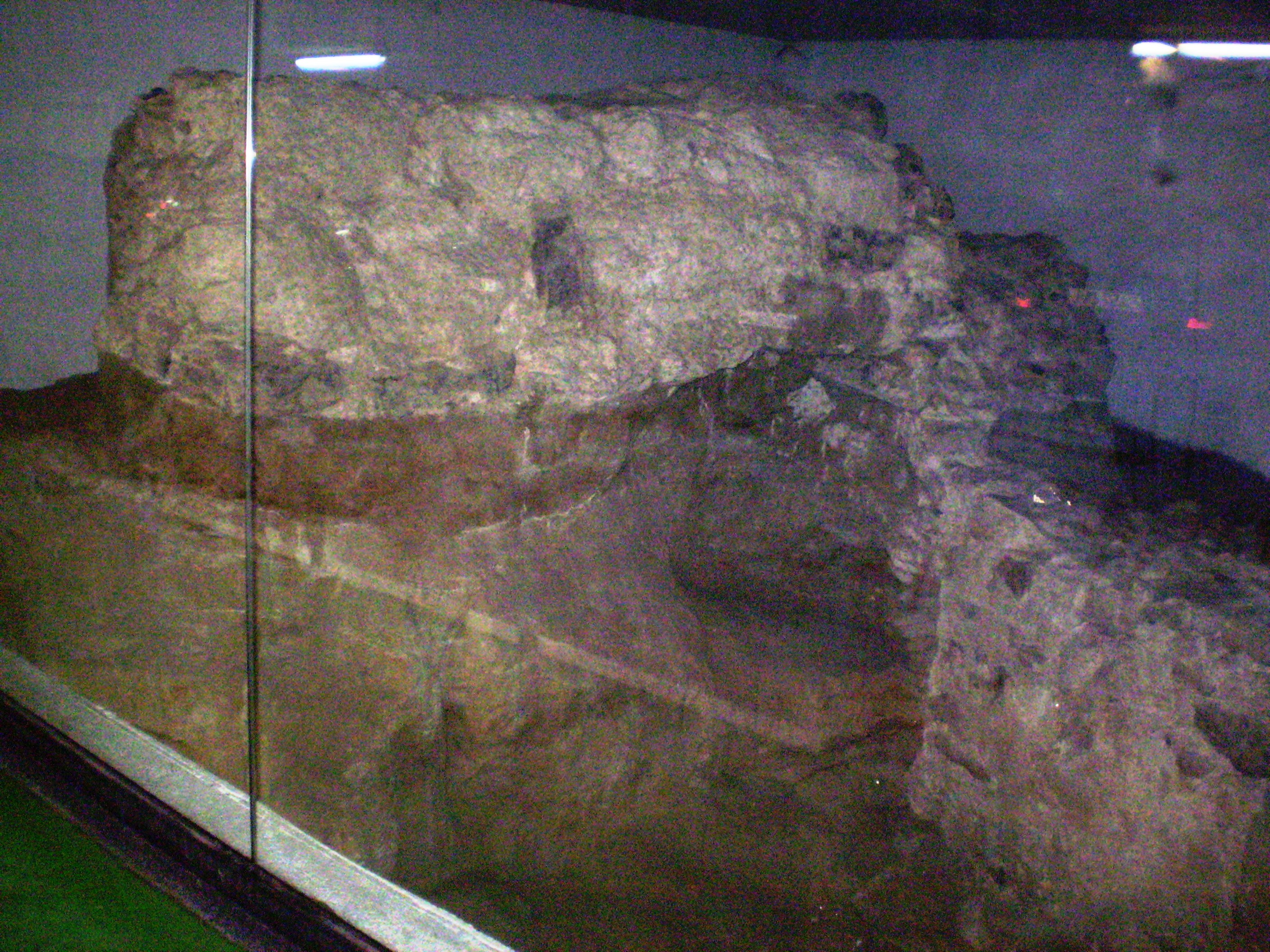

Location
- Coordinates: 40°24′59″N 3°42′55″W

Site history
- Built: 11th century

The Tower of Bones is an Islamic watchtower, the remains of which are exhibited in the underground parking structure in the Plaza de Oriente, in the Spanish city of Madrid. It was built in the 11th century by the Muslim population that founded the Mayrit fortress two centuries earlier, as an integral part of its defensive system.

== Background ==
The tower was located outside the citadel and served to keep watch in the Arenal stream area, in the northwest of the capital, next to the place currently occupied by the Royal Palace.

With the conquest of Madrid by Alfonso VI in 1083, the tower was incorporated as an albarrana tower into the Christian wall, which the Madrilenos built as an extension of the Muslim walls.

In addition to protecting the Fountain of the Pear Tree Canals, which was located in what is now Plaza de Isabel II, it guaranteed the security of the Valnadú Gate, one of the four entrances to the Christian wall. This was near the confluence of Calle de la Unión and Calle Vergara, next to the southern façade of the Royal Theatre.

The tower, which takes its name from its proximity to the old Islamic cemetery of "Huesa del Raf," and it floorplan is in a square. It combines masonry and ashlars, made of flint and limestone.

In 1996, it was discovered with the remodeling of the Plaza de Oriente, during the construction of an underground parking lot. Only its base is partially preserved.

== See also ==
- Muslim Walls of Madrid
- Christian Walls of Madrid
- Tower of Narigües
