= Tower of Narigües =

- Torre de Narigües
- Part of the Muslim Walls of Madrid
- Calle Mayor, nº 83, Madrid in Spain
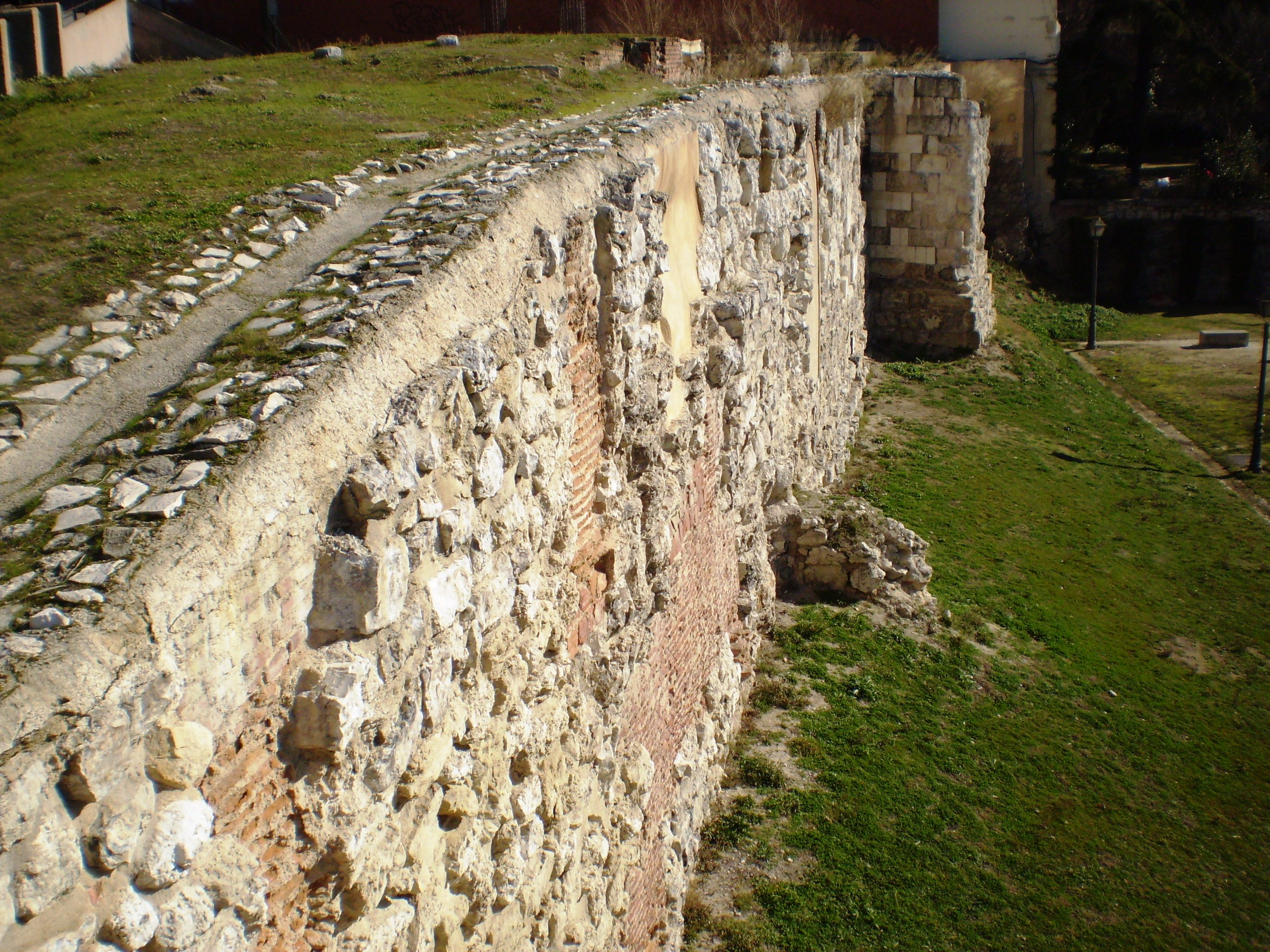
- Torre de Narigües en la muralla de Madrid

Site information
- Type: Tower

Location
- Coordinates: 40.414839°N 3.714489°W

The Tower of Narigües (Spanish: torre Narigües del Pozacho) was an albarrana tower in Madrid. Its remains are along the old Muslim wall of Madrid. Located at 83 Calle Mayor, next to the Segovia Viaduct that crosses Calle de Segovia. It was separated from the wall itself, but joined to it through another wall. It served as a watch tower.

== Background ==
The tower was one among many along the Muslim Walls of Madrid, each a distance of approximately 20 meters (66 ft) between them. It stood until the 19th century. Author Mesonero Romanos, described it in the 18th century as located near the Malpica Palace, the Madrid residence of the Marquis of Malpica, on the waters and sources of the Pozacho.

== See also ==
- Tower of the Bones
- Muslim Walls of Madrid
