= Torre de la Malmuerta =

Coordinates: 37°53′30″N 4°46′40″W

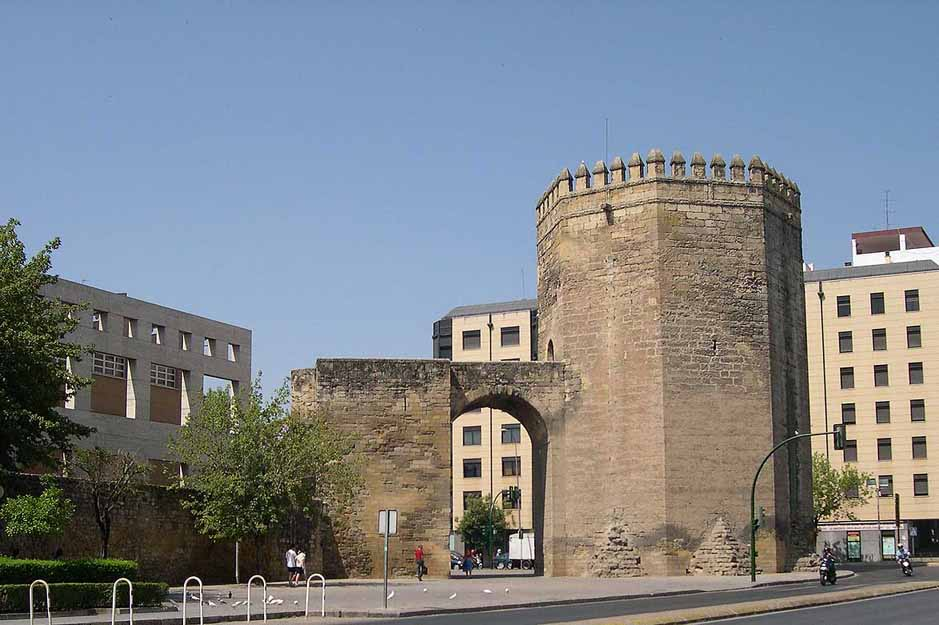
Torre de la Malmuerta

The Torre de la Malmuerta is a gate tower of the Axerquía wall in Córdoba, Spain.

This albarrana tower was built between 1406–1408 by order of King Henry III of Castile, over a pre-existing Almohad structure, to defend the gates of Rincón and Colodro. Later it was also used as a prison for nobles. The tower has an octagonal plan and has an annexed arch attached to it.

The tower's name, meaning "Tower of the Wrongly Dead Woman" in English, refers to a woman who, according to legend, was killed there by her husband after a false accusation of adultery.

== See also ==
- Calahorra Tower
