= Axerquía =

Historic eastern suburb in Spain

Coordinates: 37.8865°N 4.7718°W

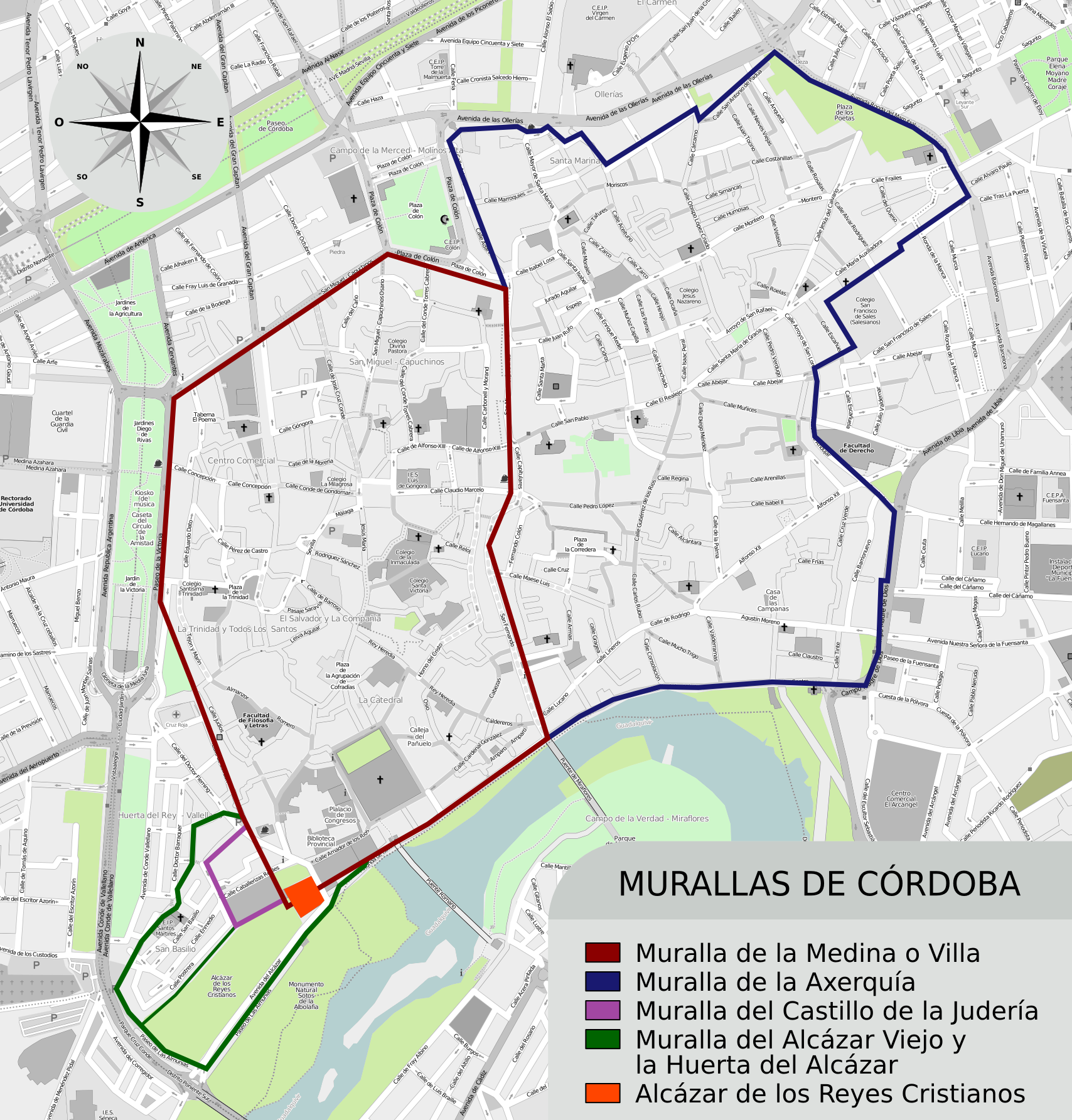
Red line indicates the Medina/Villa wall. Blue line indicates the Axerquía wall.

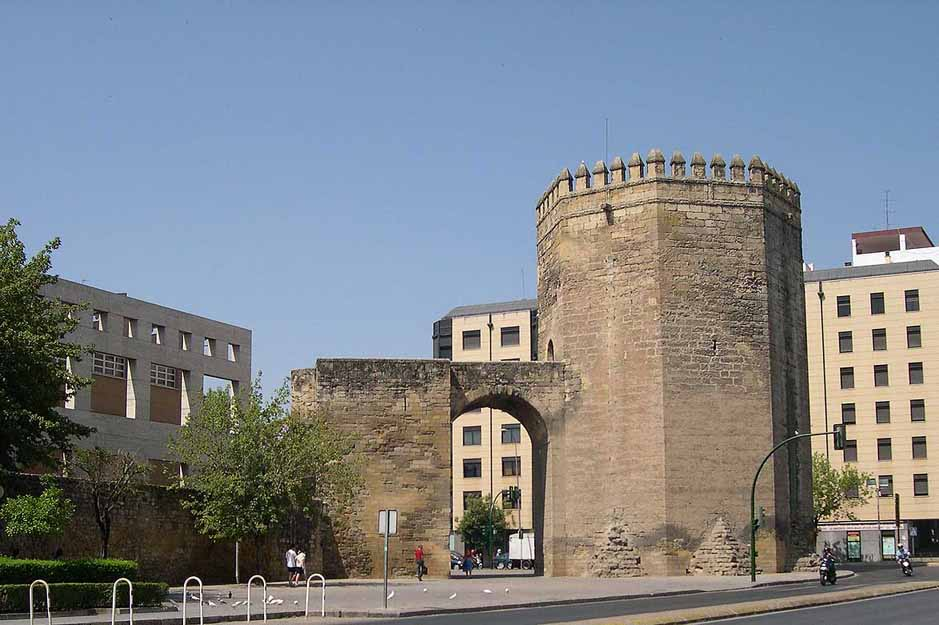
Torre de la Malmuerta, a gate tower of the Axerquía wall

Axerquía was the historic eastern suburb of the Historic centre of Córdoba (known at the time to the Arabs as Medina and the Christians as Villa). The Axerquía areas was also walled. Currently, Axerquía is an area within the city of Córdoba in Spain.

Courtyard houses of Axerquía was listed as one of 25 sites of the 2020 World Monuments Watch published by World Monuments Fund (WMF).
