= Monument to Philip IV of Spain =

Memorial in Madrid, Spain

Coordinates: 40.41833°N 3.71220°W

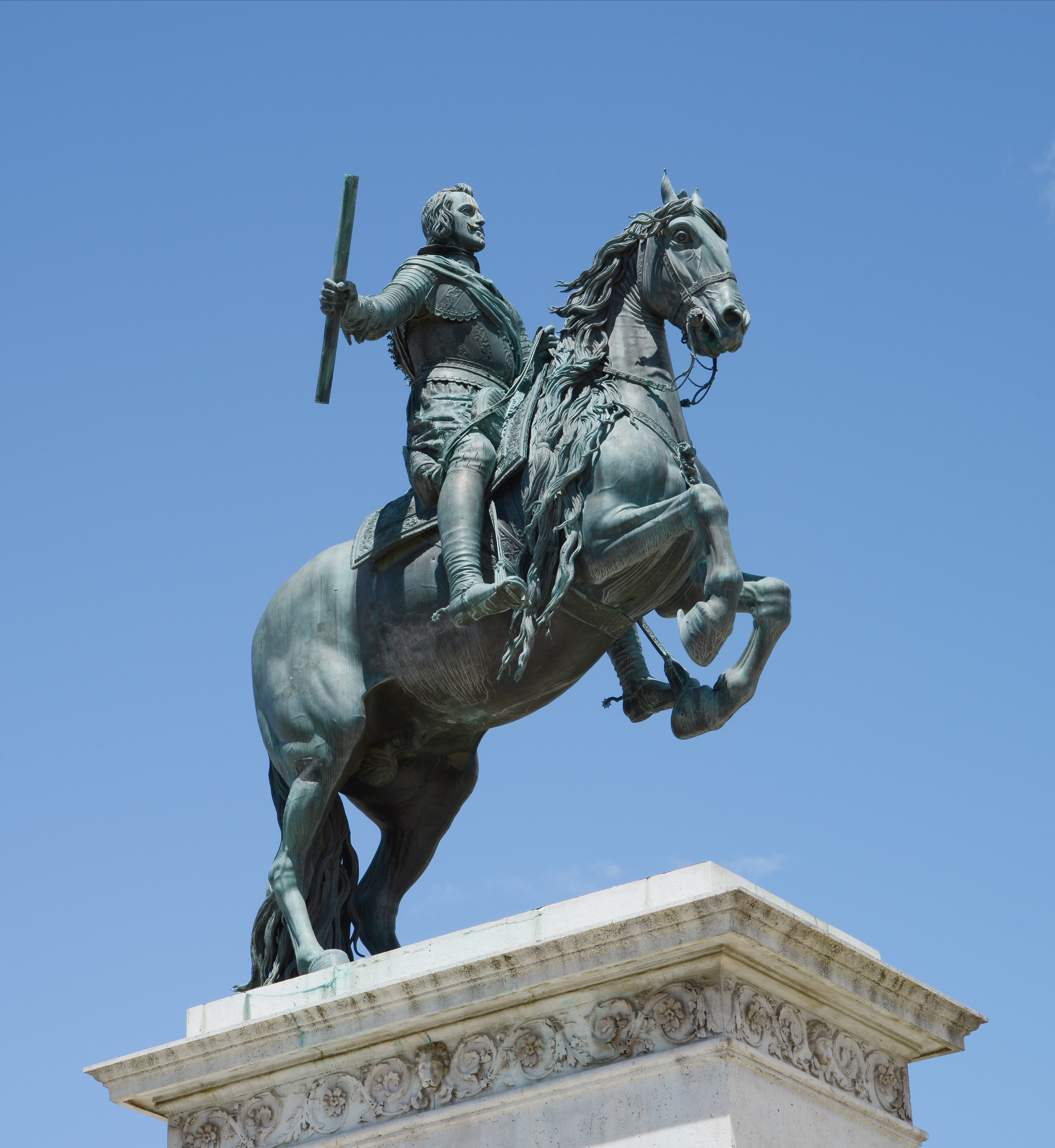
Equestrian statue of Philip IV

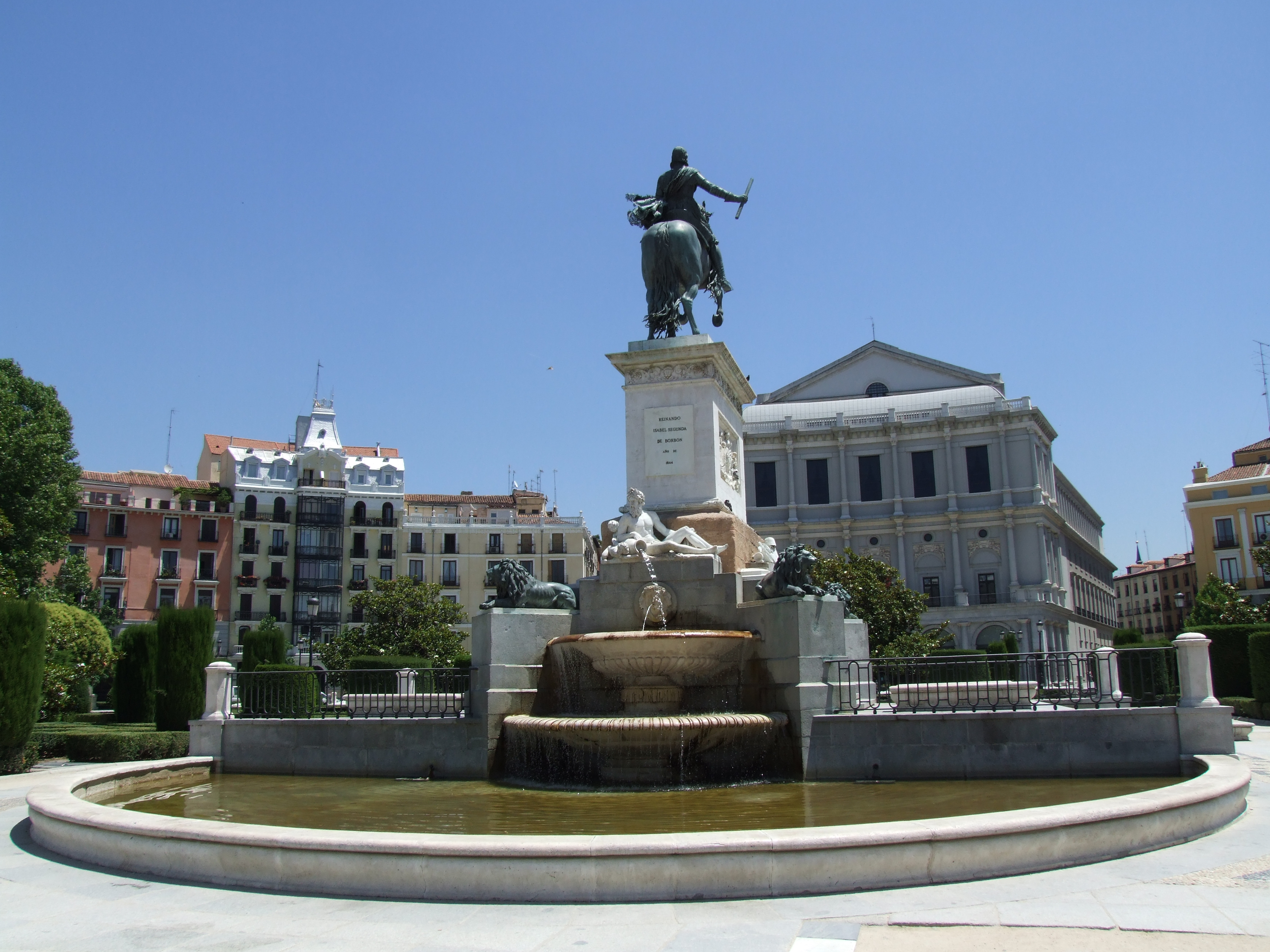
West side

The Monument to Philip IV or Fountain of Philip IV is a memorial to Philip IV of Spain in the centre of Plaza de Oriente in Madrid, Spain. It was raised at the insistence of Isabella II of Spain in the first half of the 19th century, opening on 17 November 1843, a year before Narciso Pascual y Colomer came up with the square's final layout. However, its equestrian statue of the king dates to the 17th century and was produced by the Italian sculptor Pietro Tacca. It was begun in 1634 and shipped to Madrid in 1640, the year of his death. The sculpture, atop a complicated fountain composition, forms the centerpiece of the façade of the Royal Palace. The statue was based in drawings by Diego Velázquez and a bust by Juan Martínez Montañés (who also collaborated on the work).
