= Segovia Viaduct =

Segovia Viaduct Viaducto de Segovia
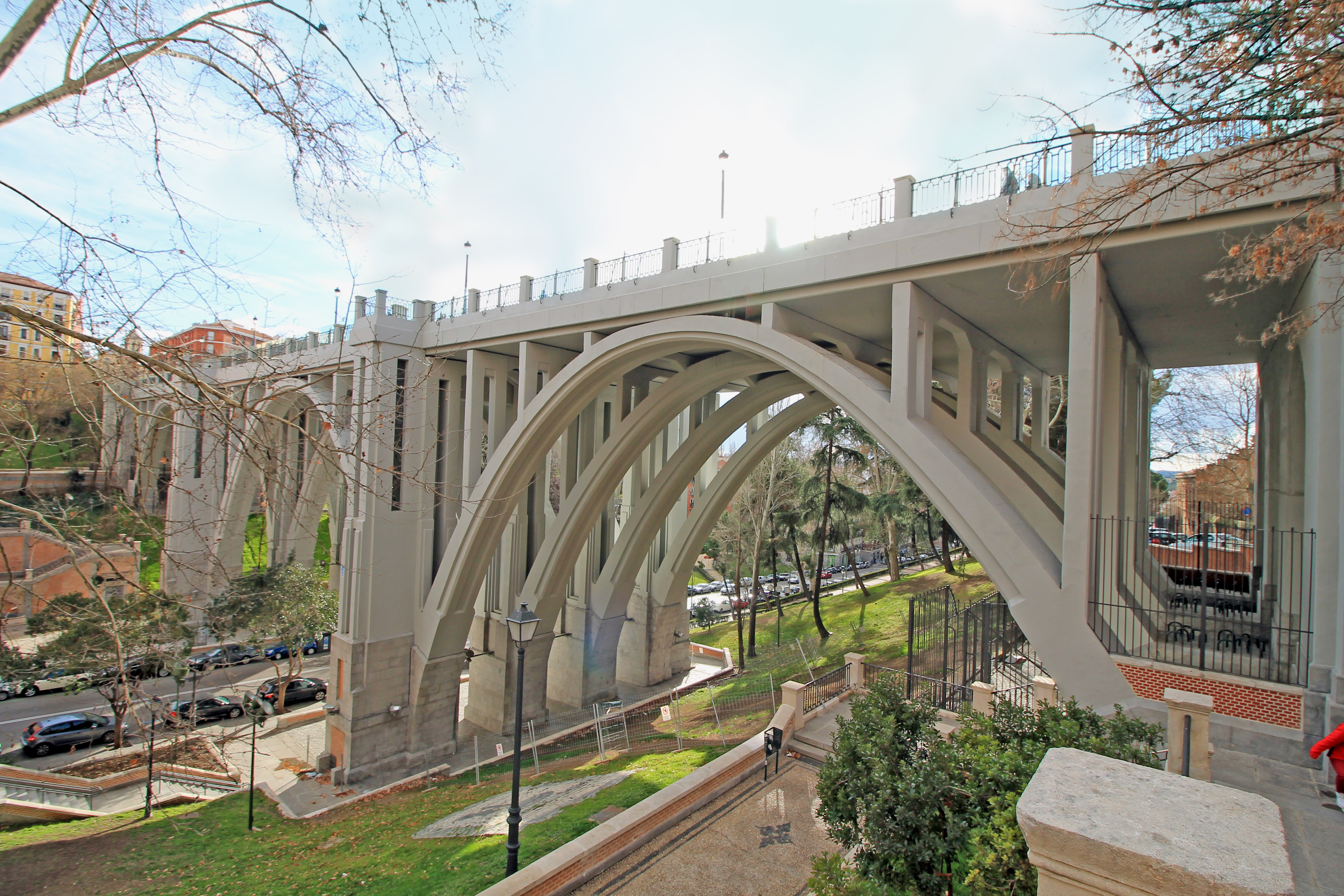
- East side of Segovia Viaduct
- Coordinates: 40.41382°N 3.71366°W
- Carries: Motor vehicles and pedestrians.
- Crosses: Calle de Segovia (street)
- Locale: Madrid, Spain

Characteristics
- Design: Arch bridge
- Material: Reinforced concrete
- Height: 23 m (75 ft)
- Longest span: 35 m (115 ft)
- No. of spans: Three

History
- Architect: Francisco Javier Ferrero
- Engineering design by: José Juan Aracil; Luis Aldaz Muguiro
- Construction start: 1934
- Construction end: 1942
- Rebuilt: 1977–1978

Location
- Interactive map of Segovia Viaduct

The Segovia Viaduct is a viaduct in the La Latina neighborhood in Madrid, Spain. Throughout the centuries the area has been a major crossroad. The bridge's main function has been to facilitate access between the town and the Royal Palace of Madrid. A later version was built in 1934 to replace the previous iron one erected in 1874. The present one is the result of many restorations in order for its structure to accommodate the growing traffic demand. It spans Segovia Street, 25 meters below, from which it takes its name, although it is popularly known as "El Viaducto". Throughout its history, it had been a common site for suicide in Madrid until 1998.

== History ==
Segovia Street lies in the basin at least partially formed by the old San Pedro Creek. In the Middle Ages, this ravine was one of the most important routes of entry into Madrid and connected the town with the old road to Segovia, which started on the other side of the Manzanares River. The Bridge of Segovia (1582-1584) succeeded in crossing the Manzanares, attributed to the architect Juan de Herrera, which replaced the original, built in the first half of the fourteenth century by Alfonso XI of Castile. Abundant in fresh water, the area in the wash of the basin of San Pedro enjoyed many orchards and was called El Pozacho, which was named after a waterwheel or similar hydraulic device which may have existed there. In an illustration by Anton van den Wyngaerde in 1562, the grade of the ravine is clearly seen.

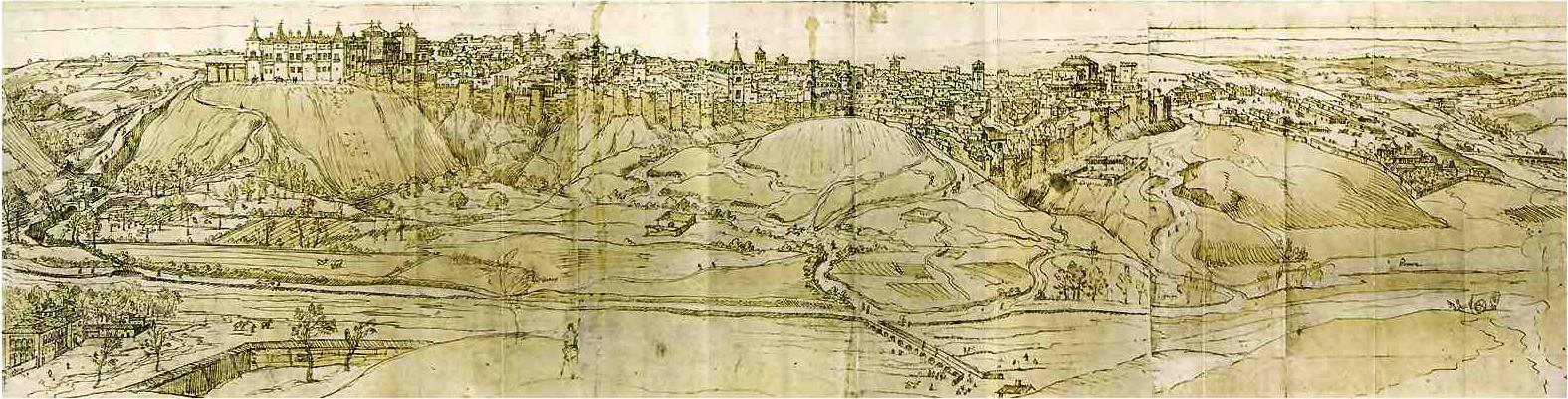
Drawing of Madrid from 1562.

Bailén Street ended abruptly at the edge of this ravine, forcing pedestrians to make the difficult descent and ascent to reach the area of the Royal Alcázar of Madrid. Access to and from what would become Segovia Street was gained by intricate arteries through various paths traversing the slopes.

Upon establishing the Royal Court in Madrid in 1561, King Philip II began to promote urban expansion. This conceptualization required an extension of Bailén Street crossing above and bridging the gap perpendicularly over this ravine, thus joining the Royal Palace area with Vistillas to the south and beyond.

Only a small part of the project to extend Bailén materialized until the Bourbons. Some houses and establishments were demolished, including the original cathedral of Madrid, in order to level the field, creating a gateway to the city. This street was called Calle Real Nueva, and eventually became modern Segovia Street. After two shelved attempts, the viaduct was finally completed in 1874, undergoing two complete reconstructions since then.

== Construction ==
=== The first viaduct ===
The initial concept was started in 1736 by the Italian Juan Bautista Sacchetti, one of the architects who worked on the construction of the Royal Palace. The project ultimately failed to come to fruition. This idea of a viaduct for urban design motivation was proposed again by the royal architect Silvestre Perez during the reign of Joseph Bonaparte (1808-1813). This time, the project also failed to materialize due to lack of monetary resources.

Although the urbanization ideas of Silvestre Perez were not fully implemented, the road which would become Bailén underwent a full remodeling. This involved the expropriation and demolition of several residential and religious buildings, including what was considered the oldest church in Madrid, the Santa Maria de la Almudena, in 1868. Construction of the new Almudena Cathedral began in 1879, this time adjacent to the Royal Palace on Bailén Street. The demolitions continued until 1883. On January 31, 1872 the first piece of iron was placed. The bridge was originally built in 1874 by the city engineer Eugene Barron Avignon, within the overall reform project based on Bailen Street, involving the creation of a large avenue, oriented nearly north-south, uniting two monuments, the Royal Palace and the San Francisco el Grande Basilica. This operation greatly improved the immediate neighborhood that was somewhat isolated, which is traditionally called morería vieja, the old Moorish quarter.

The first iron bridge was considered a technological and engineering feat at the time due to its great span. Crossing Segovia Street at a height of 23 meters, it had a length of 120 meters and was 13 meters wide, capable of withstanding pressures of four kilos per square meter. It was inaugurated on 13 October 1874.

=== The second viaduct ===
In 1931, The poor condition of the old viaduct caused the government of the Second Republic to hold a competition to design the current one; the contest was canceled by the College of Architects and reconvened the following year. The winning project was by the architect Francisco Javier Ferrero Lluisa. The primitive wood-and-iron viaduct was finally demolished in 1932, after a great deal of rehabilitation and reinforcement in the 1920s, since the first cracks were detected in 1925. The work was completed in 1934. The winning project was characterized by the use of polished concrete, affixed in granite piers.

The viaduct was damaged significantly by artillery in the Siege of Madrid during the Spanish Civil War, due to its proximity to the front lines. It was restored to original specifications and reopened on 28 March 1942. The traffic had become very intense, as Bailén Street had major automobile traffic in the 1950s and 1960s. The design of the viaduct was calculated for trams with thirteen-ton axle loads, which was ideal in the 1920s. By the early 1970s demand and structural load had become much greater than those calculated in the twenties.

=== The third viaduct ===
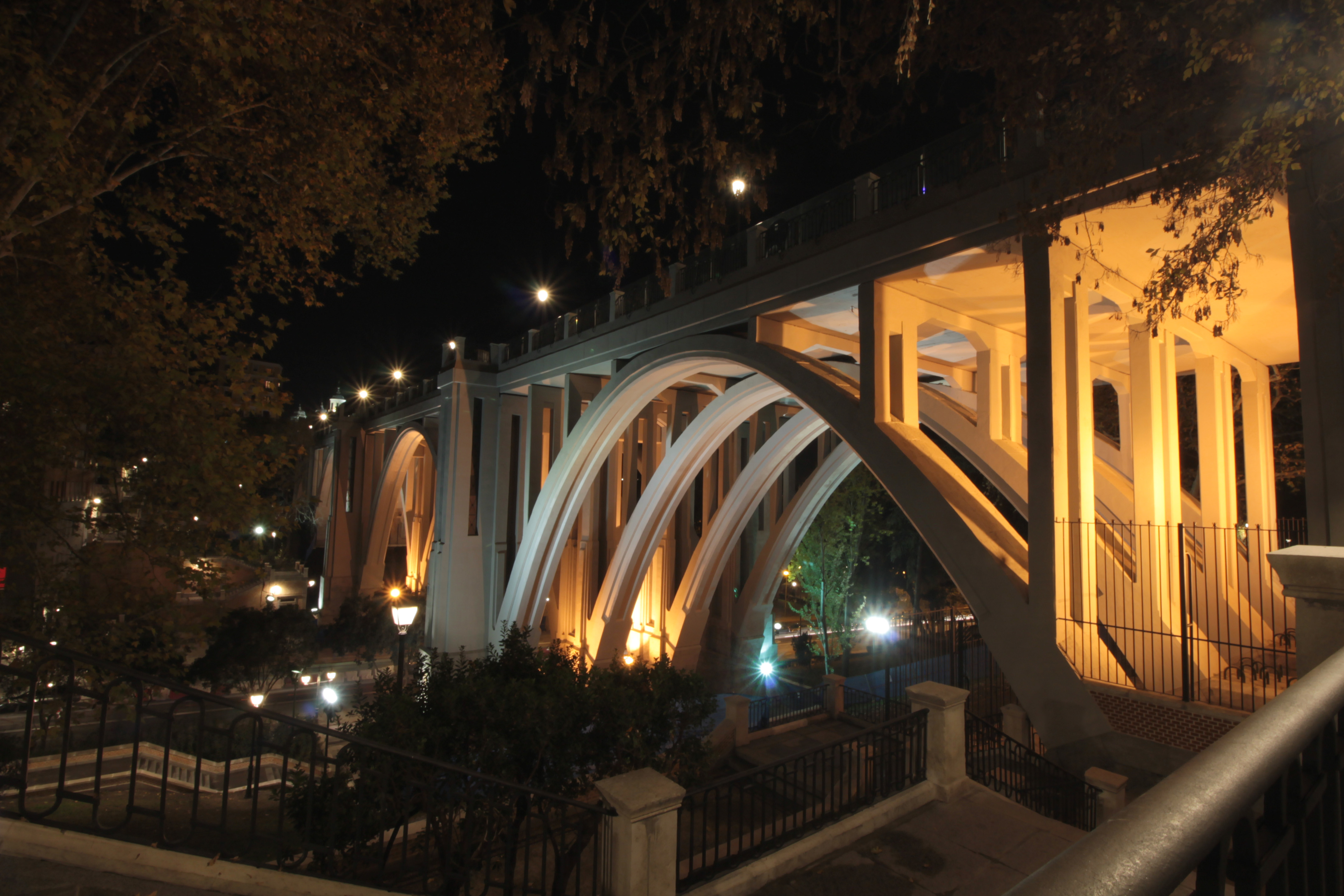
Night view of Segovia Viaduct.

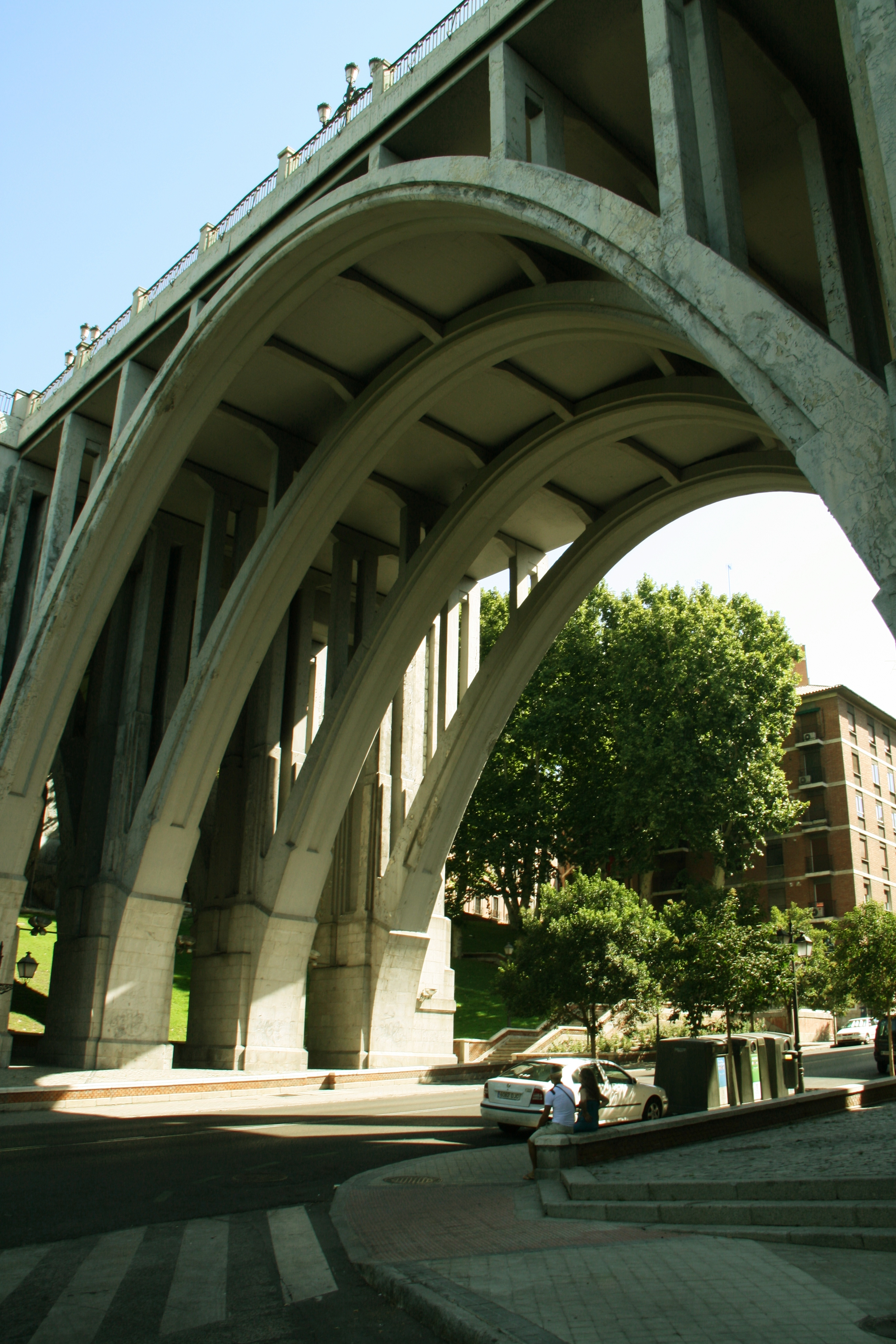
Viaducto de Segovia in 2009.

In 1974, in light of the results of a technical study of its deterioration, its restoration was proposed to Madrid City Hall. The same year its weight load was lightened by restricting use and traffic was completely halted on the viaduct in 1976. Bailén traffic was completely disrupted for a few years in the seventies. After considering the possibility of demolition and substituting it for a more modern one, a decision was finally made to refurbish and preserve it, which was carried out between 1977 and 1978, This reconstruction retains the shape of the second viaduct, increasing its height by two meters, its span by almost 200 meters, and its traffic capacity.

== Description ==
Segovia Viaduct is designed for heavy two-way vehicular traffic and has pedestrian sidewalks on either side. It has a drop of 25 meters at its highest point. This is a civil work with influences of rationalist architecture. It is built of polished concrete, while the bases of the pillars are covered with granite blocks. Crossing it provides a view of Casa de Campo, especially the lake.

== In popular culture ==
Since initial completion, the structure had always been a place that many people chose to commit suicide. This culminated in the 1990s, when suicides occurred at a rate of at least four per month. Even the first viaduct had to be fenced off due to multiple suicides. The total is unknown, but this would put the number at well over 500 just for the 20th century. It was often locally referred to as the suicide bridge. In October 1998, under the term of José María Álvarez del Manzano, the City of Madrid installed thick acrylic glass barriers to keep people from jumping off, partially due to the danger it was posing to pedestrian and vehicular traffic below. It has been successful at deterring further jumpers.

It features frequently in the literary-bohemian world of Madrid in works by authors such as Valle-Inclán (Bohemian Lights), and Benito Pérez Galdós. The second viaduct is present in several novels by authors such as Enrique Jardiel Poncela, as well as Camilo José Cela. It appears often in Spanish cinema, including Matador, High Heels and I'm So Excited! (2013) by Pedro Almodóvar.

== See also ==
- Architecture of Madrid
