= Albarrana tower =

Medieval defensive architectural structure

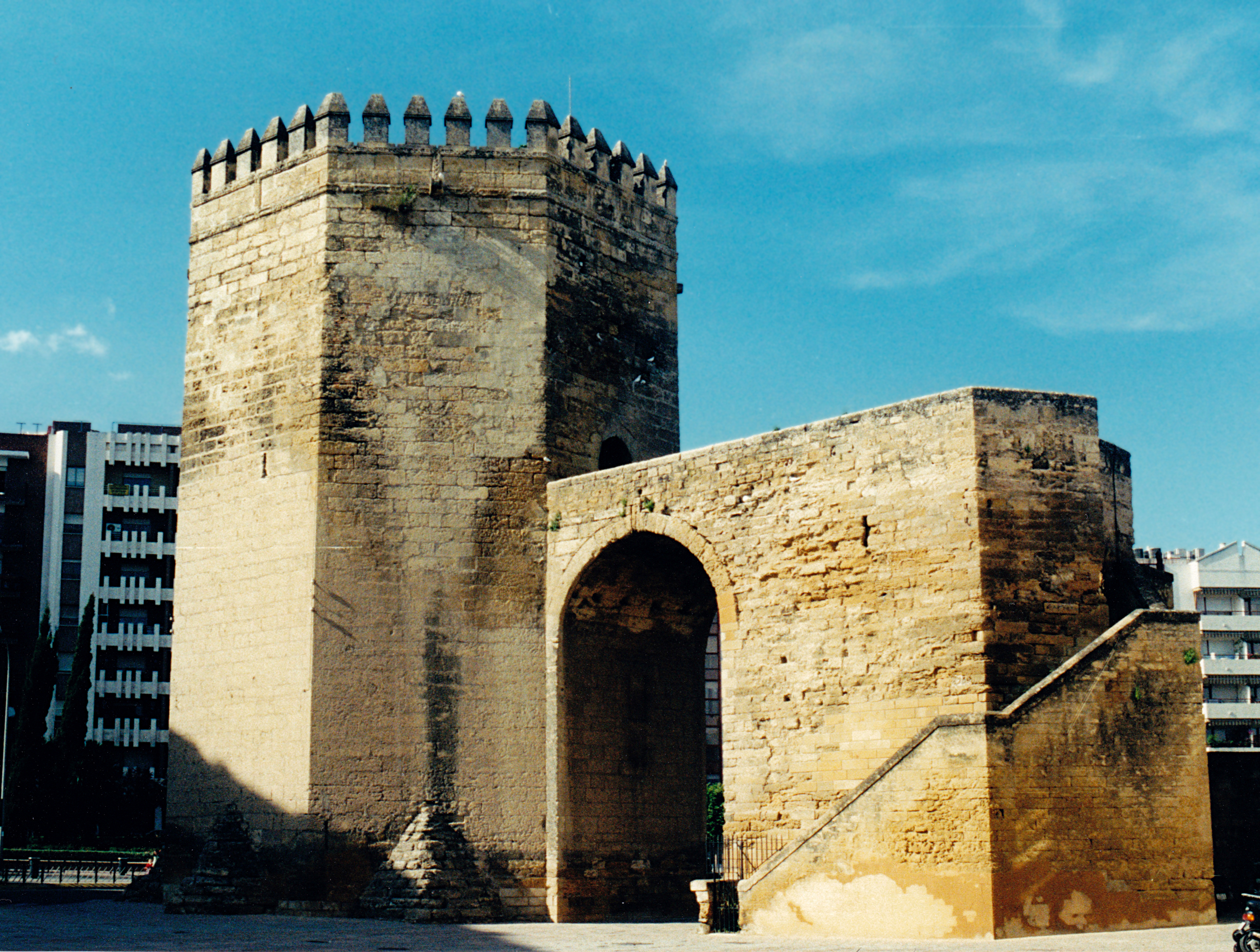
Torre de la Malmuerta in Cordoba

An albarrana tower (Arabic: البراني, romanized: al-barrānī, lit. 'exterior') is a defensive tower detached from the curtain wall and connected to it by a bridge or an arcade. They were built by Muslims when they occupied the Iberian Peninsula between the 8th and the 15th centuries, especially from the 12th century during the Almohad dynasty and mainly in the south of Spain and Portugal where the Islamic influence was the longest. In Spanish, they are called torre albarrana.

== Background ==
The earliest albarrana towers were often pentagonal or octagonal in plan (e.g. Badajoz, Tarifa, Seville) but later a rectangular plan became the norm. Having been built several meters in front of the curtain wall, they were only accessible from there by a (bridged or arched) walkway containing a removable wooden section allowing the tower to be isolated from the wall if the tower were to be occupied by attacking forces. North of the Iberian peninsula, flanking towers usually remained a structural part of the (stone) curtain wall.

Albarrana towers are almost uniquely confined to the Iberian Peninsula. Even in other Muslim-controlled territories of the medieval world this defensive feature was not used, except for a notable example in the Citadel of Aleppo in Syria. The only known albarrana tower in England can be found at Pontefract Castle. The castle now lies in ruins, but the remains of an albarrana tower called Swillington Tower are still visible just to the north of the castle's slighted curtain wall.

Some known albarrana towers are:

- Torre de Espantaperros in Badajoz, Spain. Probably the first albarrana tower, built by Abu Yaqub Yusuf in 1170. Its plan is octagonal.
- Torre del Oro, Torre de la Plata in Sevilla
- Torre de la Malmuerta in Cordoba
- Town of Talavera de la Reina near Toledo with several albarrana towers
- Òdena castle near Barcelona
- Castle of Paderne in Portugal
- 2 albarrana towers in the Santa Catalina castle in Jaén
- Castle of Loulé in Portugal

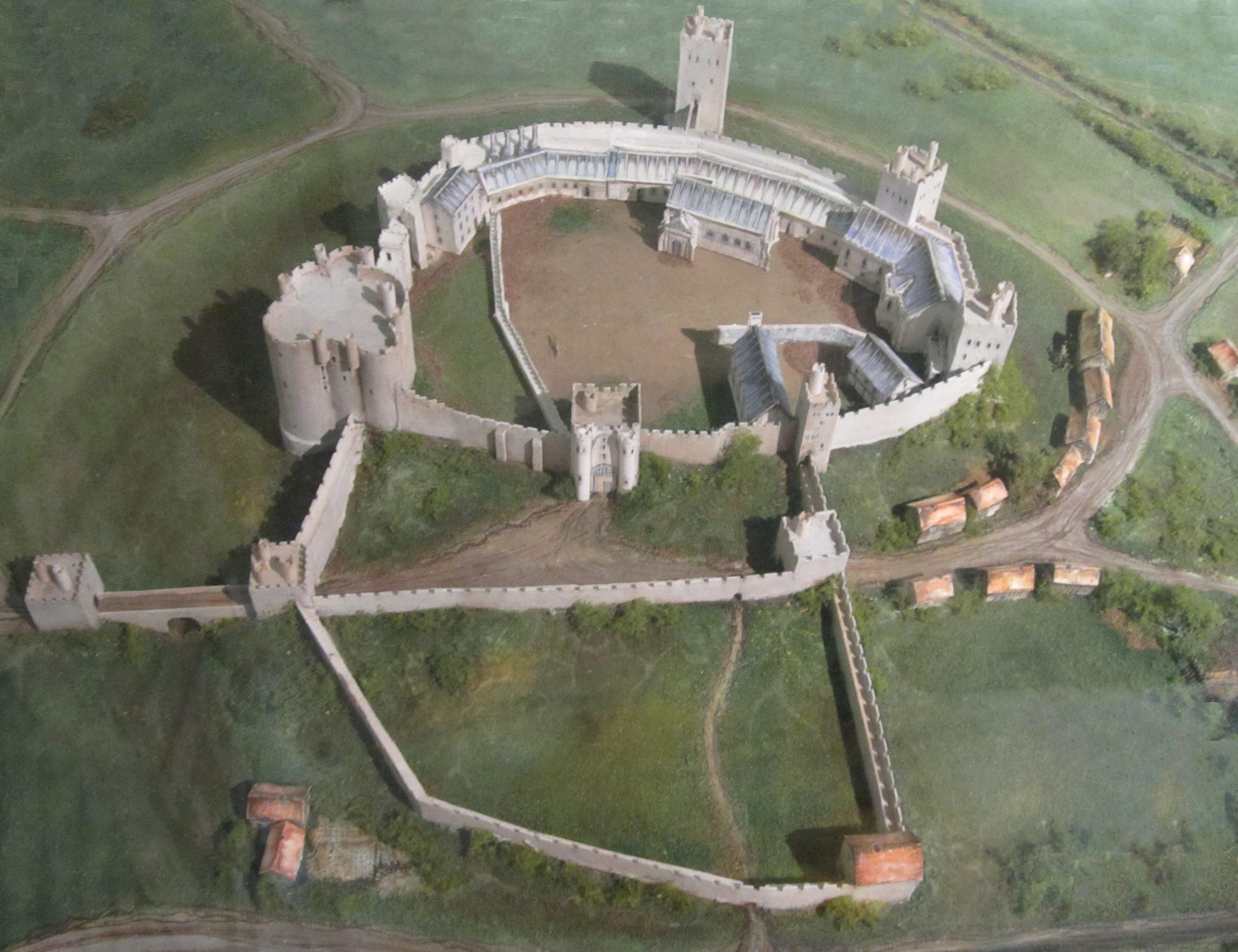
Model of Pontefract Castle, Yorkshire

== Gallery ==
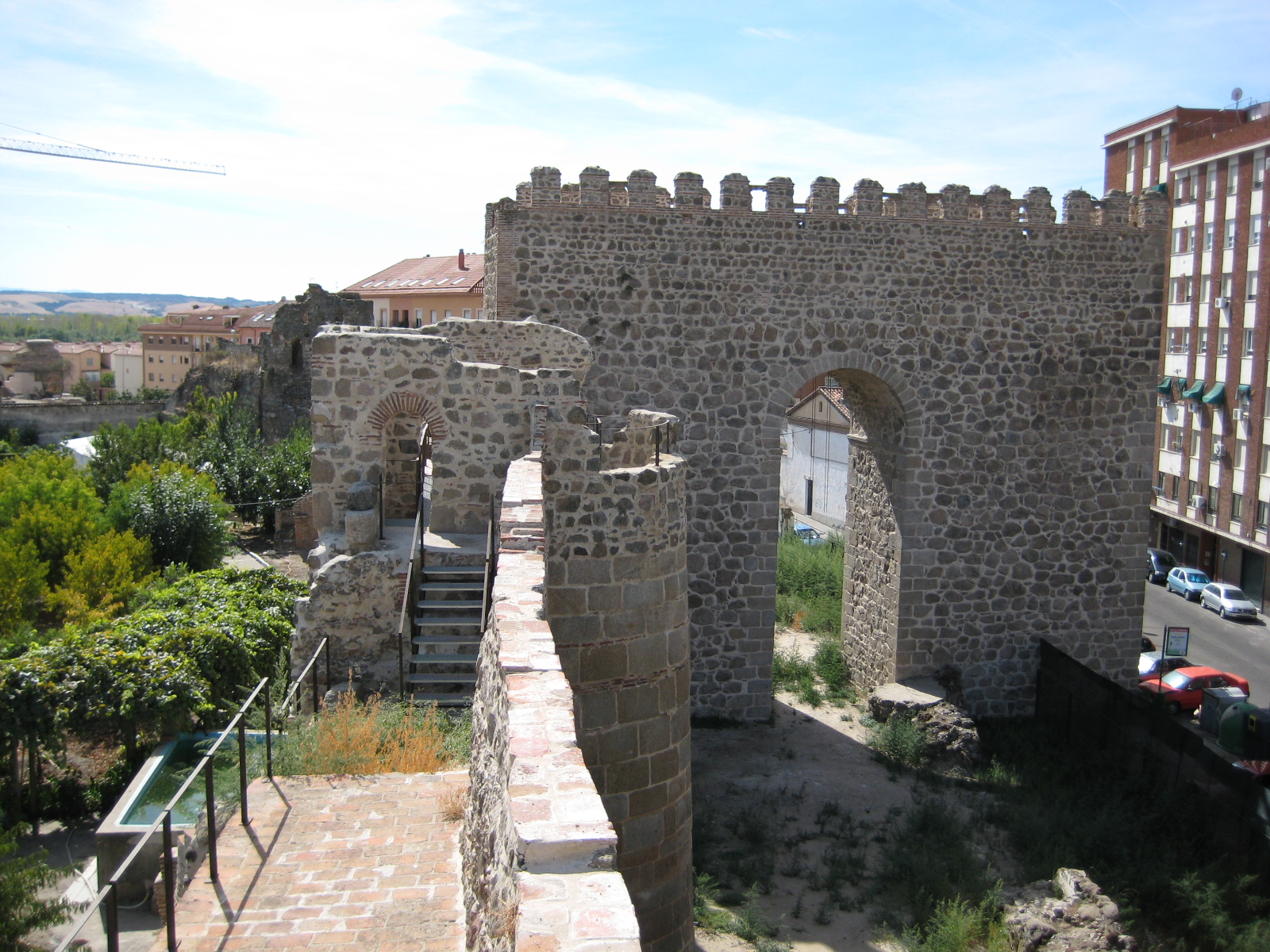
Albarrana tower in the town of Talavera de la Reina

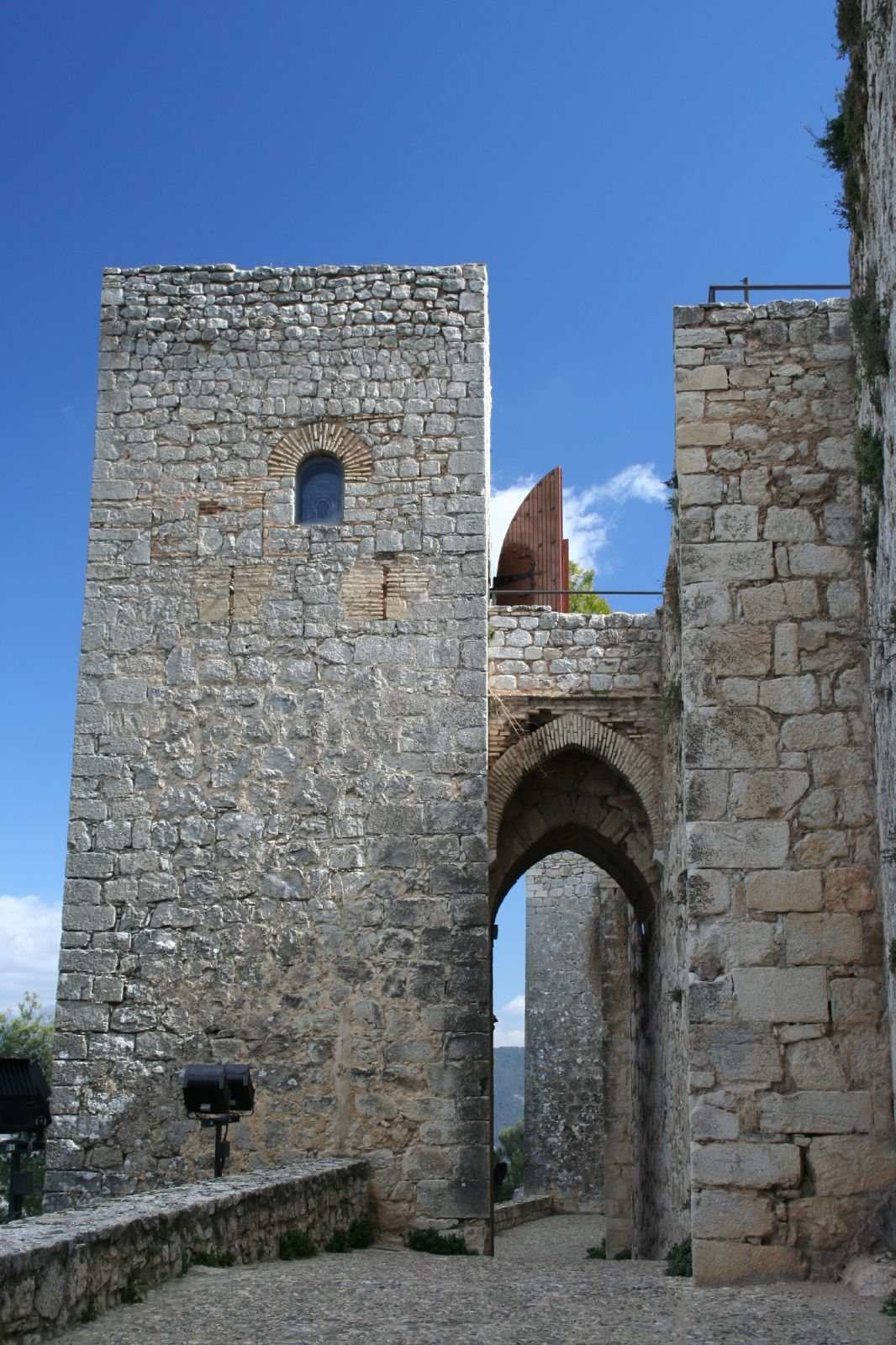
One of the 2 albarrana towers in the castle of Santa Catalina in Jaén

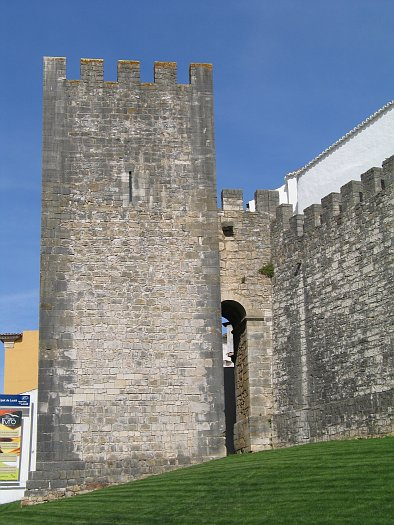
Albarrana tower in the castle of Loulé (Portugal)

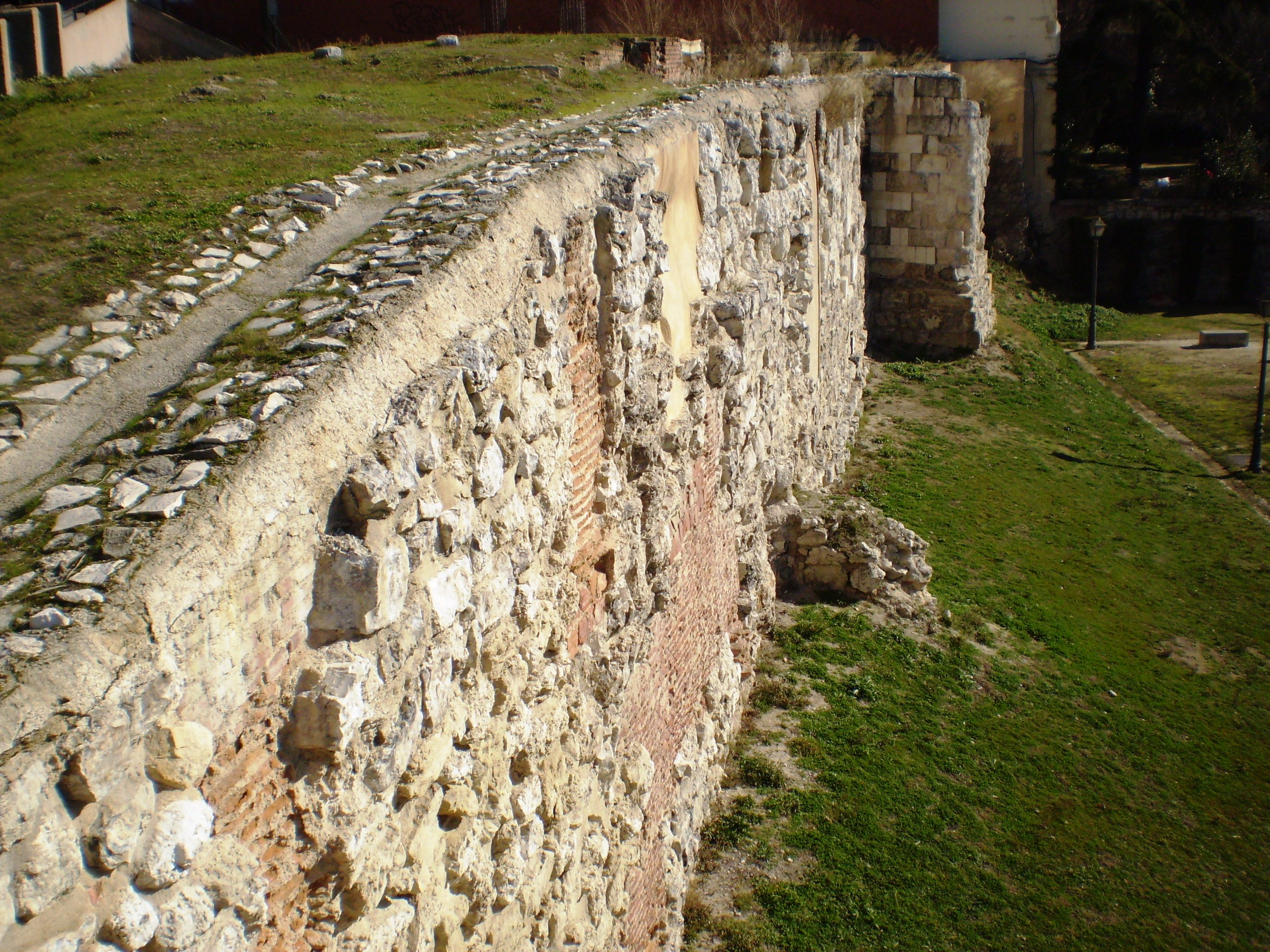
Tower of Narigües
