= Plaza de Oriente =

Square in Madrid, Spain

Coordinates: 40°25′6.02″N 3°42′45.31″W

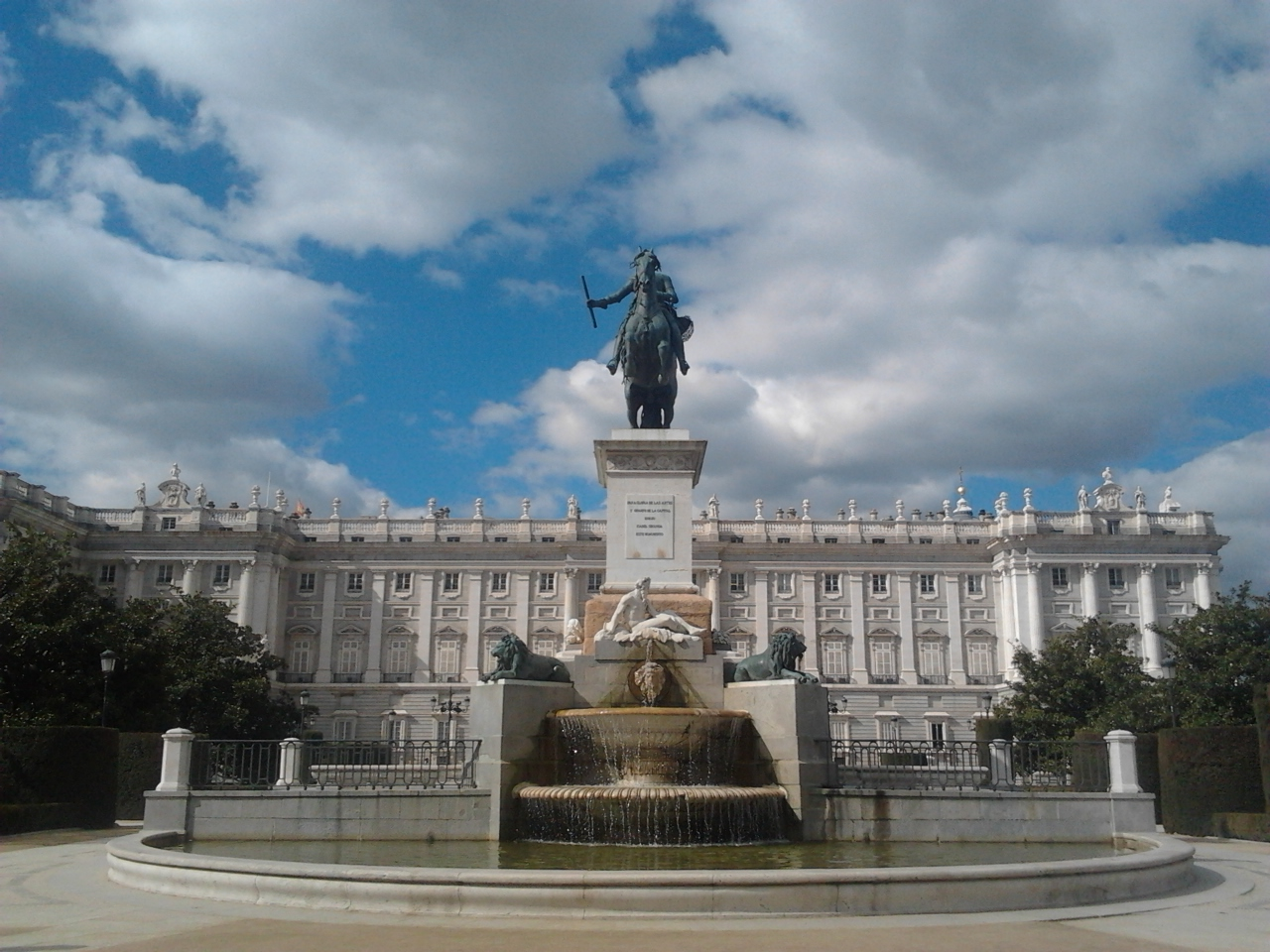
- View of the park facing the Royal Palace
- Interactive map of Plaza de Oriente
- Location: Madrid, Spain

The Plaza de Oriente is a square in the historic center of Madrid, Spain. Rectangular in shape and monumental in character, it was designed in 1844 by Narciso Pascual y Colomer. The square was propagated by King Joseph I, who ordered the demolition of the medieval houses on the site.

It is located between some important landmarks in Madrid: To the west is the Royal Palace, the Teatro Real ("Royal Theater") to the east, and the Royal Monastery of the Incarnation to the north.

The plaza has statues of 44 Spanish kings from the medieval period, including:

- Alfonso I of Asturias
- Alfonso II of Asturias
- Euric

== Buildings around the square ==
- Royal Palace of Madrid
- Teatro Real
- Royal Monastery of La Encarnación

== Monument to Philip IV ==
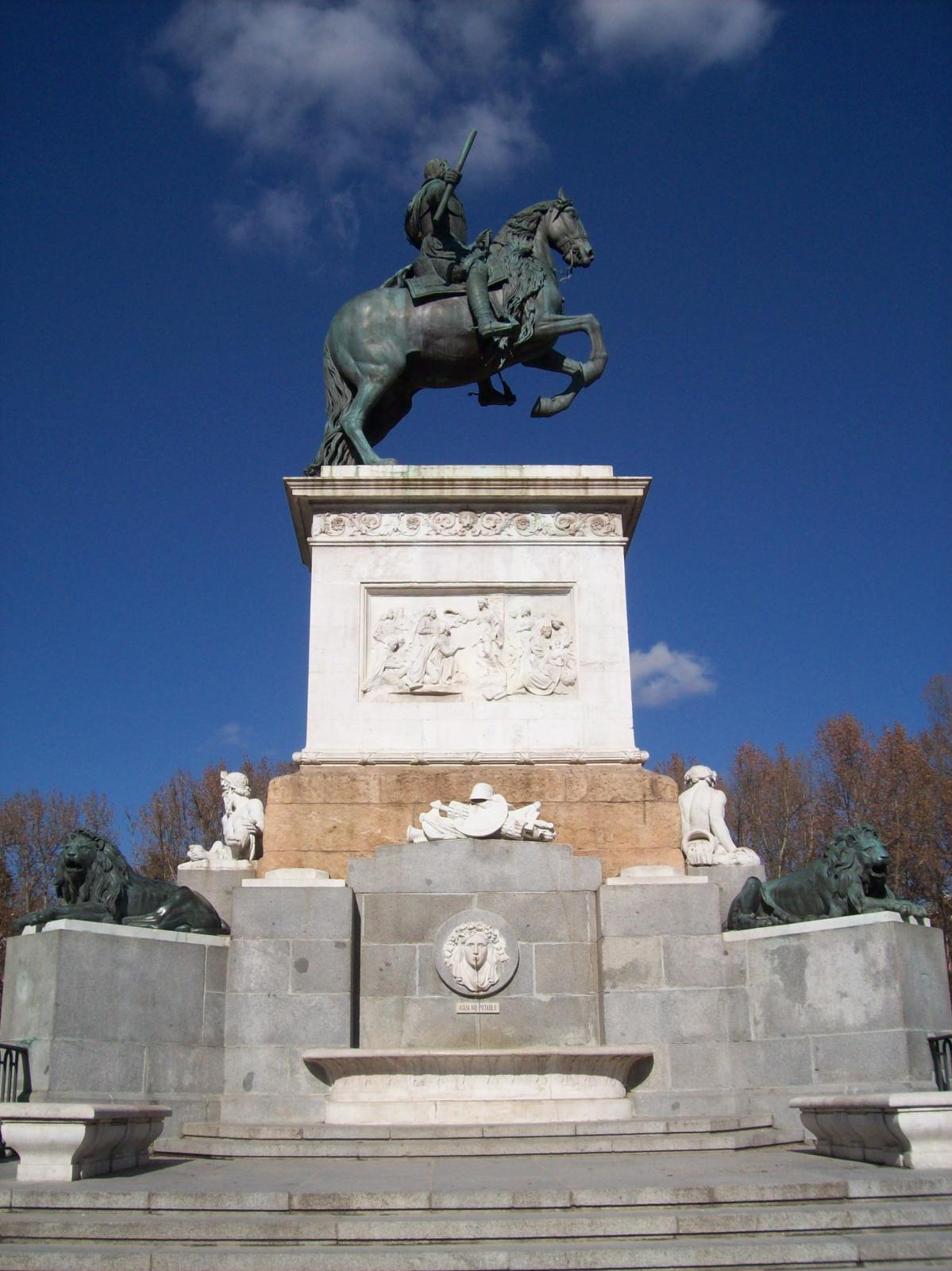
Monument to Philip IV by Pietro Tacca

At the heart of the Plaza de Oriente lies a monument dedicated to Philip IV of Spain.
