= The Public (disambiguation) =

The Public is the people and society of a nation or community, or the whole of humanity.

(The) Public may also refer to:

- The Public (film), a 2018 film written and directed by Emilio Estevez
- The Public (play), a 1930 play by Federico García Lorca, known in the original Spanish as El público
- The Public (opera), an opera by Mauricio Sotelo, based on the play
- The Public (Chicago newspaper), a news journal published 1898–1919
- The Public (alternative newspaper), alternative newsweekly in Buffalo, New York.
- The Public Theater, a theatre company in New York City
- The Public, West Bromwich, an English community arts project based in West Bromwich
- Public (album), a 1998 album by Emm Gryne
- Public (band), an American pop rock band
- Public (restaurant), a restaurant in New York City
- Public land

== See also ==
- The Phantom Public, a 1925 book by Walter Lippmann
