= Thomas Tatzl =

Austrian operatic baritone

Thomas Tatzl (born 1980) is an Austrian operatic bass-baritone.

== Life ==
Born in Aflenz, Steiermark, Tatzl first received singing lessons from Sigrid Rennert and later took up studies at the University of Music and Performing Arts Graz. He then moved to the University of Music and Performing Arts Vienna, where he studied with Karlheinz Hanser (opera) and Robert Holl (lied and oratorio). He also took part in master classes with Thomas Quasthoff, Helena Łazarska and Tom Krause.

In 2010, he graduated with honours in song and opera. After his success in the role of Papageno at the 2012 Salzburg Festival in Peter von Winter's The Labyrinth, engagements followed at the Palau de les Arts Reina Sofía, Teatro Regio di Torino, Teatro dell'Opera di Roma, Zürich Opera House, Cologne Opera, Teatro La Fenice, Teatro Real and many more.

Tatzl made his debut in 2017/18 at the Vienna State Opera and at the Bavarian State Opera in Munich in the role of Harlekin. In the same year, he sang in the US at New York City's most important and famous cultural centre, the Lincoln Center for the Performing Arts and performed at the National Centre for the Performing Arts in Beijing. This was followed in 2019 by his debut at la Scala.

== Repertoire ==
Excerpt of sung roles :

- Figaro, Conte d'Almaviva in Le nozze di Figaro
- Don Giovanni, Masetto in Don Giovanni
- Ford in Falstaff
- Guglielmo in Così fan tutte
- Papageno in Die Zauberflöte
- Harlekin in Ariadne auf Naxos

== Recordings ==
DVDs

- Mauricio Sotelo: The Public (Opera in 2 acts); Release date: 11 November 2016
- Peter von Winter: Das Labyrinth (Der Zauberflöte zweyter Theil)

== Finalist and prize-winner in singing competitions ==
- Scholarship holder of the Hildegard Zadek Foundation (2008)
- Internationaler Hilde-Zadek-Gesangswettbewerb (Vienna 2009)
- Concorso di cantanti lirici (Spoleto 2009)
- Richard Tauber Competition (London 2010)
- Concours Ernst Haefliger (Gstaad 2010)
- Würdigungspreis der Universität für Musik und Darstellende Kunst (Vienna 2010)
- Das Lied (Berlin 2011)
