= Make You Mine =

Make You Mine may refer to:

- "Make You Mine" (Nina song), 2003
- "Make You Mine" (Talay Riley song), 2011
- "Make You Mine" (High Valley song), 2014
- "Make You Mine" (Madison Beer song), 2024
- "Make You Mine", 2006 song by Vanessa Hudgens from V
- "Make You Mine", 2008 song by Miami Horror from Bravado
- "Make You Mine", 2008 song by Crossin Dixon
- "Make You Mine", 2009 song by the Drums from Summertime!
- "Make You Mine", 2011 single by 2AM Club from What Did You Think Was Going to Happen?
- "Make You Mine", 2014 song by Public
