= Fountain of the Pear Tree Canals =

Ancient fountain in Madrid

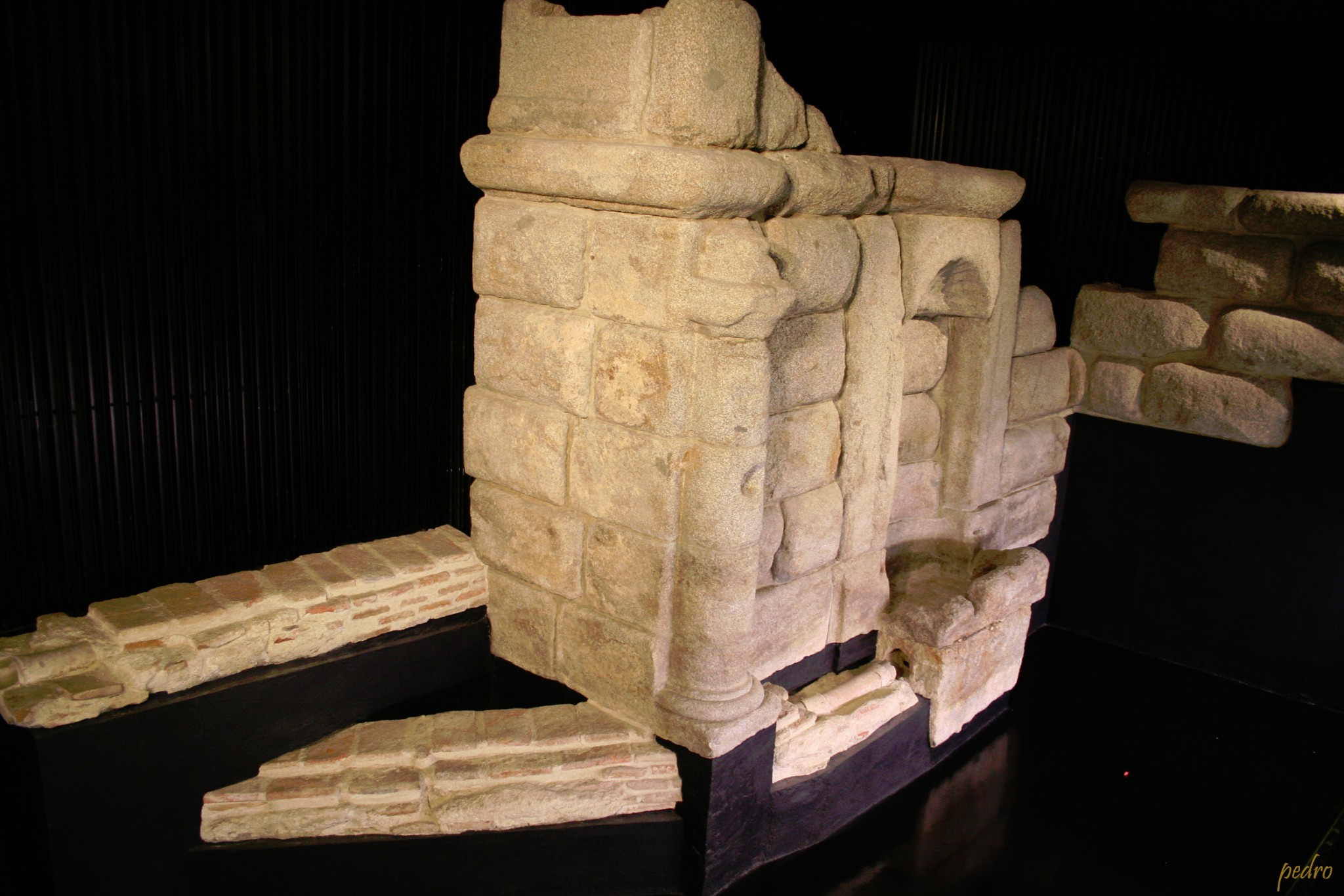
An original water outlet from the fountains

The Fountain of the Pear Tree Canals (Spanish: Fuente de los Caños del Peral) is an ancient fountain discovered buried under the Plaza de Isabel II in Madrid, Spain, in 2009. The name comes from a 13th-century pear tree that shaded the source spring at the fountain's location. The fountain is also known as the Spanish: Lavadero de los Caños del Peral (Laundry of the Pear Tree Canals).

== Background ==
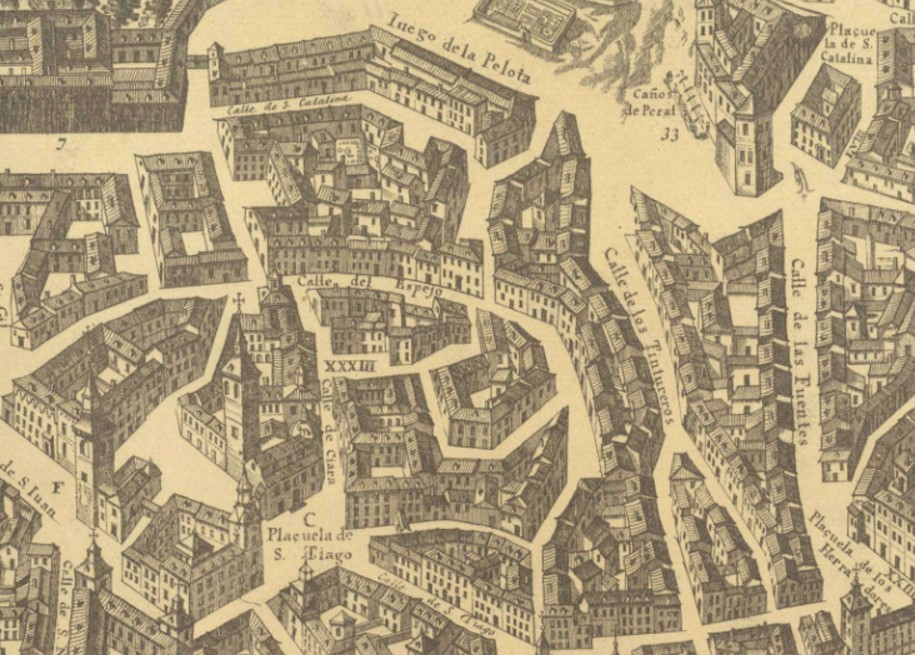
Detail of the Topographia de la Villa de Madrid . The Caños del Peral Fountain is represented in the upper right, with the number 33.

The fountain was documented variously in the 15th century as Hontanillas or Fontanillas and is thought to have been one of the first hammams ("Turkish baths") in Madrid. Water from the canals supplied the population of Madrid through a distribution system made up of water carriers. The water was also used by the “lavadores,” or clothes washers. The discovered part was built in the 17th century and was originally 34 m (112 ft) in length, occupying a small valley at the end of Arenal Street. It featured granite ashlars in a padded style.

The fountains shared the water from the spring with the royal palace until the mid 18th century. The spring water was transported to the palace via an aqueduct named the Amaniel. It continued to be used as a fountain until it was buried in 1809. It was buried 8 m (26 ft) deep, along with the spring's source, and was paved over to prepare for the building of the Teatro Real, the Plaza de Oriente, and the Plaza de Isabel II.

Work began on reconditioning the Ópera Metro station that served the Teatro Real and the two plazas in 2009, which led to the rediscovery of the fountain. Once the restorative work was completed in 2011 the upgraded station, now including an archeological museum, was opened to the public. The museum showcases the fountain of the canals along with other relics found at the site, such as the original parts of the Arenal Sewer, and the royal Amaniel Aqueduct. The museum, accessed from the lobby of the Ópera station, is 200 m^{2} (2,200 sq ft) in size and free to anyone with a metro ticket. Madrid has a reputation for being built on water.

A replica of a small part of the fountains was erected in the Plaza Isabel to honour the discovery.

== Gallery ==
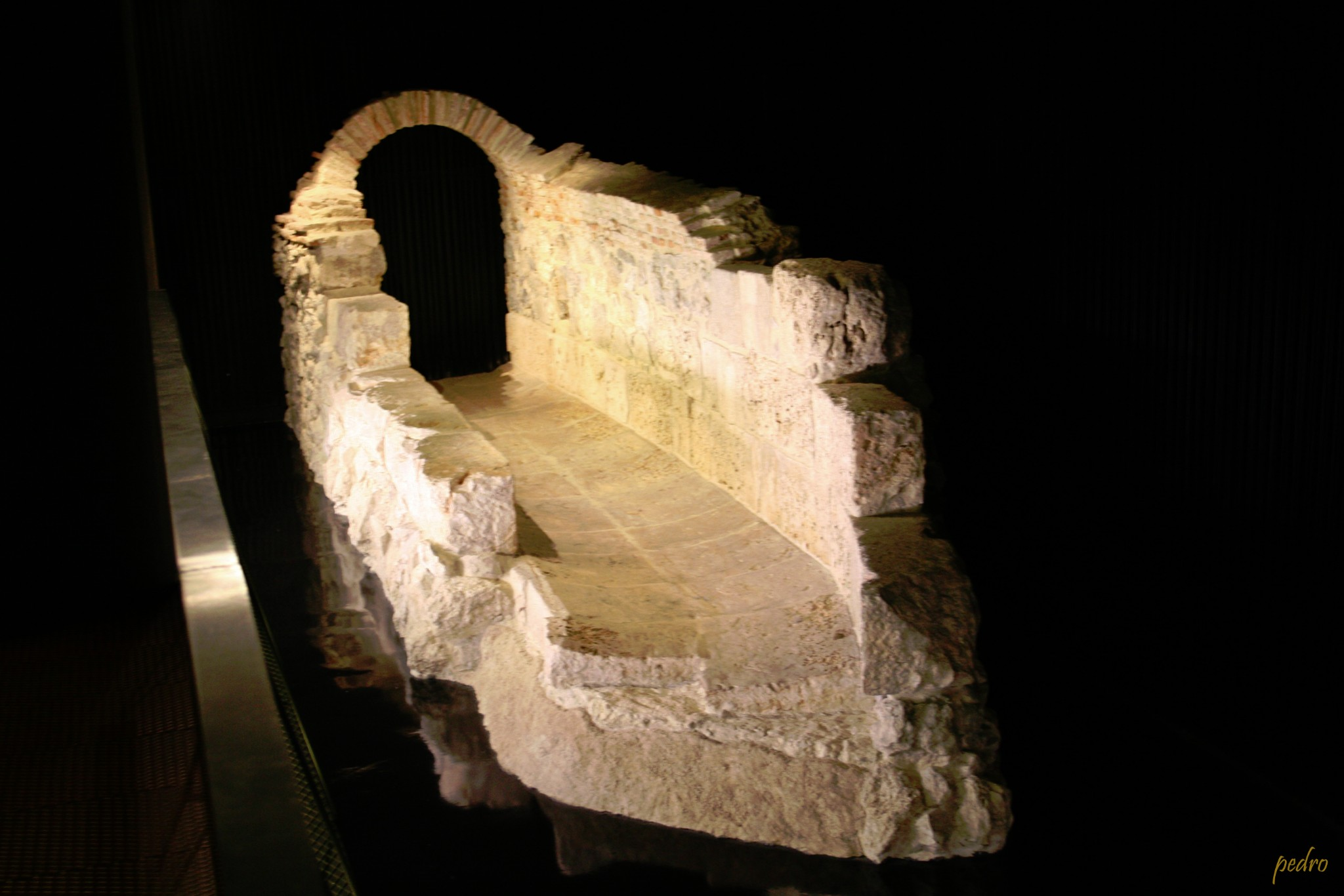
Arenal Sewer

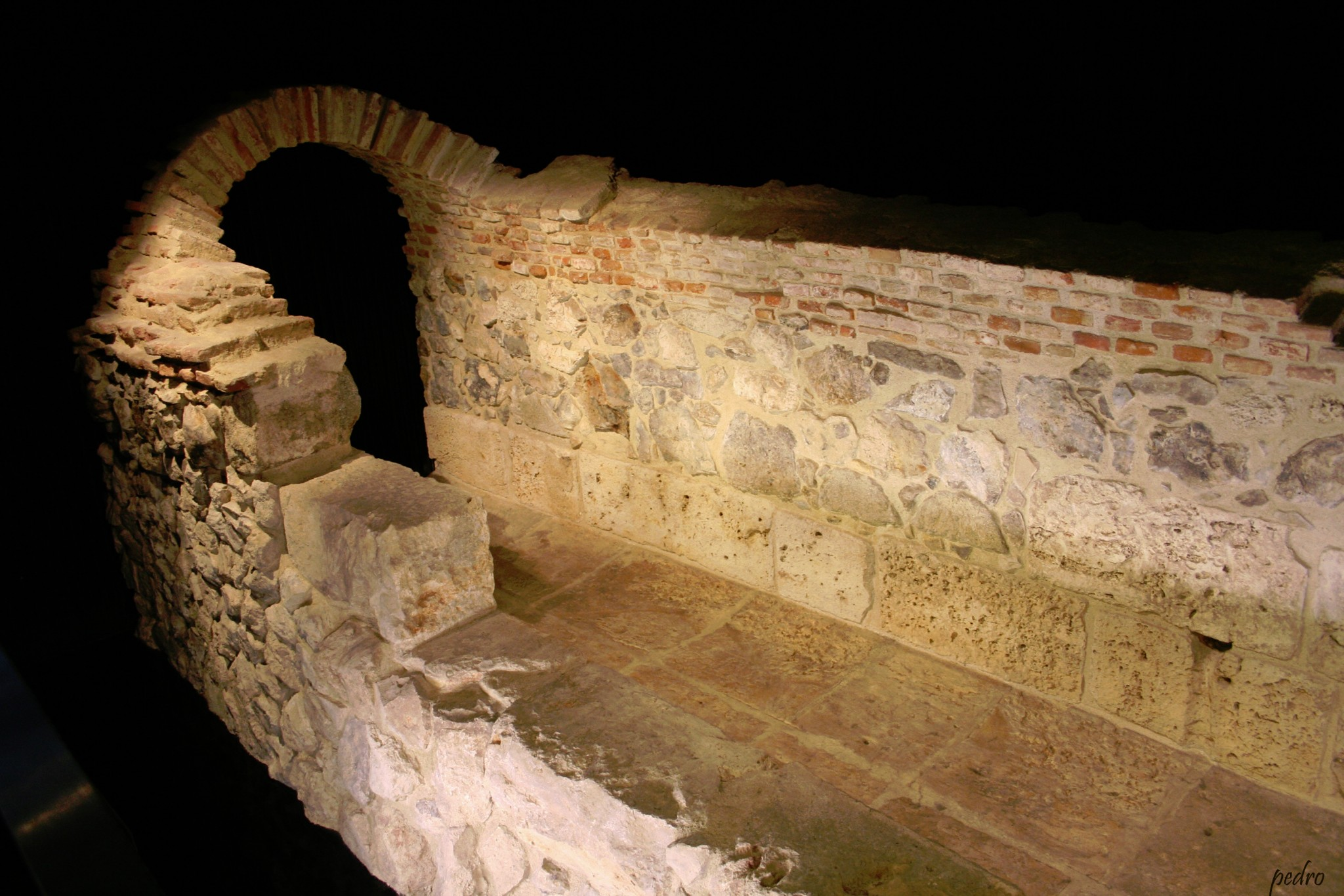
Arenal Sewer

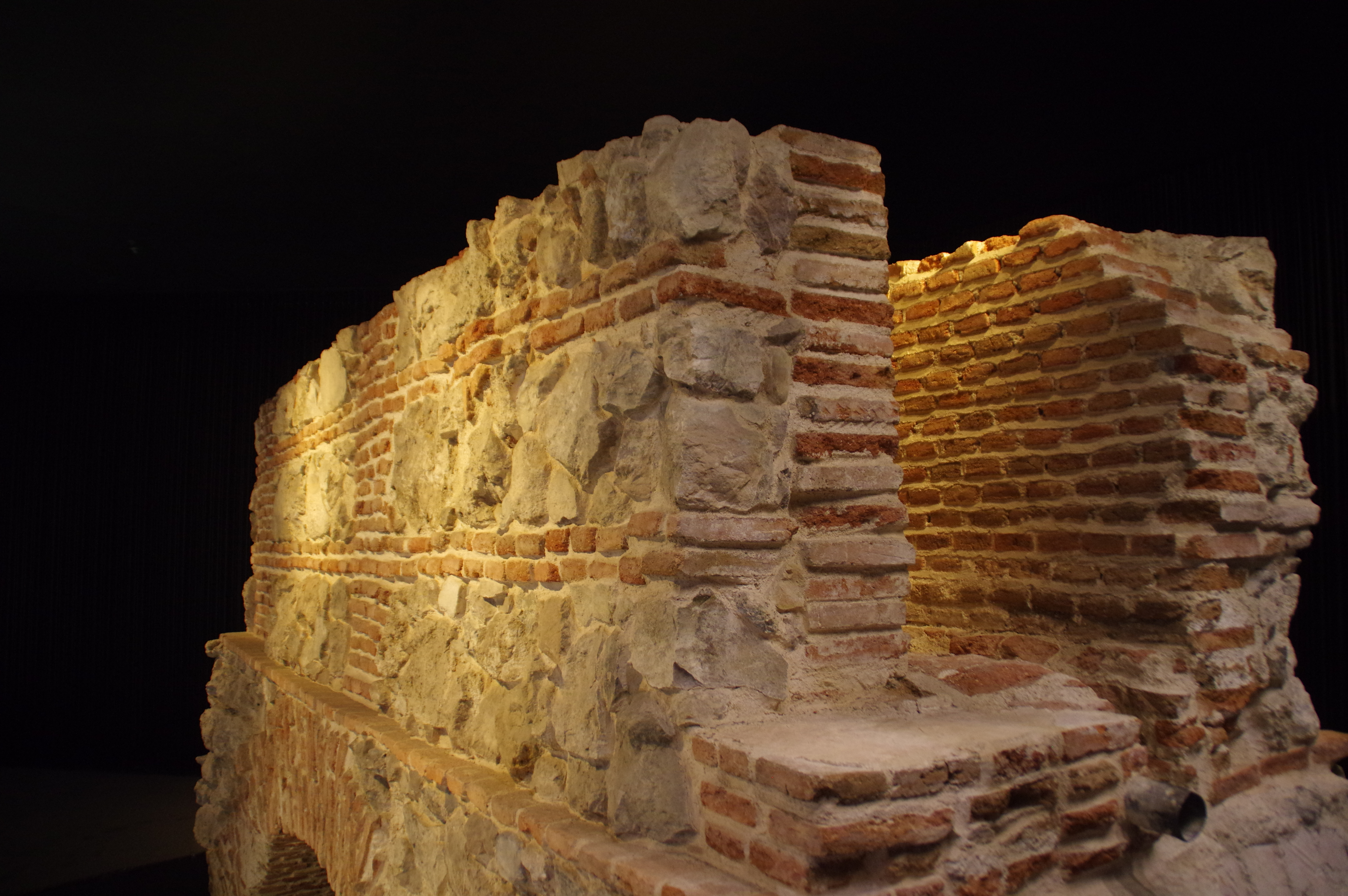
Royal Amaniel Aqueduct

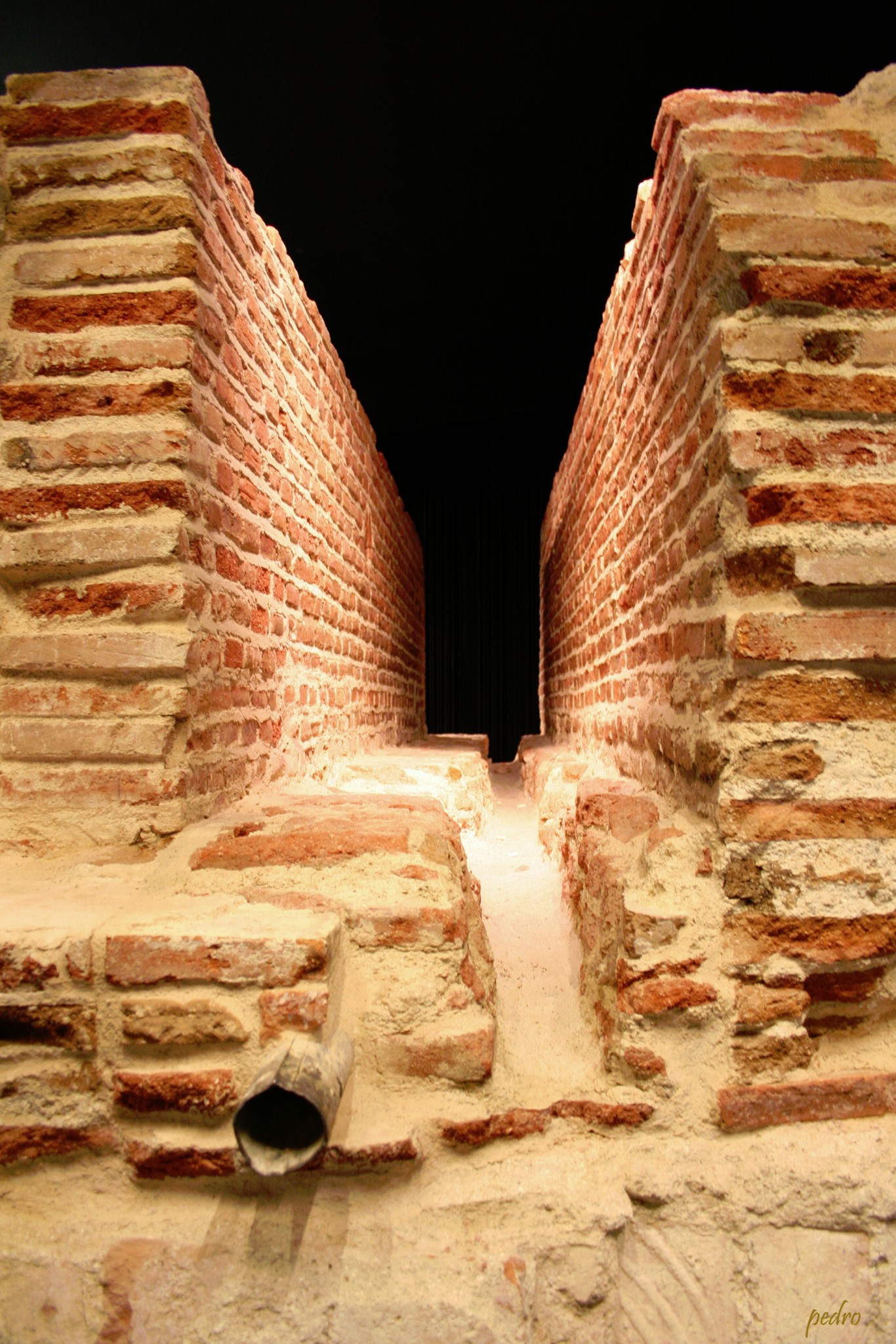
Royal Amaniel Aqueduct

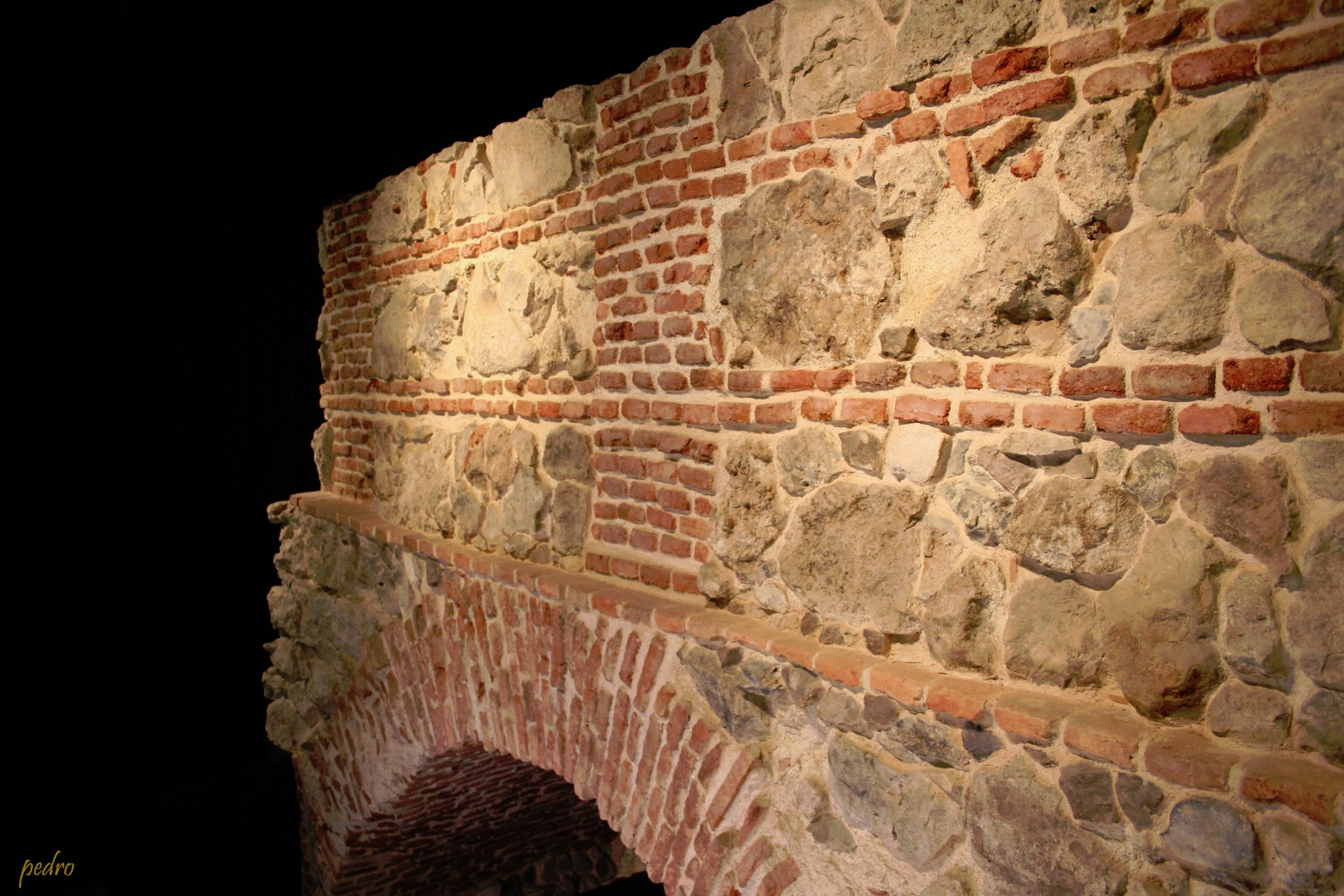
Royal Amaniel Aqueduct
