= Plaza de Isabel II =

Public square in Madrid

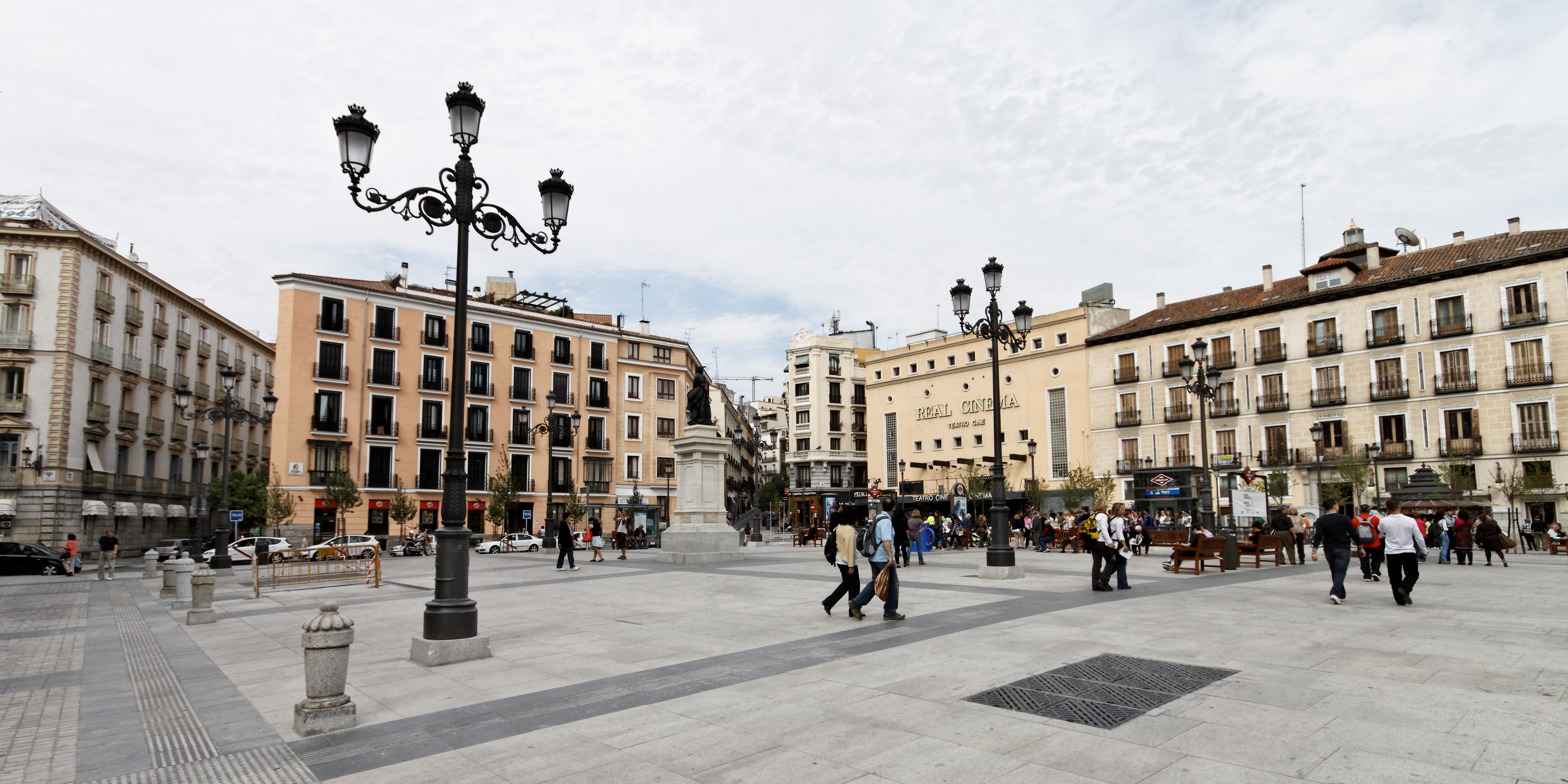
- "Opera Square" after its 2011 remodeling
- Interactive map of Plaza de Isabel II
- Location: Madrid, Spain
- Coordinates: 40°25′05″N 3°42′34″W

The Plaza de Isabel II (also known as Plaza de Ópera) is a historic public square between the Sol and Palacio wards in the central district of Madrid. The plaza is at the convergence of Arenal Street (from the Puerta del Sol) and the minor roads Arrieta, Calle de Campomanes, Caños del Peral, Escalinata and Vergara. It was formed by filling the ravine created by the Arenal stream and the source of the Fountain of the Canals of the Pear Tree. The square occupies part of the site where the old Theater of the Caños del Peral stood between 1738 and 1817.

The Teatro Real opera house, which sits on the western edge of the plaza, was ordered to be constructed by Isabella II for whom the plaza is now named.

== Background ==
In the Middle Ages, a ravine formed by Madrid's Arenal stream served as a natural defensive moat on the edge of the Christian wall, near the Valnadú Gate. Some remains of the ravine are preserved in the adjacent roads, as is the tower of the Stairway Street. Between the 15th and 18th centuries, this space was known as the "Caños del Peral" and is thought to be the source of the Walls del Arrabal.

After the 1868 Glorious Revolution, the square was called Plaza de Prim, after Juan Prim, although it was popularly known as "Plaza del Barranco" due to the depression formed by the slope of Arenal Street and the Costanilla de los Ángeles. These gullies would be later filled during the reign of Isabella II when the Royal Theater was built.

Also in 1868, a statue of Isabel II, commissioned by Manuel López Santaella, and made by sculptor José Piquer Duart, was placed in the center of the square. A year later, the statue was taken down and placed in the Royal Theater. It was replaced by an allegorical sculpture of Comedy by sculptor Francisco Elías Vallejo. The statue of Isabel II was returned to the square in 1905.

== Fountain of the Canals of the Pear Tree ==
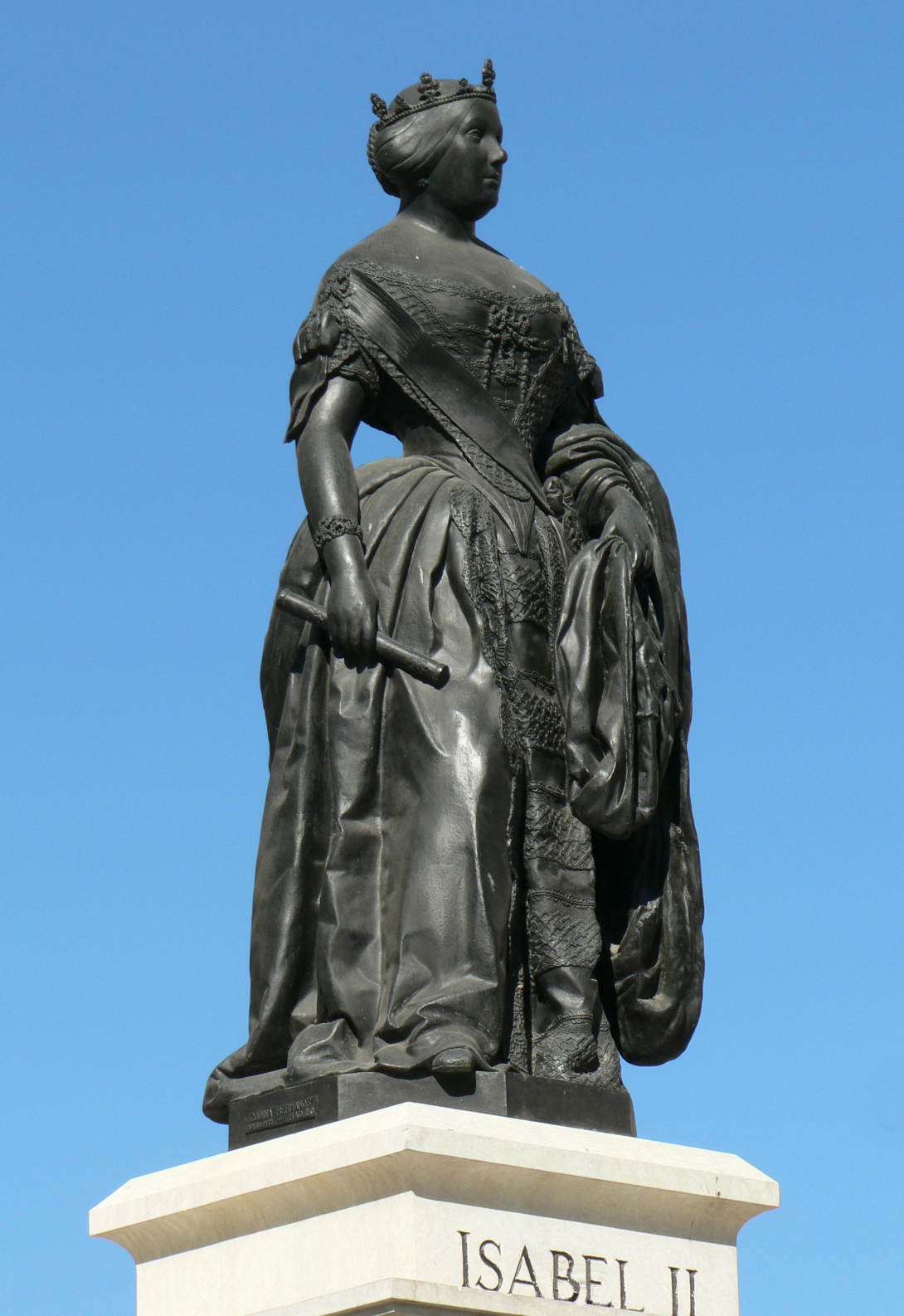
Bronze statue of Isabel II

In Pedro Teixeira's 1656 work Topographia de la Villa de Madrid, the Fountain of the Canals of the Pear Tree appears. A spring that supplied the primitive medieval "qanats" and as a water source for the royal palace was covered over in 1809. Eventually, the entire area was developed, filling in the area around the Arenal ravine. The area facing the Royal Palace was also developed and is now the Plaza de Oriente. The fountain was rediscovered in 1990 with the remodeling of the Ópera station of the Line 2 of the Madrid Metro. Between 2008 and 2011, the space underwent a new renovation, which left interesting archaeological remains of the historic Madrid water system on display.

=== In film ===
In 1980, the plaza was featured in the opening scene of the Fernando Trueba film Ópera prima.
