= The Public (play) =

Theatrical play by Federico García Lorca

- Original language: Spanish
- Written by: Federico García Lorca
- Characters: Director Enrique; Manservant; Four White Horses; First Man Gonzalo; Second Man; Third Man; Fourth Man; Helen; Vine Leaves; Bells; First Boy; Centurion; Emperor; Juliet; Black Horse; Pierrot Costume; Ballerina Costume; Pyjama Costume; Male Nurse; Naked Man; Five Students; Three Ladies; Second Boy; Two Thieves; Prompter; Idiot Shepherd; Magician; Harlequin; Lady in Black Gonzalo's Mother
- Setting: The Director's room, A Roman Ruin

Premiere
- Date: 15 February 1978
- Place: University of Puerto Rico

The Public (El público), also known as The Audience, is a play by the twentieth-century Spanish dramatist Federico García Lorca. It was written between 1929 and 1930. The two complete manuscripts which once existed have not been found, and may be lost. All that is known is an earlier draft, missing an act. It remained unpublished until 1978 and did not receive its first professional theatrical production until 1986. The world premiere of the play was directed by Victoria Espinosa on 15 February 1978 at the University of Puerto Rico.

== Production history ==
The Public was first presented at the University of Puerto Rico on 15 February 1978, where it was directed by Victoria Espinosa. Her staging included surrealistic paintings. A translated version by Henry Livings (in consultation with the director/designer, Ultz) was first performed on 3 October 1988 at the Theatre Royal Stratford East. The U.S. premiere opened at the Shepard Theatre Complex in Los Angeles, California, on February 23, 1989, and was presented by Kaliyuga Arts. The production was directed and designed by John Sowle, with costumes by Silvia Jahnsons and incidental music composed by Jules Langert, and featured Robert J. Bennett, Denise Y. Dowse, Roger Gutierrez, Alex Katehakis, Kevin Kirby, Khin-Kyaw Maung, Richard Neil, Steven Patterson, Jane Thurow, Richard Vidan, Courtney Walsh and B. Wyatt in the cast.

Mauricio Sotelo composed an opera based on the play: The Public premiered in 2015 at the Teatro Real in Madrid, Spain.
