= The Public (opera) =

- Opera by Mauricio Sotelo
- Librettist: Andrés Ibáñez
- Language: Spanish
- Based on: The Public, a play by Federico García Lorca
- Premiere: February 24th- March 13, 2015. Teatro Real
- Website: https://www.teatroreal.es/en

The Public (El público), opera in five scenes with a prologue is an opera by the Spanish composer Mauricio Sotelo. The libretto was written by Andrés Ibáñez, based on the play of the same name by Federico García Lorca. It premiered on February 24, 2015, at the Teatro Real in Madrid, Spain. This creation was a new production commissioned by Gerard Mortier, artistic director of the Teatro Real de Madrid between 2010 and 2013.

== Artistic team ==
- Music director: Pablo Heras-Casado
- Stage director: Robert Castro
- Set designer: Alexander Polzin
- Costume designer: Wojciech Dziedzic
- Lighting designer: Urs Schönebaum
- Choreographer: Darrell Grand Moultrie
- Electronic music preparation: Mauro Lanza
- Sound engineering: Peter Böhm
- Choir director: Andrés Máspero

=== Cast ===
- Director (Enrique) / Figure in Vine Leaves: José Antonio López (baritone)
- First White Horse: Arcángel (cantaor)
- Second White Horse: Jesús Méndez (cantaor)
- Third White Horse: Rubén Olmo (bailaor)
- First Man (Gonzalo) / Figure in Bells / Red nude: Thomas Tatzl (baritone)
- Second Man / First White Horse / Centurion: Josep Miquel Ramón (baritone)
- Third Man / Black Horse / Idiot shepherd: Antonio Lozano (tenor)
- Elena / Lady Gun-Brit Barkmin: (soprano)
- Emperor / Magician: Eric Caves (tenor)
- Juliet / Boy: Isabella Gaudí (soprano)
- Manservant / Male nurse: José San Antonio (baritone)
- Pierrot costume: Haizam Fathy (dancer-actor)
- Ballerina costume: Leonardo Cremaschi (dancer-actor)
- Pyjamas costume: Carlos Roda (dancer-actor)
- Children: Daniel Kone and Samuel Echardour (dancers-actors)

==== Orchestra and choir ====
- Klangforum Wien
- Coro Titular del Teatro Real

===== Instrumental soloists =====
- Percussion: Agustín Diassera
- Guitar: Cañizares

== Instrumentation ==
(as shown in the score)

- 2 Flutes (2º doubling piccolo & alto) • Oboe • 3 Clarinets (3º doubling Bass Clarinet) • Bassoon (doubling Contrabassoon) • Saxophone tenor (doubling Saxophone alto)
- 2 Horns • Trumpet • 2 Trombones (1º Trombone tenor, 2º Trombone bass) • Tuba (Tuba contrabass)
- Timpani • 2 Percussionists
- 2 Harps • Piano • Chromatic button accordion
- 4 Violins (Vl. 1º soloist) • 3 Violas • 3 Violoncellos • 1 Double bass
- Electronics

== Characters ==
(in order of appearance)

- IDIOT SHEPHERD (THIRD MAN)
- DIRECTOR (ENRIQUE)
- MANSERVANT
- FIRST WHITE HORSE (Cantaor in the first scene and third scene – second man in the third scene)
- SECOND WHITE HORSE (Cantaor in the first scene and third scene)
- THIRD WHITE HORSE (Bailaor)
- FIRST MAN (GONZALO)
- SECOND MAN
- THIRD MAN
- ELENA
- FIGURE IN BELLS (First man)
- FIGURE IN VINE LEAVES (Director)
- BOY (Juliet)
- EMPEROR
- CENTURION (Second man)
- JULIET
- BLACK HORSE (Third man)
- PIERROT COSTUME
- BALLERINA COSTUME
- PYJAMAS COSTUME (mute character)
- RED NUDE (First man)
- ENFERMERO (Manservant)
- STUDENT CHORUS
- LADIES CHOIR
- MAGICIAN (Emperor)
- LADY (Elena)

== Synopsis ==
First Scene | The Folding Screen Enrique, a theatre DIRECTOR, has just premiered a version of Romeo and Juliet. He is visited by Gonzalo, his former lover (FIRST MAN), who recriminates him for the lack of risk in his artistic design, and insists that the true theatre is that “under the sand”. Gonzalo pressures Enrique to remove his “mask” and dare to live the truth of their love, and perform the theatre he truly likes. Afraid and nervous, the Director calls ELENA, his wife, who reveals herself as a Greek statue: an ideal, but made of stone. Elena confronts Gonzalo harshly. The Director is split between his true love (Gonzalo) and social norms (Elena). A folding screen appears: the characters cross it and emerge dressed with fabulous women clothes or theatrical costumes.

Second Scene | The ruin A scene set in Roman ruins that bring back the memory of the past relationship between the Director and Gonzalo, who are presented as the Characters in Vine Leaves and in Bells, who argue, love each other, and fight. The scene also goes into the dark and violent side of sex. The EMPEROR rapes and kills a boy.

Third Scene | The Theatre under the Sand The Director stages a new version of Romeo and Juliet, this time in its form as “theatre under the sand”. The scene unfolds in Juliet's grave, underground. The fascinating character of JULIET appears the embodiment of the tensions between the bourgeois lifestyle (false, conventional and external) and another way of living that acknowledges the complete truth of the individual, including the deep, dark parts, represented by the BLACK HORSE. The climax of the Theatre under the Sand, and maybe the whole play, is the dance of the empty costumes (Pierrot, Ballerina and Pyjamas), while Juliet goes back to her grave.

Fourth Scene | The revolution In the new version of Romeo and Juliet, the Director has cast a boy as Juliet. When discovered, this sparks a revolution that seems to envelop the whole city. The choir is divided in Students (supporters of the revolution who celebrate the freedom of love) and the Ladies (who represent the bourgeois and conventional point of view, and who want to leave the theatre at all costs). A Christ painted in red appears on the bed of a hospital. When he exhales his last breath, we see that he is Gonzalo, the First Man. Gonzalo, the inspiration behind the Theatre under the Sand, ends up being a victim of the audience's fury.

Fifth Scene | The Magician Back in his office, the Director faces a MAGICIAN, an expert in trickery and swapping, whose falseness is rejected by the Director who says: “But that’s a lie, that’s theatre!”. The Director has assumed his love for Gonzalo, and has discovered that “To sleep is to sow seed”. Gonzalo's mother appears to demand the body of her dead son. The play closes with a melancholic rain of empty gloves.

== Reception ==
The opera El Público was premiered at the Teatro Real in Madrid on February 24, 2015, and had 8 performances, with the last performance taking place on February 13. King Don Felipe and Queen Doña Letizia attended this last representation, being this the first time they visited Teatro Real as Royals. The event was echoed by the national press, as it appears in the newspaper El Mundo (Spain) Los Reyes Felipe y Letizia acuden por primera vez a la ópera en el Real, as well as by the international press, as reflected for example by the magazine Paris Match . The premiere of El Público was reviewed by numerous international media, as well as by specialized critics. The eight performances hosted, according to data from the Theater, a total of 11,697 spectators with an average of 88% occupation, which can be described as a success for a production of a contemporary opera. The journalist Rubén Amón reviewed "The audience acclaims " The Public "(...) Sotelo, acclaimed as a composer of our time» The audience acclaims "The Public"
