= The Public (Chicago newspaper) =

19th century American newspaper

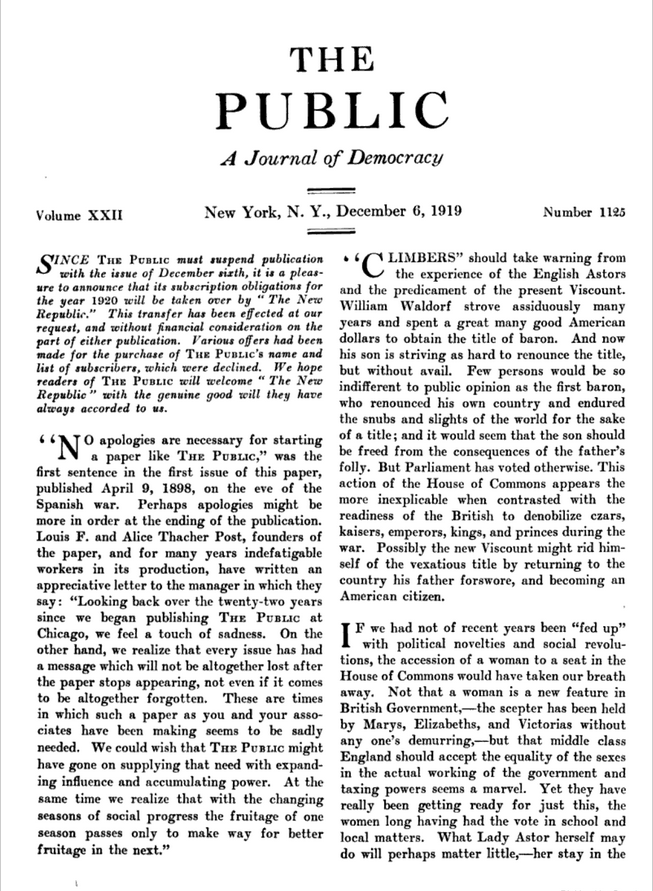
Final issue of The Public with farewell note from editors

The Public, subtitled "A National Journal of Fundamental Democracy and A Weekly Narrative of History in the Making" and later "A Journal of Democracy," was a newspaper published from 1898 to 1919.

It was established in Chicago by Louis F. Post and Alice Thatcher Post, who jointly edited the newspaper until 1913. The first issue was published April 9, 1898, on the eve of the Spanish–American War. Its offices later moved to Midtown Manhattan.

It ceased publication on December 6, 1919, turning its subscribers over to The New Republic.
