= Mauricio Sotelo =

Spanish composer

Mauricio Sotelo (born 2 October 1961 in Madrid) is a Spanish composer and conductor.

Sotelo began his musical studies as a self-taught player of the guitar, and later at the Real Conservatorio de Música de Madrid. In 1979 he moved to Vienna to study at the University of Music and Performing Arts Vienna. Four years later, after finishing his course with Dieter Kaufmann, among others, he was admitted in the Chair of Composition commanded by Francis Burt – Sotelo dedicated to him the piece De Vinculis: Ge-Burt. A Francis Burt (2001) for violin – and, decisively for him, in Roman Haubenstock-Ramati's seminars, to conclude this academic period in 1987, being awarded the Prize of Honour for graduate studies. During his time in Wien (1979–1992) Sotelo works, created (…et l'avare silence (1988), among others) and participates, together with Beat Furrer, in the creation of the Societé de l'Art acoustique, later known as Klangforum Wien. This group has to be considered a sort of "fetish" ensemble to Sotelo for two reasons: first, the personal relationship with Furrer and the musicians; second, the close and continuous work with them to create many pieces, from the Trio Basso – a R.H.R. (1988–89) to Klangmuro... I (2009) for flute, double bass and ensemble. In Vienna he also studied electroacoustic music with Dieter Kaufmann and conducting with Karl Österreicher. Also at this time, Sotelo came into contact with Luigi Nono, a composer who influenced his musical thought. He also met the poet José Ángel Valente (Orense 1929 – Geneva 2000) – an unavoidable figure to comprehend Sotelo's catalogue between 1994 and 2000—at the end of the eighties.

Already in Spain, after the première of Tenebræ Responsoria in the XXXII Semana de Música Religiosa de Cuenca (1993) with the cantaor Enrique Morente, Sotelo began teaching. As invited professor, he participated in the Aula de Música at the University of Alcalá de Henares (1993–1995), in the composition seminar at Columbia University in New York (1996), in the Summer Courses of Composition at the International Festival Órgano de León – widely known as Cursos in Villafranca del Bierzo – and, more recently, in the Seminar of Composition Casa da Musica in Oporto (2002), the Chair Manuel de Falla in Cádiz (2007) and the Course of Composition at the Conservatorio Superior de Música in Córdoba (2009).

From the turn to the 21st century, Sotelo consolidated his career in contemporary music, being institutionally recognized and finishing many main pieces like the cycle Wall of Light (2003–2007) – devoted to the figure of Sean Scully – Sonetos del amor oscuro. Cripta sonora para Luigi Nono (2003–2005) and Muerte sin fin (2010), among others.

Mauricio Sotelo has been awarded numerous prizes including the Composition Prize by the Joven Orquesta Nacional de España (1986), by the Sociedad General de Autores y Editores (1989) and by the WDR Forum Junger Komponisten (1992), the Ernst von Siemens Composer's Prize (1997), the Queen Sofia Prize of Composition (2000) and the Spanish National Music Prize (2001). He was composer in residence at the Wissenschaftskolleg zu Berlin (2011–2012) – where he had met the composer Luigi Nono at the end of the eighties. He lives in Berlin and works today as a Professor of Composition at the Escola Superior de Música de Catalunya in Barcelona.

== Creation ==
The leading influence on Sotelo's work is Venetian composer Luigi Nono. Sotelo devotes several pieces like Nel suono indicibile – a Luigi Nono (1989–1990), Due voci… come un soffio dall'estrema lontananza (1990–1991) where he uses texts from Massimo Cacciari – a philosopher deeply close to Nono – Frammenti de l'infinito. Lorca-Nono. Diálogo del amargo (1998), where the poetic figure of Federico García Lorca appears – also used by Nono in Epitaffi per Federico Garcia Lorca I–III (1951–1953) and the ballet Der rote Mantel (1955) – or Cripta. Música para Luigi Nono (2009). This biographic and musical affinity with the Italian artist produced several branches in Sotelo's composition: architecture of memory, oral tradition, act of performing, sound, Andalousian cante jondo. The attraction and analysis of all these concepts led Sotelo to a deep connection with Flamenco in all its forms: cante, guitar, percussion and baile.

=== José Ángel Valente ===
At the end of his years in Vienna, but after his return to Spain in 1992, the composer came into contact with the poet José Ángel Valente, another of the key figures in Sotelo's creation. Currently, as imbued by Valente's poetry, Sotelo writes pieces like Memoriae. Escritura interna sobre un espacio poético de José Ángel Valente (1994) – a key work in his career – Nadie (1995–97), Epitafio (1997), In pace (1997), Si después de morir... In memoriam José Ángel Valente (2000), El rayo de tiniebla (2008), Arde el alba (2008–2009) and Muros de dolor ... V: José Ángel Valente – Memoria sonora (2009).

=== Federico García Lorca ===
The figure of Federico García Lorca also appears in Sotelo's music in 1998, for the first time, when he finishes the pieces Canta la luz herida por el hielo. Homenaje a Federico García Lorca, Frammenti de l'infinito. Lorca-Nono, Diálogo del amargo and Interludien zu Lorcas 'Canciones Populares'. From that year, Lorca's lyrics arise in Sotelo's catalogue till today because of two reasons: on one side, a shared attraction for Flamenco – also a very inspiring music for the poet – and, on the other, the enchantment that Lorca's poems have caused in Luigi Nono's music already in the fifties. This seduction for the lorquian world is again reinforced in Sotelo's creative life since 2012, when he's invited to create a new opera: El público – commissioned by Gerard Mortier for the Teatro Real – in a prologue and five scenes, with a libretto by Andrés Ibáñez, after the text by Lorca published around 1930, performed for the first time in Puerto Rico in 1979 and seven years later in Spain. This opera was to have been premiered in the winter of 2015 at the Teatro Real in Madrid.

=== Sean Scully ===
As with Valente, the composer finds a closely similar thought in the abstract paintings by the Irish-born American painter Sean Scully (Dublin, 1945). Sotelo met him in 1997 in Seville, in the II International Festival of Arts Sibila.

Sotelo is largely interested in '... the process of its creation, It is certainly the clarity of the composition through which the light is liberated from material bonds and which can come to light as oscillations of air, and respectively ultimately as music'

As the composer thinks, one of the most interesting series made by the painter is the Wall of light cycle, officially launched in 1998, with Wall of light Pink, yet whose leading beginning can be located fourteen years earlier with Wall of light 4.84 (1984). The cycle continues today and remains an ongoing project in Scully's career.

Sotelo has created his own cycle of compositions devoted, at least in his conceptual aim, to Scully's work. Between 2003 and 2007, he wrote Chalan – Wall of light earth (2003), Wall of light red – für Beat Furrer (2003–2004), Sonetos del amor oscuro. Cripta Sonora para Luigi Nono (2005) –with Scully's paintings projected in the background as we shall see–, Wall of light sky (2005–2006), Wall of light black – for Sean Scully (2005–2006) and Night (2007). This is not simply a translation of art into music, but a connection between the artistic and musical disciplines. It's possible to check this from the own Sotelo's words:

...two essential characteristics of the painting of Sean Scully, which (…) are fully in accordance with my concept of sound: the formal aspect and the oscillations of color (…). In Scully's pictures the many overlapping layers of color create a deep vibrating space (…). In a certain sense, the flare of color of the various strongly luminescent layers creates a kind of 'dance'

All these poetic and artistic influences have to be understood as aæthetic keys to analyze the way in which Sotelo sees his own process of composition, but also as conceptual, textual and visual references to have in our minds when listening his music. They also take part of the score, even if they are not written in it.

== Sotelo and flamenco ==
Since 1993, Mauricio Sotelo has written a number of pieces in which flamenco has a strong presence, for two main reasons.

Sotelo began his musical studies as a child with the guitar. He later stated that the instrument is closely linked to flamenco and its associated symbolism. Throughout his career, Sotelo has demonstrated a deep knowledge of the guitar, though his approach to the instrument has evolved. Early works such as Soleá and Bulería (1984) show a less direct engagement with the instrument, while later compositions, including Como llora el viento (2007) for guitar and orchestra, reflect a more developed integration of the guitar into his oeuvre.

The second has to do with Flamenco as a way of thinking and creating music that embodies all Sotelo's compositional questions. The matter was, therefore, to go beyond the topic, to erase the boundaries and to hold a musical land where it could be possible to create a new kind of tradition, a new form of contemporary Flamenco.

Sotelo quickly understood that the cante was the key to open a wide door in Flamenco music, not only because of its aesthetic and artistic qualities but also of its technical and strictly music attributes. And the composer found them in Enrique Morente's singing. As an experienced and wise cantaor, Morente came to Sotelo's life in 1993 to participate in the premiere of Tenebrae Responsoria. Two years later, both artists work together in the piece Expulsión de la bestia triunfante (1995), premiered in the International Festival of Arts Sibila in Seville (1996). After that, Sotelo has relied on the Flamenco singers Eva Durán and Marina Heredia (to the opera De Amore. Una maschera di cenere, 1996–99), Carmen Linares (In pace, 1997), Esperanza Fernández (Nadie, 1995–1997), Miguel Poveda (Sonetos del amor oscuro, 2003–2005) and Francisco José Arcángel Ramos 'Arcángel'. With him, Sotelo has created the most of his recent pieces, from Si después de morir…, In memoriam José Ángel Valente (2000) to Muerte sin fin… comentario, a la memoria de Enrique Morente (2011), among others.

From the turn to the 21st century, Sotelo is immersed in a deep research into de timbric qualities of the cante flamenco and, specifically, that of Enrique Morente's. Being helped by the composer Fernando Villanueva (Ciudad Real, 1976) and using programmes like AudioSculpt or Sonogram, the composer has managed to extract the cante's whole physical spectrum. From this source of material, Sotelo establish a sound palette to create every piece.

This kind of creative method has led to Sotelo's music being dubbed 'spectral Flamenco', in a sort of adaptation of the French Spectral Music.

Sotelo has recently begun to introduce a flamenco female dancer in his pieces. Maybe not the first in his catalogue but the most relevant pieces with bailaora are: Muerte sin fin (2010) with cantaor and ensemble, Muerte sin fin... comentario, a la memoria de Enrique Morente, with reciter, cantaor, ensemble and electronics (2011) and Luz sobre lienzo (2011) with violin, percussion and electronics. Sotelo's efforts are directed towards creating a contemporary understanding of what flamenco means in the modern day.

In this sense, Luz sobre lienzo has to be seen maybe a main example. Only four elements: violin (truth), bailaora (history), cajón (time) and live electronics (light) –according with the programmatic reference to Goya's painting of 1812– show a more minimal work, with an intense and vivid co-participation between the Moldavian violinist Patricia Kopatchinskaja and Fuenstana 'la Moneta', who premiered this piece in Madrid.

Sotelo also calls for the 'compás' through the use of a specific rhythm or tempo in the most of his pieces from the mid-nineties, even if there's no other reference to any other form of flamenco –title, instruments, performers or poetic allusion-. Here we find how the composer has absorbed the deep conscience of what this tradition has to mean to the musician: after the years of study and the hours spent in developing the technique, flamenco –and also any kind of music or art– is a sort of inner language in which memory and experience are re-invented. The composer, in this case, is meant to make the occasion to happen, that is, to create, through the score and above all through a close work with the musicians, a new artistic milieu.

=== Alterflamenco ===
In Sotelo's hands, flamenco is no longer an exotic musical style linked to the conventional topics of the Spanish touristic image or a bourgeois approach of a strictly academic composer. Flamenco is today, with his work, an art that can be naturally integrated in the avant-garde expressions of contemporary art and music.

Many other artists have felt the attractive power of flamenco sound or, by extension, of other music traditions rooted in the memory of a specific culture. From Manuel de Falla and Béla Bartók to Klaus Huber and Toshio Hosokawa, from the music Nationalism to the postmodernist artists, we could find many examples of stylized ways to insert oral traditional musics into academic catalogues. But, which of these composers would identify himself with a popular tradition with any nationalist aim? Sotelo asserts: "I am a composer, but above all, I am a Flamenco. Here we'll have a great sound architecture with its well-sunk columns in the Flamenco roots".

To arrive to this 'manifesto', Sotelo changed his own artistic identity. After the years in Wien and the academic studies, after the art and poetry influence and his recent spectrum researches, he acts, finally, like a 'cultural nomad', as Nicolas Bourriaud has defined the artist's role in the altermodernity of today.

That's why we shall define Sotelo's music as a new form of tradition, a kind of 'alterflamenco', taking the prefix 'alter' as the sign of "an art-form exploring all dimensions of the present, tracing lines in all directions of time and space" –in Bourriaud's words–.

Sotelo's work has been published by Universal Edition since 1991.

== Works ==
=== Music for stage ===
- Rinconete y Cortadillo (2002). Ballet, for electronics. Story line by Mercedes Carrillo and Raúl Comba based on the homonymus novel by Miguel de Cervantes.
- El loco (2004). Ballet, for saxophone and orchestra.
- Muerte sin fin (2010) for dancer, cantaor and ensemble.
- Muerte sin fin... comentario, a la memoria de Enrique Morente (2011), for reciter, bailaora, cantaor, ensemble and electronics. Text by José Gorostiza.
- Luz sobre lienzo (2011) for violin, bailaora, percussion and electronics.

==== Opera ====
- De Amore, Una Maschera di Cenere (1996–1999). Chamber Opera, for ensemble, tape and live electronics. Text by Peter Mussbach.
- Dulcinea (2005–2006). A children's opera based on "Don Quijote de la Mancha" by Miguel de Cervantes. Original libretto by Andrés Ibáñez.
- El público (2011–2014). An opera in five scenes and a prologue. Libretto by Andrés Ibáñez, based on the play of the same name by Federico García Lorca commissioned by Gerard Mortier for the Teatro Real de Madrid.
- Bruno o el teatro de la memoria (1994/...). An opera in five acts. Texts by José Ángel Valente, Giordano Bruno and Mauricio Sotelo (In preparation).

=== Orchestra ===
- Música extremada (1986), for orchestra.
- Due voci…, come un soffio dall'estrema lontananza (1990/91), for clarinet, saxophone, female choir, orchestra and live-electronics.
- Tenebræ responsoria (1992/93), for cantaor, tenor saxophone, tuba, piano, double mixed choir and three orchestral groups.
- Rose in fiamme (1993/94), for piano and for orchestral groups. Revised version : Al fuego, el mar (1997/98)
- De l'infinito, universo e mondi (1996/97) for solo violin, orchestra and sound carrier.
- Frammenti de l'infinito. Lorca-Nono diálogo del amargo (1998) for orchestra and sound carrier.
- Lecturas del libro de Job (1998/2000), for flute, string orchestra (16 14 12 10 8 ) and speaker ad libitumm.
- Cena de las cenizas (1999/2000), for orchestra.
- Si después de morir… in memoriam José Ángel Valente (1999/2000), for cantaor and orchestra.
- Chalan (2003), for percussion and orchestra.
- El loco (2004), for saxophone and orchestra.
- Tamquam centrum circuli (2006), for flute, harpsichord and orchestra.
- Muros de dolor…III (2006/07), para orquesta.
- Como llora el viento… (2007), for guitar and orchestra.
- El rayo de tiniebla (2007/08), for cantaor, choir and orchestra.
- Cripta, música para Luigi Nono (2009), for voice (cantaor), mixed choir, ensemble and sound carrier.
- Arde el alba (2008/09), for soprano, 'cantaor' and orchestra.
- Cuerpos robados (2011), for violin and orchestra.

=== Chamber music ===
- Trio basso – a R.H.R (1988/89), for viola, violoncello and double bass.
- Nel suono indicibile – a Luigi Nono (1989/90), for bass-clarinet / double bass-clarinet, alto saxophone / tenor saxophone, violoncello and live-electronics.
- Chez soi sans soi (1991), for 2 flutes, sound carrier and live-electronics.
- Memoriae. Escritura interna sobre un espacio poético de José Ángel Valente (1994), for violoncello and double bass.
- Animales celestes (1995), for 1, 2, 3 or 4 violoncellos.
- De magia (1995), for alto or tenor saxophone, percussion and piano.
- Peces del aire (1999), for guitar and violoncello.
- Cábala del caballo (2000), for guitar and harpsichord.
- Como el oscuro pez del fondo (2001), for alto flute, percussion and sound carrier ad libitum.
- Degli eroici furori. Streichquartett N.1 (2002), for string quartet.
- Artemis. Streichquartett N.2 (2003/04), for string quartet.
- Audéeis (2004), for voice (flamenco-singer) and string quartet.
- Tisra. Klaviertrio N.1 (2006), for violin, violoncello and piano.
- Venta varga (2007), for violin, violoncello and piano.
- La mémoire incendiée: la guitare. Streichquartett N.3 (2007/09), for string quartet.
- Luz sobre lienzo (2011), for violin, flamenco-dancer (bailaora), percussion and electronics.
- Azul de lontananza (2012), for string sextet.
- Le temps scintille... Streichquartett N.4 (2014/...), for string quartet and electronics (In preparation).

=== Solo instruments ===
==== Piano ====
- Su un oceano di scampanellii (1994–1995) for piano. From it: Scherzo (I–II–III–VII–VIII–X) [ca. 9'] and Cadenza (V).
- Green aurora dancing over the night side of the earth (2006) for piano.
- Jerez desde el aire (2009) for piano.
- Sub rosa (2012) for piano.
- Aber das Wehende höre... (2012) for piano.
- Ancora un segreto, Hommage-Sonate per Alfred Brendel (2014), for piano.
- Encore... La joie III (2013), from Ancora un segreto, for piano.

==== Organ ====
- Supernova-Santa Marina La Real (2008) for organ.

==== Guitar ====
- El amor imposible (1996) for guitar.
- Como llora el agua (2008) for guitar.
- Encore... La joie I (2013), from Como llora el agua , for guitar.

==== Violin ====
- De vinculis: Ge-Burt. A Francis Burt (2001), for violin.
- Estremecido por el viento. Canto a Federico para violín solo (2001), for violin.
- Muros de dolor... V: José Ángel Valente-Memoria sonora (2009), for violin and live electronics.
- Encore... La joie II (2013) from Cuerpos robados (2013), for violin.

==== Violoncello ====
- De Amore (1995), for violoncello.
- Muros de dolos... VI: Soleá (2010), for violoncello.

==== Flute ====
- Trama, Il Flauto di Marsia (1996), for flute.
- Del aura al suspirar (1998), for double bass-flute (or bass-flute) and sound carrier.
- Muros de dolor... Ib (2012), for flute.
- Muros de dolor... II (2005), for flute.
- A Roberto-La chiarezza deserta (2009), for flute.

==== Clarinet ====
- Toná (2003), for clarinet.

==== Saxophone ====
- Argo (1997), for alto or tenor saxophone.

From it: Liebeslied I –parts I, II and IV– [saxophone alto]; Liebeslied II –parts VI, IX and X– [saxophone tenor] and Cantabile amoroso –parts IV and
VI– [soprano, alto or tenor saxophone]

- Muros de dolor...I (2005), for tenor saxophone.

==== Percussion ====
- De vinculis: Gong. A Nuria Schönberg (2001), for percussion.

==== Bouquet of short instrumental encores ====
- Encore… la joie I, from Como llora el agua (2013), for guitar.
- Encore… la joie IIa, from Luz Sobre Lienzo (2013), for violin.
- Encore… la joie IIb, from Luz Sobre Lienzo (2013), for violin.
- Encore… la joie III, from Ancora un segreto (2013), for piano.

==== Withdrawn works ====
Works written before 1989 have been withdrawn by the composer

- Anagrama (1986), for piano.
- … dans un ultime murmure… (1988), for marimba.
- L'Allegria (1992), for violoncello.

== Sources ==
- Mauricio Sotelo official website
- Mauricio Sotelo at Universal Edition: biography, list of works, essays, performance diary.

== Bibliography ==
- Cureses de la Vega, Marta. 'Polisemias del flamenco en la música española actual'. Música Oral del Sur, 6 (2005), 321–335.
- Fernández Guerra, Jorge. 'La trascendencia de la memoria'. Notes of the première, Sonetos del amor oscuro. Cripta sonora para Luigi Nono Granada: Festival Internacional de Música y Danza de Granada, 2005.
- Gan Quesada, Germán. Mauricio Sotelo. Música extremada, XXIV Canarias Music Festival 2008. Las Palmas de Gran Canarias: Festival de Música de Canarias, 2008, 308–347.
- Gan Quesada, Germán. 'Un jardín de voces que se bifurcan', Mauricio Soteo, De oscura llama. Madrid: INAEM-Anemos, 2009, 22.
- Gaviña, Susana & Mauricio Sotelo. 'Esta música sólo está en la mente del cantaor'. ABCD Las Artes y las Letras, ABC, 7.
- Ibáñez, Andrés. 'Mauricio Sotelo en siete piezas'. Mauricio Sotelo. De oscura llama. Madrid: INAEM-Anemos, 2009, 18–22.
- Lledó, Emilio. 'A la memoria de un poeta y de un músico, en el aire sonoro de Mauricio Sotelo', Mauricio Sotelo. Si después de morir… In memoriam José Ángel Valente. Madrid: Círculo de Lectores, 2003, 3–6.
- Marco, Tomás. 'La composición mística y la mística de la composición'. MusicadHoy Festival 2010. Madrid: s. e., 2010, 67–99.
- Moya, Enrique & Mauricio Sotelo. 'Mauricio Sotelo, la necesidad del riesgo'. Scherzo, 53, abril (1991), 111–113.
- Ordóñez Eslava, Pedro (2011). La creación musical de Mauricio Sotelo y José María Sánchez-Verdú: convergencia interdisciplinar a comienzos del siglo XXI. Granada, Universidad de Granada.
- Ordóñez Eslava, Pedro (2013). 'Walls of light and sound: Temporal and Musical Dimensions in Sean Scully's Work', Filigrane. Musique, esthétique, sciences, société. 16. Musique et Arts plastiques (2013). https://revues.mshparisnord.org/filigrane/index.php?id=591 [14 October 2014].
- Pérez Castillo, Belén. 'Sotelo Cancino, Mauricio'. Emilio Casares (dir.). Diccionario de la Música Española e Hispanoamericana. Madrid: Sociedad General de Autores y Editores, 1999–2001, vol. VII., 36–39.
- Pérez Frutos, Iluminada. 'Tratamiento de la voz. Tradición oral en la obra de Mauricio Sotelo'. Papeles del Festival de Música Española de Cádiz, 3 (2007), 139–160.
- Sotelo, Mauricio & José Luis Ortiz Nuevo. 'Conversaciones'. Seminar 'Flamenco, un arte popular moderno', Universidad Internacional de Andalucía, 2004. : http://ayp.unia.es/index.php?option=com_content&task=view&id=336 [13 October 2014]
- Sotelo, Mauricio et al. De amore, una maschera di Cenere, libretto by Peter Mussbach, music by Mauricio Sotelo, Madrid, Teatro de la Zarzuela, 1999.
- Sotelo, Mauricio. 'El espacio de la escucha'. Revista de Arte, Música y Literatura Sibila, 6 (1997), 49–51.
- Sotelo, Mauricio. 'Luigi Nono o el dominio de los infiniti possibili'. Quodlibet, 7 (1997), 22–31.
- Sotelo, Mauricio. 'Memoriæ', Cuadernos de la Huerta de San Vicente, 1 (2001), 52–59.
- Sotelo, Mauricio. 'Se oye tan solo una infinita escucha', Si después de morir… In memoriam José Ángel Valente. Madrid: Círculo de Lectores, 2003, 9–11.
- Sotelo, Mauricio. 'Sonetos del amor oscuro Cripta sonora para Luigi Nono', LIV Festival Internacional de Música y Danza de Granada. Granada: Festival Internacional de Música y Danza de Granada, 2005, 8.
- Vela del Campo, Juan Ángel. 'Con pellizco', El País, 3 July 2005. https://www.elpais.com/articulo/espectaculos/pellizco/elpepiesp/20050703elpepiesp_6/Tes [13 October 2014]
