= Teatro Real =

Opera house in Madrid, Spain

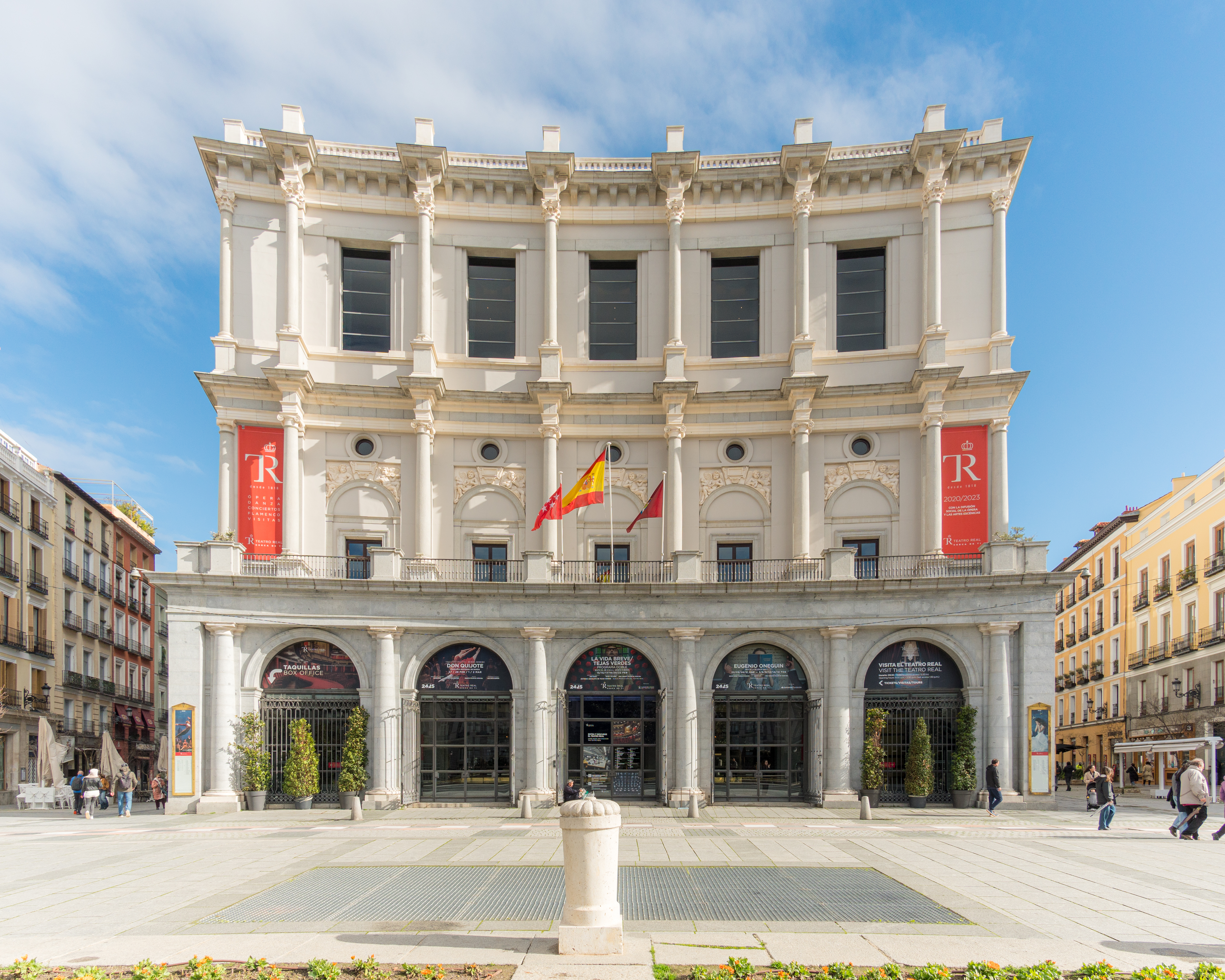
- Main façade towards Plaza de Oriente
- Interactive map of Teatro Real
- Location: Madrid, Spain
- Coordinates: 40°25′06″N 3°42′37″W
- Operator: Fundación del Teatro Real
- Capacity: 1,958 seats
- Type: Theatre
- Event: Opera
- Public transit: Ópera

Construction
- Groundbreaking: 23 April 1818
- Built: 1818–1850
- Opened: 19 November 1850
- Reopened: 11 October 1997
- Rebuilt: 1991–1997
- Architects: Antonio López Aguado; Custodio Moreno; Renovation: Jaime González Varcárcel; Miguel Verdú Belmonte; Francisco R. Partearroyo

Spanish Cultural Heritage
- Type: Non-movable
- Criteria: Monument
- Designated: 30 June 1993
- Reference no.: RI-51-0008289

The Teatro Real (English: Royal Theatre or Royal Opera House) is an opera house in Madrid, Spain. Located at the Plaza de Oriente, opposite the Royal Palace, and known colloquially as "El Real" (The Royal One). it is considered the top institution of the performing and musical arts in the country and one of the most prestigious opera houses in Europe.

The groundbreaking of the Teatro Real was on 23 April 1818, under the reign of King Ferdinand VII, and it was formally opened by his daughter Queen Isabella II on 19 November 1850. It closed in 1925 due to damage to the building and reopened on 13 October 1966 as a symphonic music venue. Beginning in 1991, it underwent major refurbishment and renovation works and finally reopened as an opera house on 11 October 1997. It has a floor area of 78,210 square metres (841,800 sq ft) and a maximum capacity of 1,958 seats.

Since 1995, the theatre is managed by a public foundation in whose Board of Trustees are represented the Ministry of Culture of the Government of Spain, the Government of the Community of Madrid and the City Council of Madrid. Since 1998, its principal orchestra is the Orquesta Sinfónica de Madrid.

In addition to its regular annual program of opera, dance, concerts and recitals, the theatre has hosted other special events throughout its history, such as the 14th Eurovision Song Contest in 1969, the 25th Goya Awards in 2011 or the Lotería Nacional's Christmas special draw since 2012. Teatro Real received the "Opera Company of the Year" award at the 2020/21 and 2026 International Opera Awards. The building is listed as a Bien de Interés Cultural since 1993.

== History ==
=== Background ===
The former Teatro de los Caños del Peral was a theatre, built over an earlier corral de comedias, and opened in 1738 under the reign of King Philip V. It got its name from the nearby Fountain of the Pear Tree Canals. The theatre was demolished in 1817 to clear the space for the current Teatro Real.

=== Early years ===
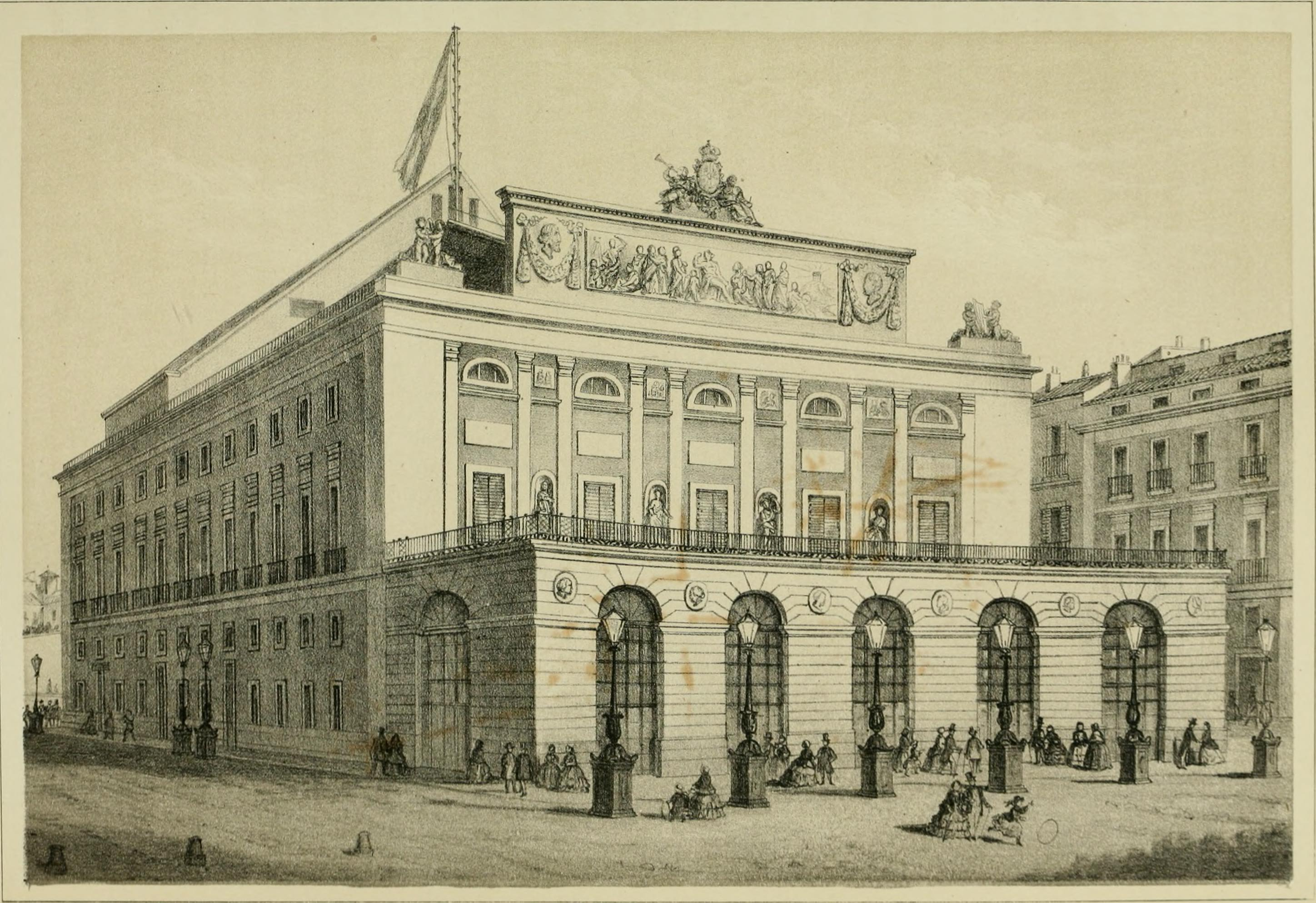
Teatro Real in 1860

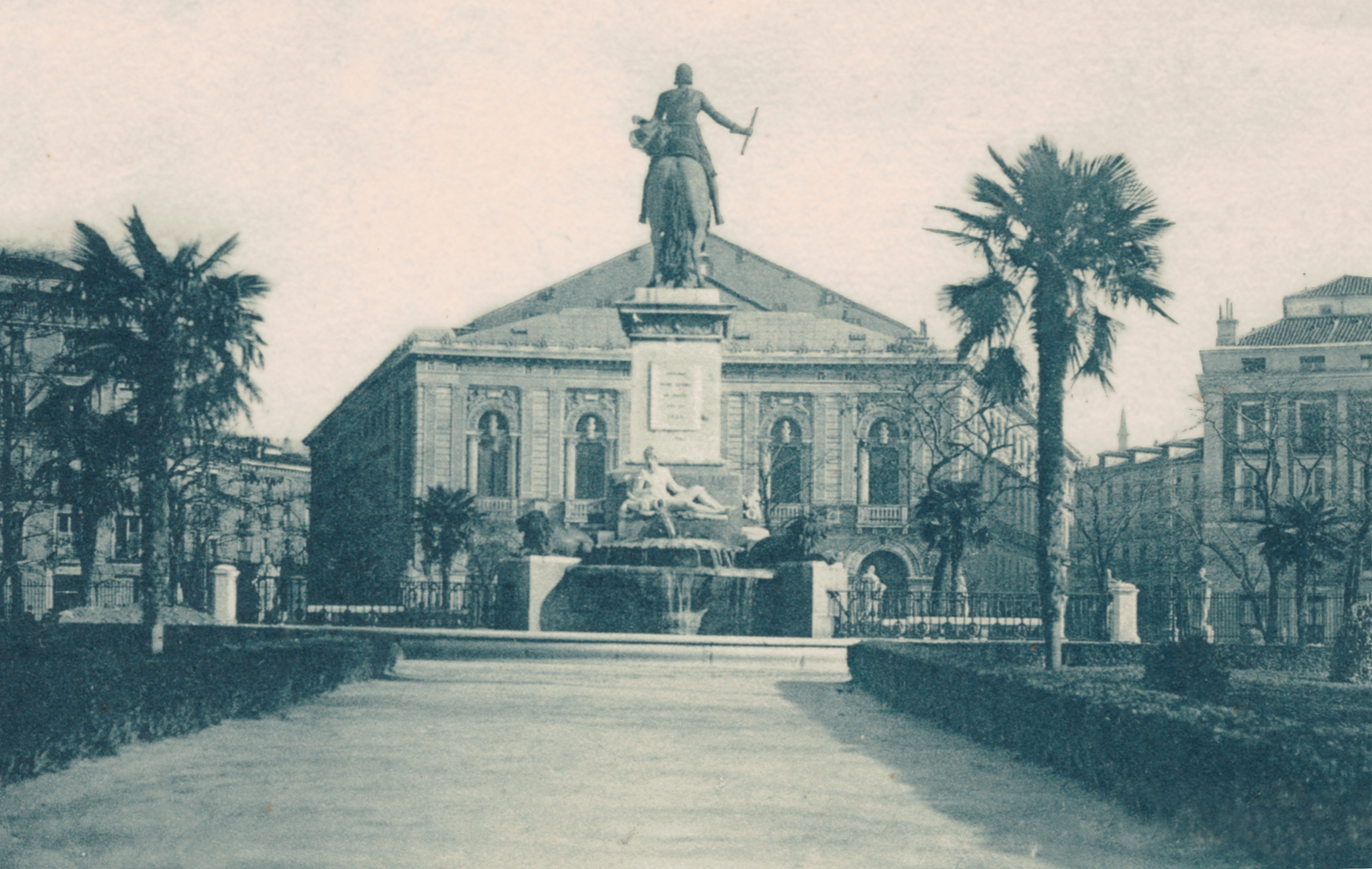
The theatre in the 1900s

The current theatre was founded by King Ferdinand VII in 1818, and after thirty-two years of planning and construction, a Royal Order on 7 May 1850, decreed the immediate completion of the "Teatro de Oriente" and the building works were finished within five months. The opera house, located just opposite the Palacio Real, the official residence of the royal family, was finally inaugurated by Queen Isabella II on 19 November 1850, attending the performance of Donizetti's La favorite.

Madrid Opera soon became one of the most prestigious opera houses in Europe. For over five decades it hosted the most renowned singers and composers of the time. In the early period, it saw famous opera singers such as Alboni, Frezzolini, Marietta Gazzaniga, Rosina Penco, Giulia Grisi, Giorgio Ronconi, Italo Gardoni, Mario de Candia and Antonio Selva among many others. In 1863, Giuseppe Verdi visited the theatre for the Spanish premiere of his La forza del destino. At its peak, in the last quarter of the 19th century, the Teatro hosted world renowned artists such as Adelaide Borghi, Marie Sasse, Adelina Patti, Christina Nilsson, Luisa Tetrazzini, Mattia Battistini, Julián Gayarre, Angelo Masini, Francesco Tamagno and Enrico Tamberlick. In 1917, the Ballets Russes of Diaghilev performed in the theatre with the presence of Nijinsky and Stravinsky.

=== As a concert hall ===
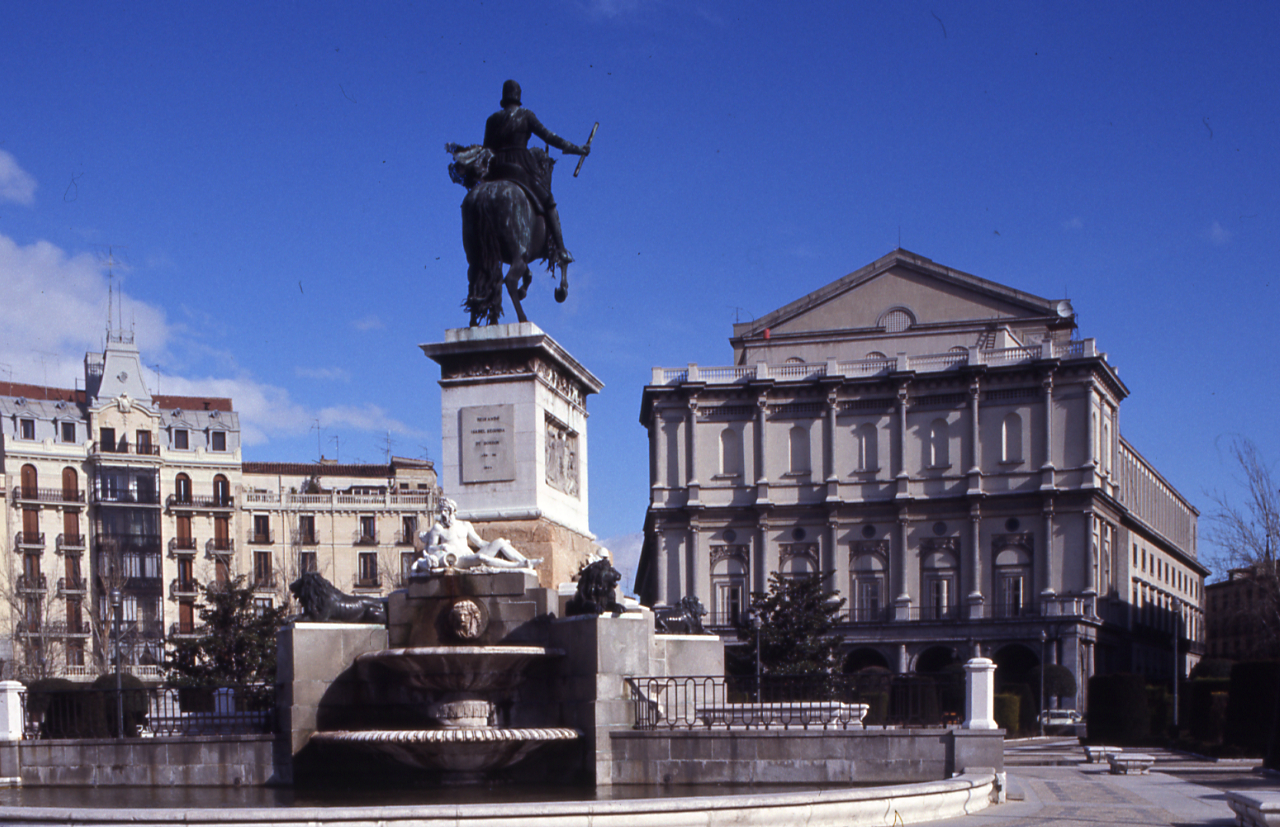
Teatro Real in 1980

In December 1925 a Royal Order ordered its activities to be discontinued owing to the damage that the construction of the Metro de Madrid had caused to the building. The government set out to restore it and ordered numerous projects to be drawn out for its renovation, such as that from architect Antonio Flórez Urdapilleta, who proposed a monumental remodeling of the building. However, the Civil War and the post-war financial difficulties prevented the completion of these projects and led to a simple restoration, sponsored by the Juan March Institute, and carried out first by the architect Manuel Gonzalez Valcárcel, and later by architects Miguel Verdú Belmonte and Francisco Rodriguez Partearroyo.

The theatre reopened on 13 October 1966 as a concert hall as well as the main concert venue for the Spanish National Orchestra and the RTVE Symphony Orchestra. The reopening was celebrated with a concert of the Spanish National Orchestra, conducted by Rafael Frühbeck de Burgos, in which it was performed Beethoven's Symphony No. 9 –together with the Orfeón Donostiarra– and Manuel de Falla's Homenajes. The venue closed for renovations with a last concert by the Spanish National Orchestra on 13 October 1988.

From 1867 to 1925 and from 1966 to 1990, the Royal Opera also housed the Madrid Royal Conservatory and the Royal Higher College of Performing Arts.

=== Remodeling ===
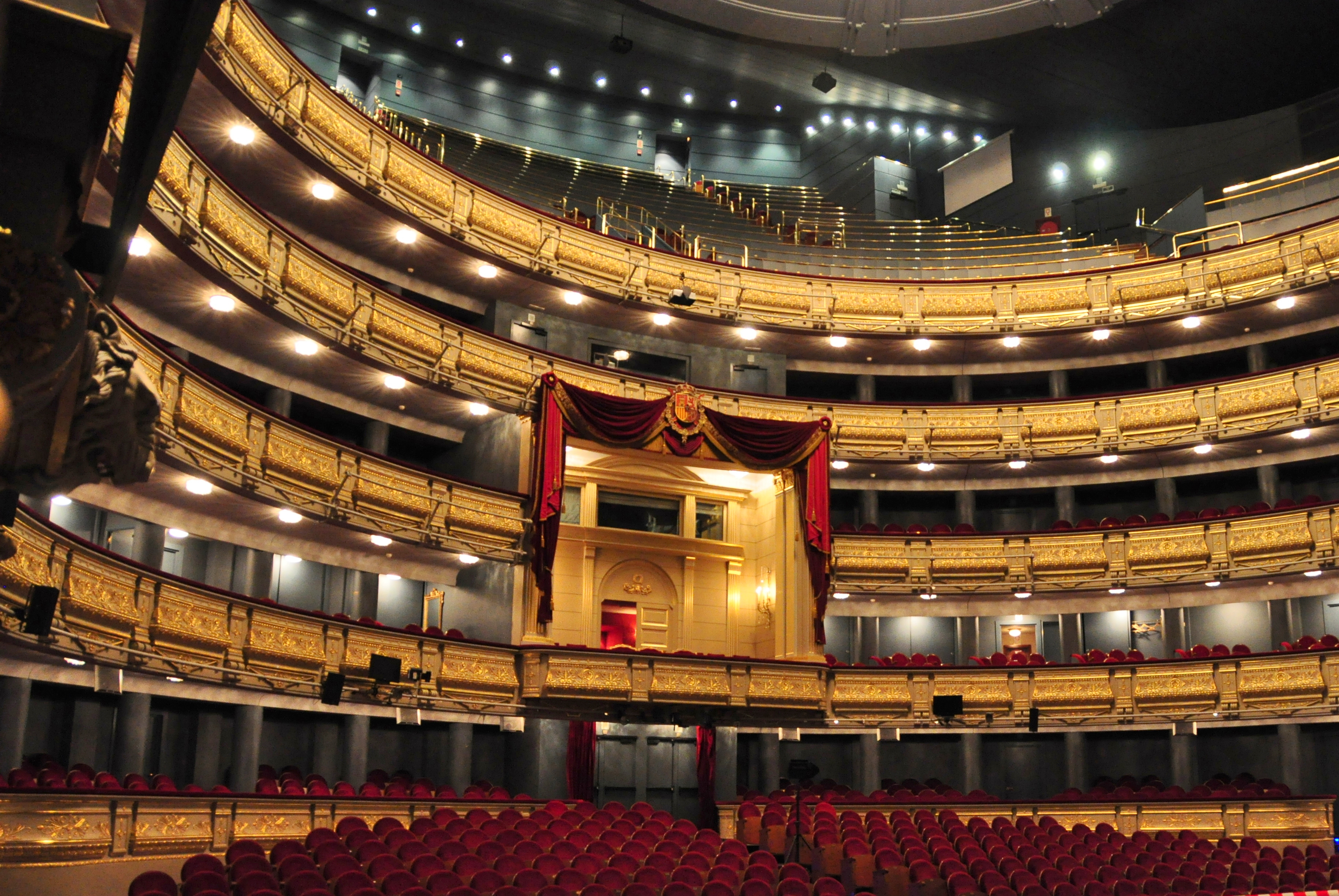
The auditorium with the royal box in the center. (2013)

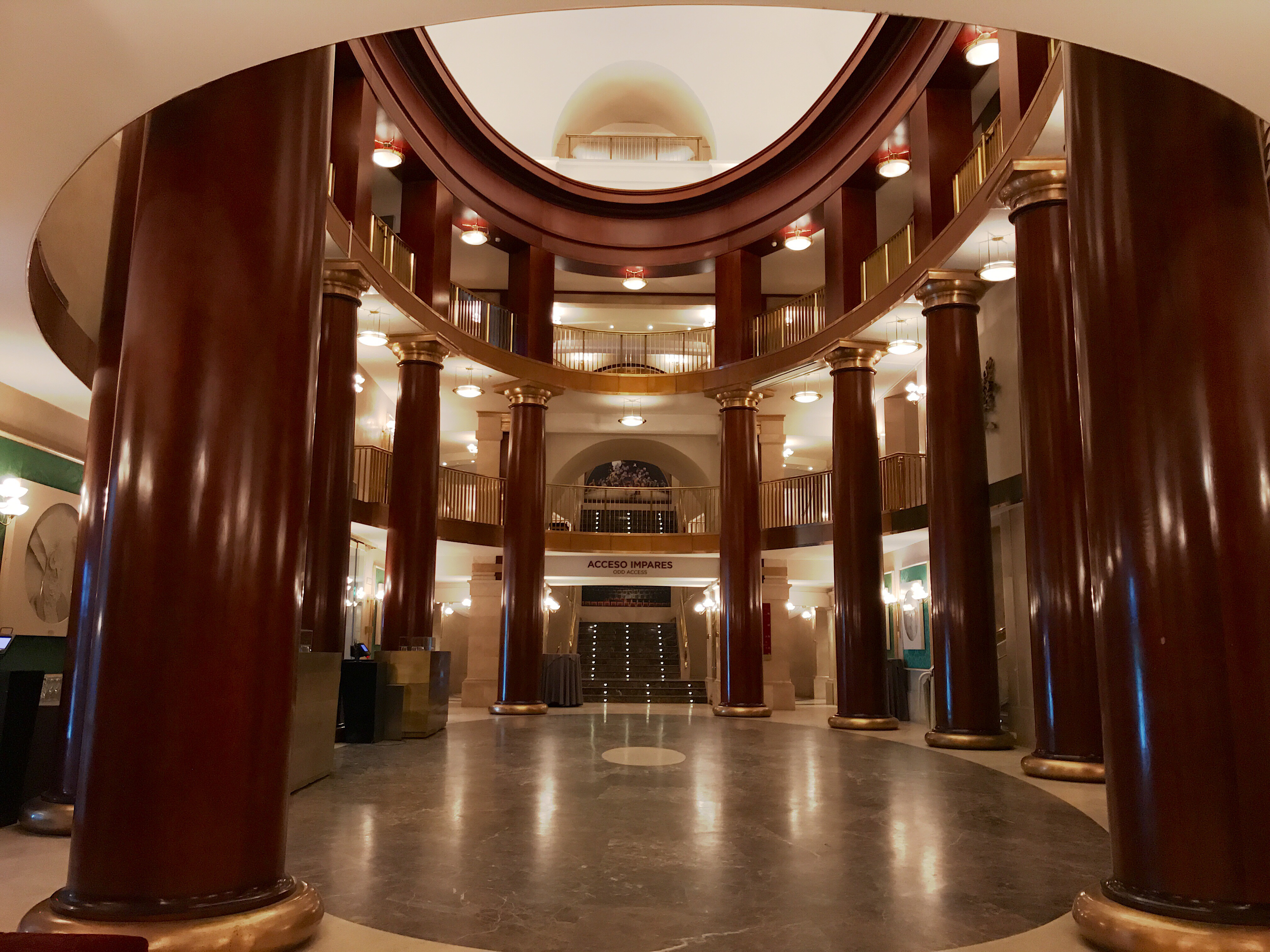
Lobby

Starting on 2 January 1991, the house was remodeled to host opera again. The building was completed in late 1995, then the process of technical, administrative, artistic and functional organization began which led to the opening of the theatre by King Juan Carlos I and Queen Sofía on 11 October 1997. The opera program performed at the reopening was El sombrero de tres picos and La vida breve by Manuel de Falla, which was immediately followed by the world premiere of the opera Divinas Palabras by Antón García Abril –actually commissioned to open the house– with Plácido Domingo in the cast.

The remodeling was based on the old classical style of opera house with only basic modernization leaving many seats without a view of the stage. A considerable percentage of seats have a limited or zero view of the stage and a live stream of operas and ballets is projected on the upper side walls of the house so that the entire audience can follow the performance regardless of their view of the stage. The theatre has a floor area of 78,210 square metres (841,800 sq ft), with a stage of 1,430 square metres (15,400 sq ft) and a maximum capacity, depending on the orchestra pit, of 1,958 seats.

== Productions ==
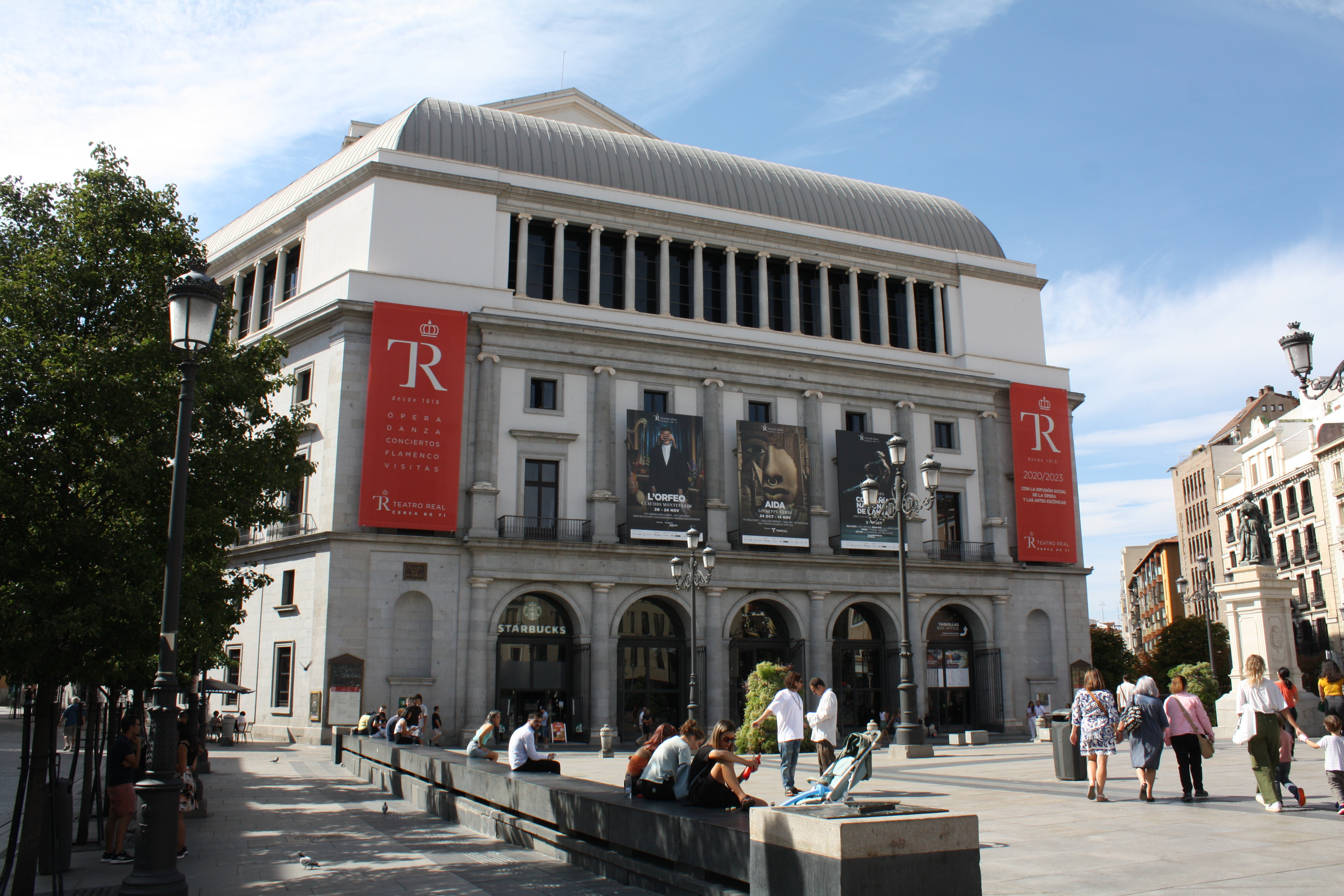
The Royal Opera of Madrid from the east at the Plaza de Isabel II—the back side of the theatre (2022)

The theatre stages around seventeen opera titles and two or three major ballets per annual season, from September to July, both own productions or co-productions with other major opera houses abroad, as well as concerts and recitals.

The most popular operas at the Teatro Real have included Verdi's Rigoletto with 409 performances, followed by Aida with 378 and Il trovatore with 356. Two works by Meyerbeer L'Africaine –with 268– and Les Huguenots –with 243– have been shown to draw audiences, although the former work has not been performed since the 1920s, being no longer considered mainstream repertory. Donizetti's Lucrezia Borgia has been given some 218 performances since its debut in the house in 1919.

=== World premieres ===
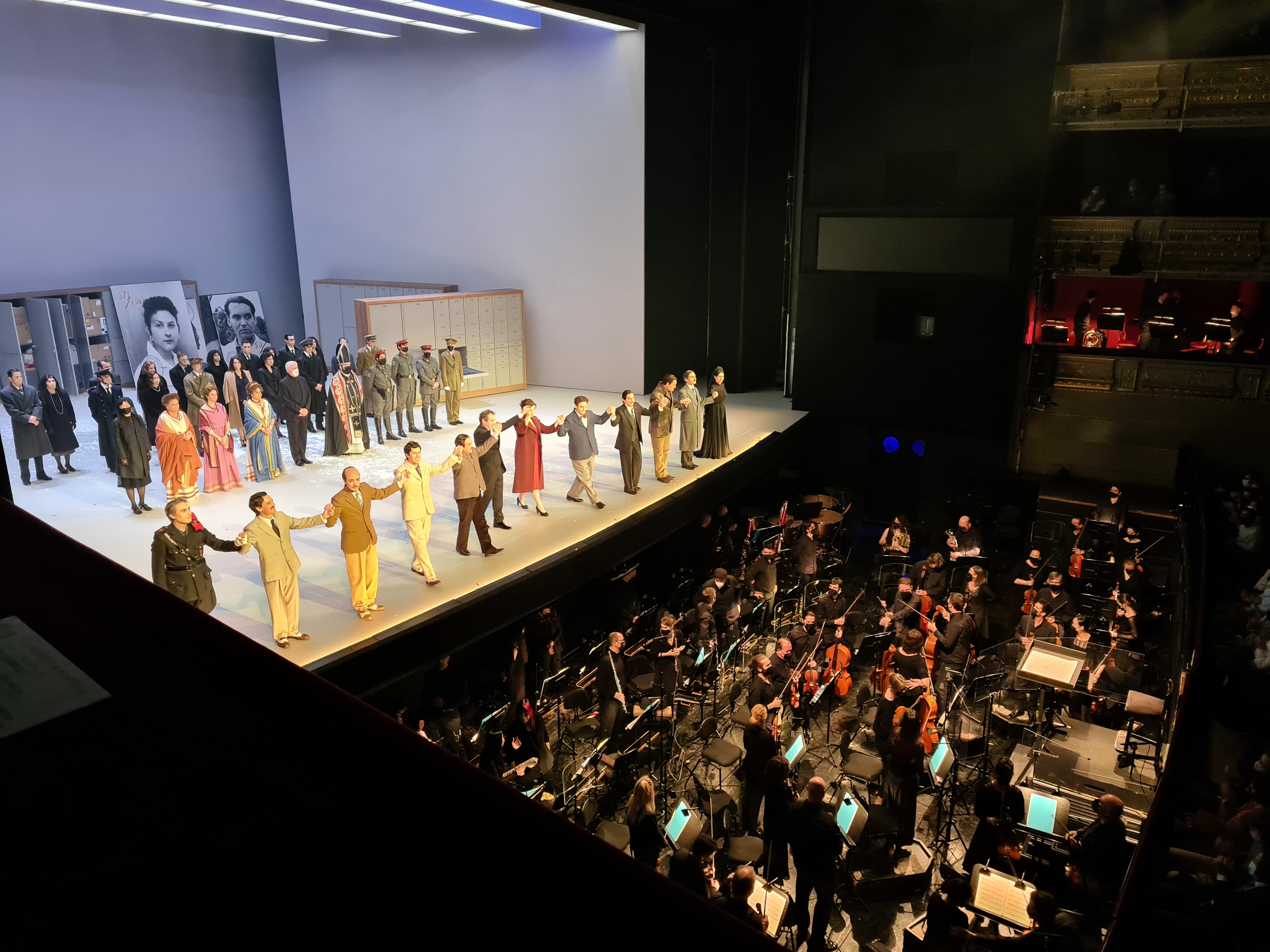
Premiere of the opera El abrecartas (2022) by Luis de Pablo

In addition of the world premiere of Divinas Palabras by Antón García Abril, the Royal Opera has staged another sixteen world opera premieres since its reopening: Don Quijote by Cristóbal Halffter (2000), La señorita Cristina by Luis de Pablo (2001), Dulcinea by Mauricio Sotelo (2006), El viaje a Simorgh by José María Sánchez-Verdú (2007), Faust-Bal by Leonardo Balada (2009), La página en blanco by Pilar Jurado (2011), The Perfect American by Philip Glass (2013), Brokeback Mountain by Charles Wuorinen (2014), The Public by Mauricio Sotelo (2015), La ciudad de las mentiras by Elena Mendoza (2017), El Pintor by Juan J. Colomer (2018), Je suis narcissiste by Raquel García-Tomás (2019), Marie by Germán Alonso (2020), Tránsito by Jesús Torres (2021), El abrecartas by Luis de Pablo (2022) and Extinción by Señor Serrano Group (2022).

The company also premiered the first complete staging, with sets and scenography, of Isaac Albéniz's Merlin in 2003 –101 years after its completion–, the first modern revival of Vicente Martín y Soler's Il burbero di buon cuore in 2007 and Poppea e Nerone, a new orchestration for a modern chamber orchestra of Claudio Monteverdi's L'incoronazione di Poppea, by Philippe Boesmans in 2012.

=== Bicentenary ===
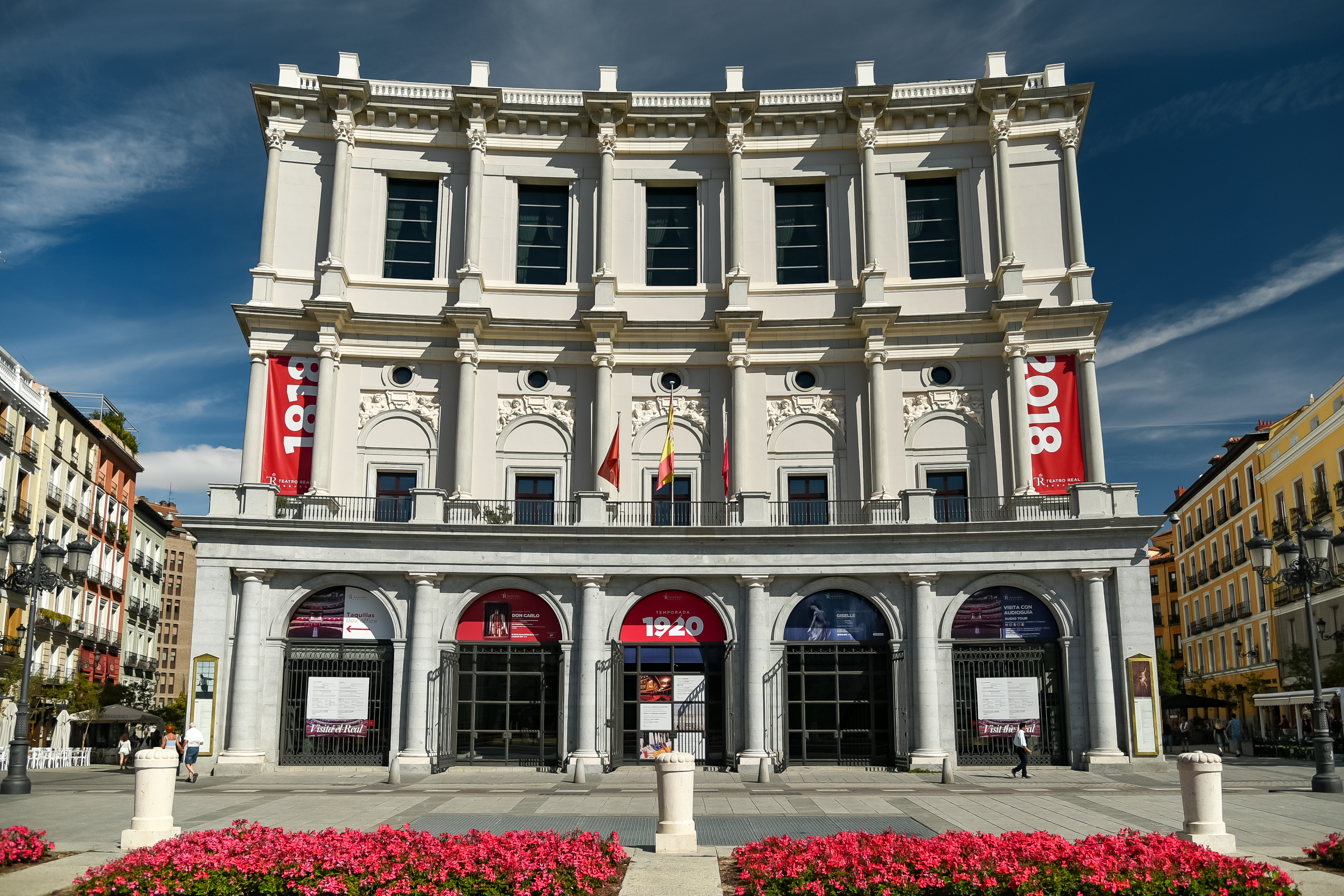
Main façade.

The Teatro Real celebrated its bicentenary with a special programme from 2016 through 2018. One of the operas featured was Bellini's I puritani, a co-production with the Teatro Municipal of Santiago, Chile. A performance of this work was streamed in July 2016 via the Royal Opera's Facebook page, an example of the theatre extending its reach by digital services. The event was also relayed to a number of venues and was a national trending topic on Twitter. The same production has been performed by the company –including orchestra and chorus– in August 2017 at the Savonlinna Opera Festival.

== Company ==
Since 1998, the resident ensemble of the Teatro Real is the Orquesta Sinfónica de Madrid. The current artistic manager is Joan Matabosch, former director of Gran Teatre del Liceu in Barcelona. The current music director of the company is Ivor Bolton, since 2015. The current principal guest conductors are Pablo Heras-Casado and Nicola Luisotti. Bolton is scheduled to stand down as music director at the close of the 2024–25 season. In July 2022, the company announced the appointment of Gustavo Gimeno as its next music director, effective with the 2025–26 season, with an initial contract of five years.

=== Artistic directors (partial list) ===
- Stéphane Lissner (1995–1997)
- Luis Antonio García Navarro (1997–2001, artistic and music director)
- Emilio Sagi (2001–2005)
- Antonio Moral (2005–2010)
- Gerard Mortier (2010–2013) (artistic advisor from 2014)
- Joan Matabosch (2014–present)

=== Music directors (partial list) ===
- Luis Antonio García Navarro (1997–2001, artistic and music director)
- Jesús López Cobos (2003–2010)
- Ivor Bolton (2015–2025)
- Gustavo Gimeno (2025–present)

== Accolades ==
=== International Opera Awards ===
Year	Category	Work / Laureate	Result	R.
2018	Opera Company	Teatro Real	Nominated	
2018	New Production	Britten: Billy Budd, d. Deborah Warner (Teatro Real)	Won	
2018	Chorus	Teatro Real	Nominated	
2018	Rediscovered Work	Ginastera: Bomarzo (Teatro Real)	Nominated	
2019	New Production	Britten: Gloriana, d. David McVicar (Teatro Real)	Nominated	
2020/21	Opera Company	Teatro Real	Won	
2020/21	Opera Orchestra	Teatro Real	Nominated	
2020/21	World Premiere	García-Tomás: Je suis narcissiste (Teatro Real)	Nominated	
2022	Recording (Complete Opera)	Dvořák: Rusalka (Teatro Real/C Major)	Nominated	
2023	New Production	Rossini: Il turco in Italia (Teatro Real/Pelly)	Nominated	
2023	Rediscovered Work	Corselli: Achille in Sciro (Teatro Real)	Nominated	
2024	New Production	Wagner: Die Meistersinger von Nürnberg (Teatro Real/Pelly)	Nominated	
2024	World Premiere	Manchado: La Regenta (Teatro Real)	Nominated	
2025	New Production	Janáček: The Excursions of Mr. Brouček (National Theatre Brno & Staatsoper Berlin/Teatro Real/Robert Carsen)	Won	
2025	Sustainability	Teatro Real	Won	
2025	World Premiere	Cánovas/Iglesias: Don Juan no existe (Festival Perelada/Teatro de la Maestranza/Teatros del Canal/Teatro Real/Liceu)	Nominated	
2026	Opera Company	Teatro Real	Won	
2026	Equal Opportunities	Teatro Real – Agrupación Musical Inclusiva	Nominated	
2026	New Production	Britten: A Midsummer Night’s Dream (Teatro Real/The Royal Ballet and Opera/Maggio Musicale Fiorentino/Deborah Warner)	Nominated	
2026	World Premiere	Coll/Rigola: Enemigo del pueblo (Palau de les Arts/Teatro Real)	Nominated	

== Special Events ==
The Teatro Real has hosted some special events throughout its history. On 29 March 1969, Televisión Española held the 14th Eurovision Song Contest at the theatre, featuring an onstage metal sculpture created by surrealist Spanish artist Amadeo Gabino. On 13 February 2011, the Academy of Cinematographic Arts and Sciences of Spain held the 25th Goya Awards ceremony at the theatre. Every 22 December since 2012, Loterías y Apuestas del Estado holds its Lotería Nacional's Christmas special draw there. On 28 November 2022, the International Opera Awards 2022 ceremony was held at the theatre.

== Tours of the building ==
The Opera House offers daily different types of guided tours, lasting between 50 and 90 minutes and given in various languages. This gives the public the opportunity to learn about the building, including the stage area, the workshops and the rehearsal spaces.

== Controversies ==
=== Cancellation of Shen Yun ===
In 2019 Teatro Real scheduled several performances of a show by the American dance company, Shen Yun Performing Arts. The theatre sold 900 tickets for the performances, but canceled the event. The Royal Opera claimed technical problems, but the then Chinese ambassador to Madrid Lü Fan said in a recording that it had been he who had pressured and given directions to the theatre to cancel the performance.

=== COVID-19 measures ===
In 2020 the theatre cancelled a performance of the opera Un ballo in maschera amidst booing from the audience due to lack of safety distance in the roost. Several attendees complained about the relocation of some audience members in the gods' seats and the overcrowding of audience members with respect to the rest of the areas. The police later verified that the capacity was adequate for the restrictions imposed by COVID-19. The theatre claimed that less than 50 percent of the tickets had been sold.

== See also ==
- Madrid Symphony Orchestra
- Spanish National Orchestra
- RTVE Symphony Orchestra
- Community of Madrid Orchestra
- Queen Sofía Chamber Orchestra
- National Auditorium of Music
- Teatro Monumental
- Zarzuela

Preceded by Royal Albert Hall; London	Eurovision Song Contest; Venue; 1969	Succeeded by RAI Congrescentrum; Amsterdam
