= Public (band) =

American pop rock band

- Origin: Cincinnati, Ohio, U.S.
- Genres: Pop rock; indie pop; alternative rock
- Years active: 2012–present
- Labels: Island Records; Crown Music
- Members: John Vaughn; Matt Alvarado; Ben Lapps

Public (stylized as PUBLIC) is an American pop rock band from Cincinnati, Ohio, formed in 2012. The band consists of John Vaughn (vocals/guitars), Matt Alvarado (bass), and Ben Lapps (drums).

The band gained recognition with their single "Make You Mine", originally released in 2014. The song experienced renewed popularity in 2019 after becoming viral on TikTok. Following the song's success, they signed with Island Records. The band has toured with artists including Walk the Moon, Twenty One Pilots, AJR, Jesse McCartney, Young the Giant and The Driver Era.

== History ==
=== Early career ===
John Vaughn, Matthew Alvarado and Ben Lapps met while attending high school in Cincinnati, where they performed together in the school's jazz orchestra. Vaughn and Lapps had known each other since grade school and bonded over classic rock music, particularly Led Zeppelin. The members later developed influences from artists such as Red Hot Chili Peppers and Muse, while organizing jam sessions and writing music together.

In 2011, Public participated in a local battle of the bands competition, winning the event and attracting the attention of an artist development representative. The group subsequently recorded their debut EP Red. Public officially launched in 2012 with the release of the extended play. After establishing a following in Cincinnati, the band began touring nationally and opened for fellow Ohio group Walk the Moon during promotion for their single "Shut Up and Dance". Public later supported artists including Twenty One Pilots, Jesse McCartney, Young the Giant, AJR, and The Driver Era.

The group's performances became known for energetic stage presence and audience interaction. During a 2020 performance in Portland while opening for American Authors and Magic Giant, the band drew attention for its energetic stage presence and interaction with the audience.

=== Make You Mine ===
Public released "Make You Mine" in 2014. The song was written by Vaughn while attending a piano class in college after creating the main melody during a scale exercise. Vaughn described the song as focusing on small moments in relationships and emotional intimacy rather than themes commonly emphasized in modern pop songs.

Several years after release, the song experienced renewed popularity after becoming widely used on TikTok. More than one million videos used the track during its viral rise on the platform. The trend later became known as the "Make You Mine Challenge". The song also inspired various non-romantic videos, including animal and tribute content shared by users.

In 2019, Public signed with Island Records and released a three-track Make You Mine bundle, including an acoustic version of the song. The band stated that the single represented themes of innocence, romance and meaningful personal connection.

=== Later projects ===
In December 2020, Public released the single "Splash". The music video, directed by Santiago Salviche, portrayed the band as fictional robbers known as the "Sundrop Bandits". The track was later featured in the premiere episode of the Snap original series Move It!.

== Members ==
- John Vaughn – lead vocals, guitar
- Matthew Carter Alvarado – bass, synthesizers, backing vocals
- Ben Lapps – percussion, drums

== Discography ==
=== EPs ===
- Red (2012)
- Let's Remake It (2015)
- Sweet Lemonade (2017)
- Three Hearts (2022)

=== Singles ===
- "Make You Mine" (2014)
- "One That I One" (2018)
- "Honey In the Summer" (2020)
- "Splash" (2020)
- "Missing You Today" (2021)
- "Stay" (2022)
