= Monreale Cathedral mosaics =

Mosaics at Monreale Cathedral in Sicily

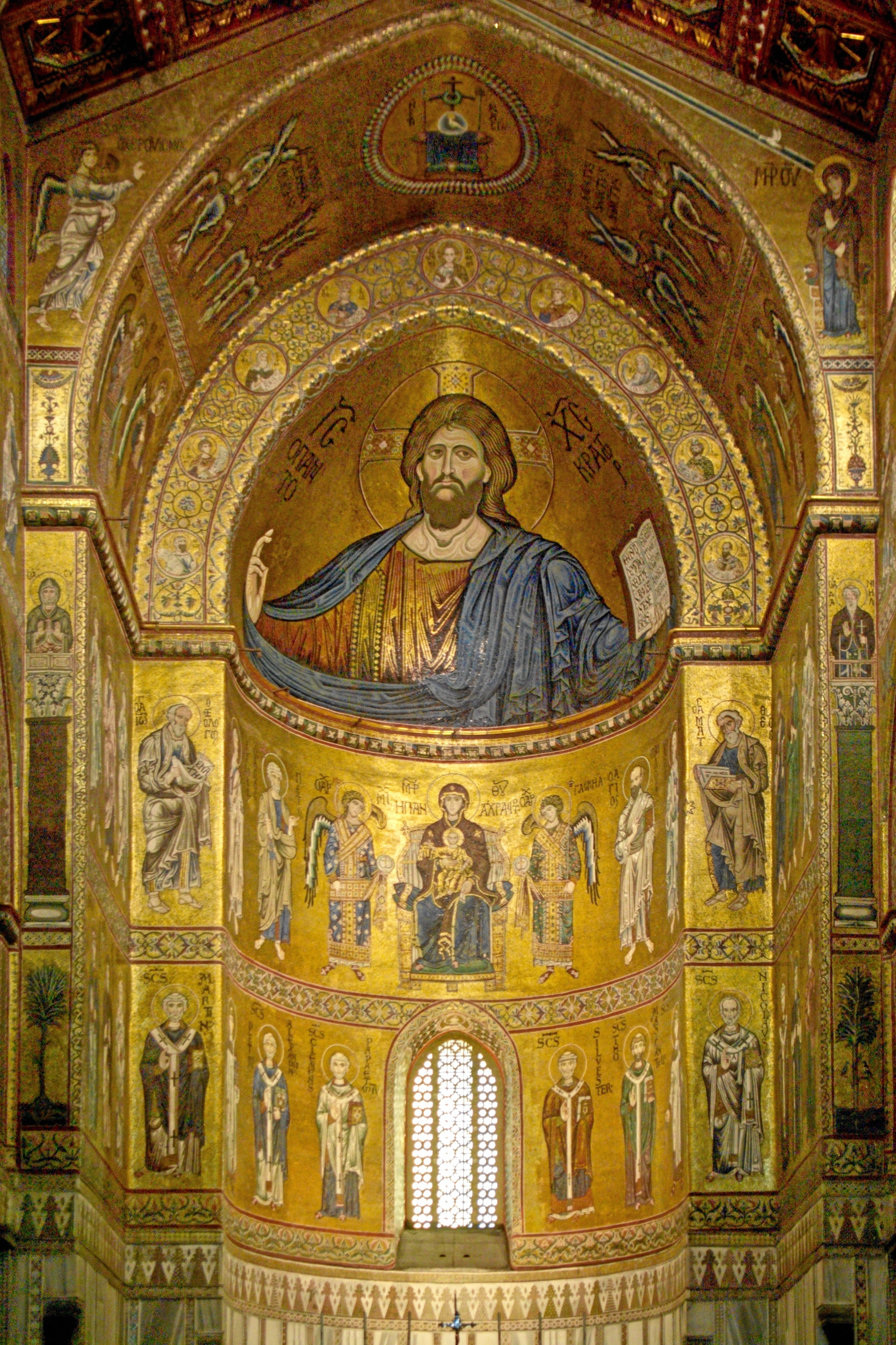
East Apse featuring the central image of Christ Pantocrator

The Monreale Cathedral Mosaics are the main internal feature of Monreale Cathedral in the city of Palermo, Sicily, Italy; the mosaics cover 6,500 m^{2}. The mosaics are made up of glass tesserae in the Byzantine style at the orders of William II of Sicily.

The main attraction of Monreale Cathedral is its 130 mosaics, which cover almost all the interior walls of the cathedral. In terms of area and conceptual integrity, the Monreale mosaics are one of the largest mosaic cycles in the world. Most of the mosaics were completed in a record short period between 1183 and 1189.

The cathedral was then erected in a royal park on the site of an earlier Greek church. However, work on the structure as well as its decoration was, for the most part, completed following the death of the king in 1189. The cathedral was then later consecrated to the Assumption of the Virgin.

== Style ==
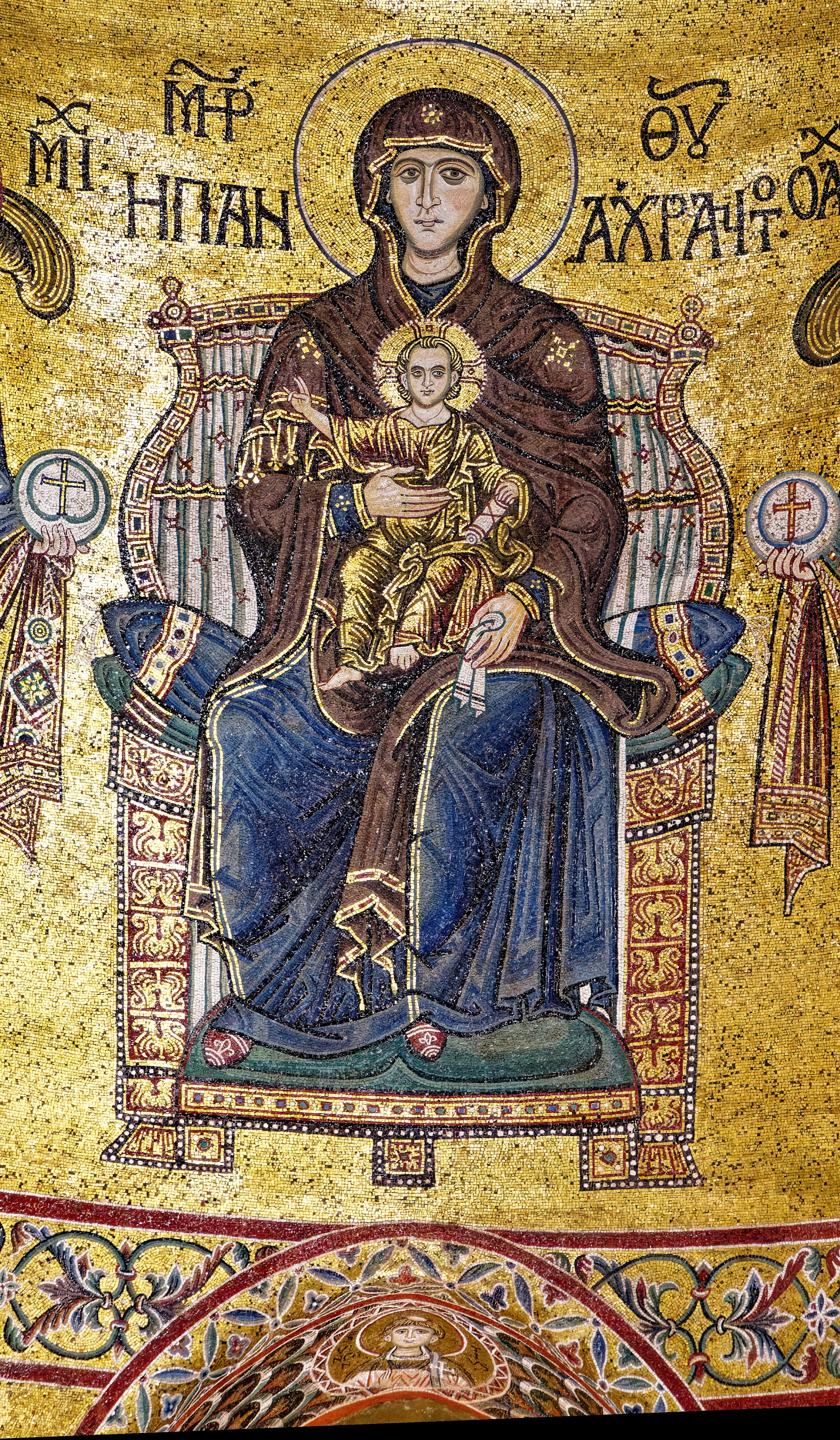
Virgin mosaic from the apse

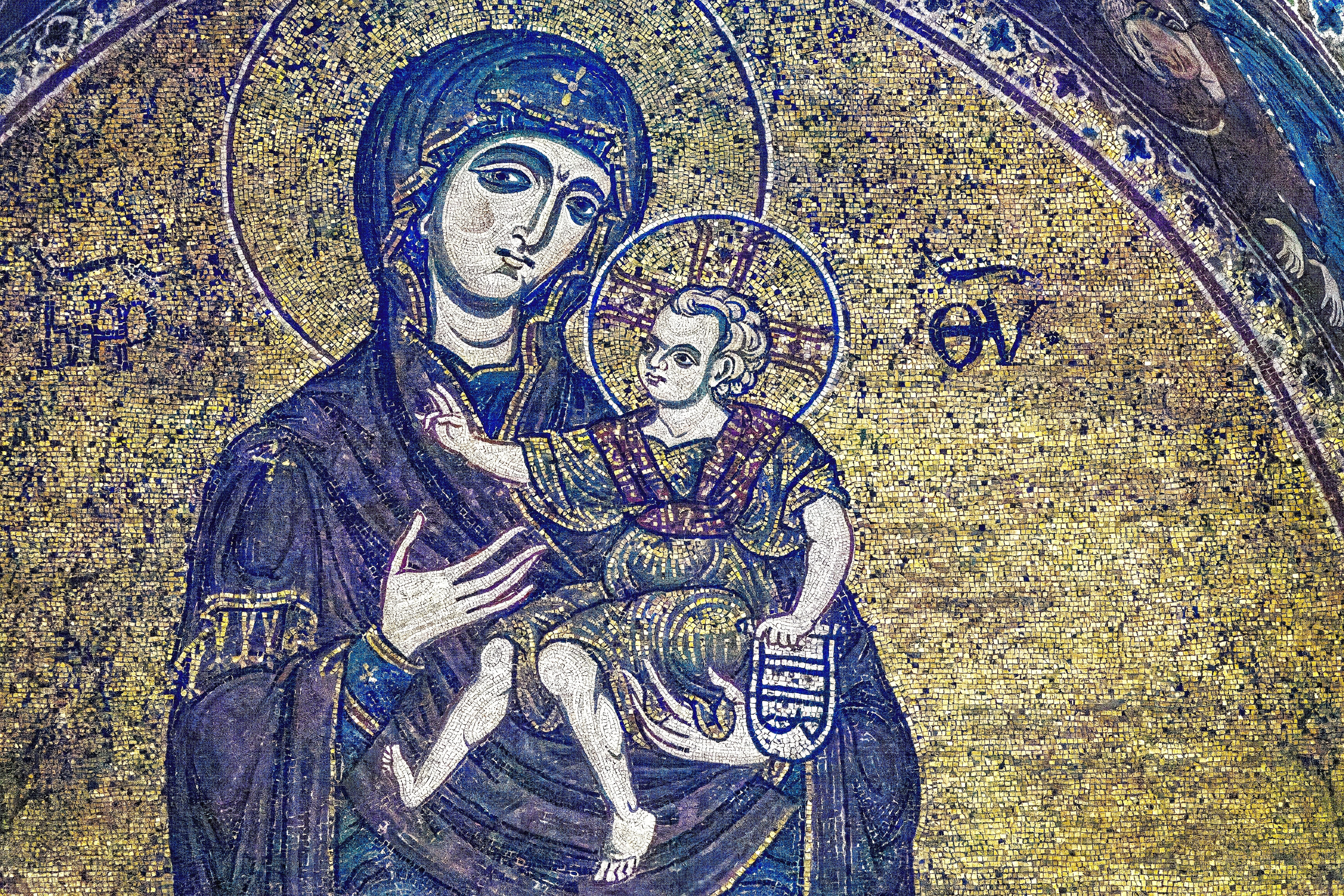
Virgin mosaic from the nave

The names of the mosaic artists are unknown, and their national origin is disputed. The artists could have been masters invited from Constantinople, or local masters influenced by Byzantine art.

The "Constantinopolitan" version is supported by the typically Greek attire of Christ, the Mother of God, and the archangels, and Greek inscriptions on a number of mosaics in the apse. The "local" version is supported by the rather primitive execution of the mosaics in the main nave and side chapels, which in some cases deviates from the traditional canons of Byzantine art, and inscriptions in Vulgar Latin on most of the mosaics.

Chronologically, these mosaics belong to the Komnenian period of Byzantine art. Nevertheless, the main characteristic features of the pictorial language of these mosaics are: flatness, lack of volume in figures, a fragmented network of draperies, with small and frequent lines. There is no heightened expression or dynamism in the figures; the image is softer and more decorative (compared to previous Sicilian mosaic cycles). The figures become bulky, heavy, the expressiveness of gestures is lost, and the folds of clothing become immobile. Faces become volumetric—the heightened spirituality of Byzantine countenances disappears. A Romanesque beginning is clearly felt in the images, which also manifested itself in the cathedral's architecture: a stern tranquility emanates from the somewhat crude images.

Based on stylistic differences, a number of researchers suggest that the Monreale cycle may have been created in two stages:

- 1183—1189: Apse mosaics
- First half of the 13th century (Hohenstaufen era): Nave mosaics depicting biblical scenes.

Most researchers, however, support the traditional version that the mosaics were created between 1183 and 1189.

The mosaic cycle in the nave bears the imprint of new trends that emerged in 13th-century art: the canonical spirit began to give way to a freer interpretation of biblical events, and the features of the artist's creative personality were already somewhat evident in the depiction. For the first time in Southern Italian art, the interpretation of scripture takes on a narrative character. The nave mosaics of Monreale became one of the first links in the process of restructuring medieval consciousness, which began in the 13th century throughout Italy and ultimately led to the Proto-Renaissance and Renaissance. As Otto Demus notes, the narrative cycle of Monreale is characteristic of the period of disintegration of the classical Byzantine scheme of church decoration: this monument is cited by the researcher as an example of mosaicists using a new technique—a common landscape is used as a means of transforming adjacent scenes into a unified cycle.

Some mosaics on the upper tier were damaged in a fire in the early 19th century and were "restored" — either remade or replaced. In some cases, there was confusion (one of the medallions in the nave arch was misplaced) or deliberate iconographic substitution (in particular, Saint Restituta was replaced with Saint Agatha).

=== New chemical and mineralogical data ===
There is a lack of knowledge in regards to the raw materials as well as the type of technology utilized during the production of mosaics created after the twelfth century. Due to this lapse in knowledge and available information, an archaeometric investigation was executed, which worked to examine the materials that were used for the mosaic decoration of the South aisle wall of the Monreale Cathedral.

During this investigation, they examined pieces of fallen colored and gilded glass tesserae by combining the molecular technique of Raman spectroscopy, as well as an elemental technique which utilized a portable X-ray Fluorescence.

== Description ==
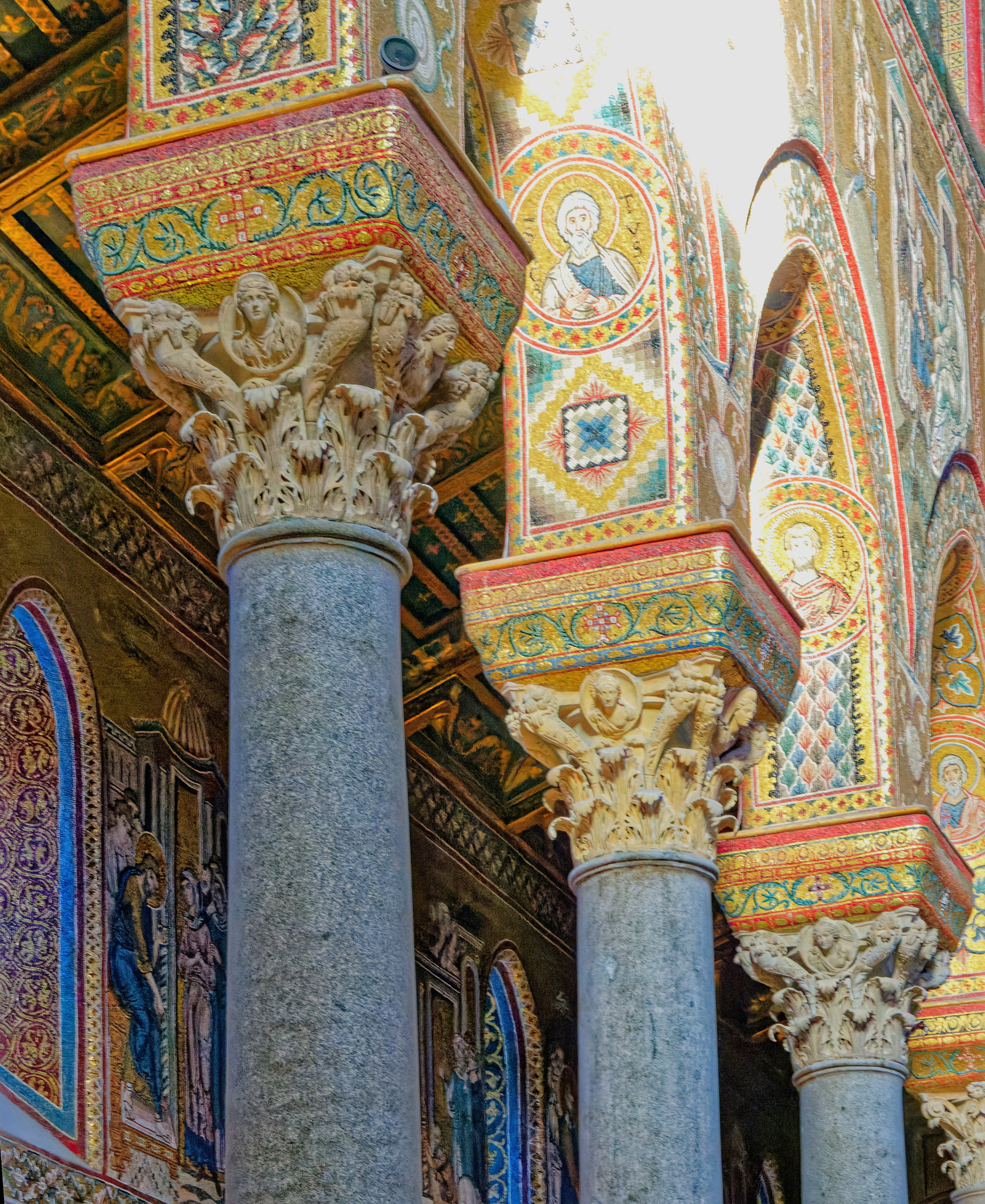

The mosaics are made of glass tesserae and were executed in Byzantine style between the late 12th and the mid-13th centuries by local masters. With the exception of a high dado, made of marble slabs with bands of mosaic between them, the whole interior surface of the walls, including soffits and jambs of all the arches, is covered with minute mosaic-pictures in bright colors on a gold ground. The mosaic pictures, depicting stories from both the Old and New Testament, are arranged in tiers, divided by horizontal and vertical bands. In parts of the choir there are five of these tiers of subjects or single figures one above another.

The interior of the Monreale Cathedral is home to a plethora of religious mosaics. The interior is extremely vast and has a multitude of opulent decoration. Amongst the mosaics are also antique columns, marble paneling along the lower sections of the walls, and an elaborate floor in the sanctuary. The mosaics, which covering the upper sections of the sanctuary and nave walls, span approximately 6,500 square meters, as mentioned prior. This expansive array of mosaics makes the Monreale Cathedral home to Italy's most extensive mosaic decoration, which surpasses that of Venice's San Marco.

=== Subjects ===
The Monreale Cathedral Mosaics depict a number of well-known and renowned religious figures and iconography. There are also depictions of stories from the Bible represented within the many mosaic decorations of the Monreale Cathedral, including the journey of Noah's Ark along with the labour of Adam and Eve.

As shown in the first figure of the East apse, there is a prominent hand-figure of Christ Pantocrator, which exhibits a superior style when compared to other depicted figures. Christ is the largest figure compared to the other smallers figures below and surrounding the East Apse. Below, the next focal point is an image of an enthroned Madonna and Child, whom are flanked by archangels and apostles.

There are also enthroned images of the apostles, Saint Peter and Saint Paul, that are displayed on the apse culottes, where scenes from their lives decorate the nearby walls.

A comprehensive depiction of the life of Christ is shown across three levels upon the walls of the crossing as well as the Cathedral's transepts. This mosaic narrative extends into the nave, where there are forty two scenes taken from the Genesis which are portrayed across two separate levels. Additionally, the side aisles feature mosaics that illustrate the miracles of Christ.

Inscriptions on each picture explain the subject or saint represented; these are in Latin, except for some few which are in Greek. The subjects in the nave begin with scenes from the Book of Genesis, illustrating the Old Testament types of Christ and His scheme of redemption, with figures of those who prophesied and prepared for His coming. Around the lower tier and the choir are subjects from the New Testament, chiefly representing Christ's miracles and suffering, with apostles, evangelists and other saints.

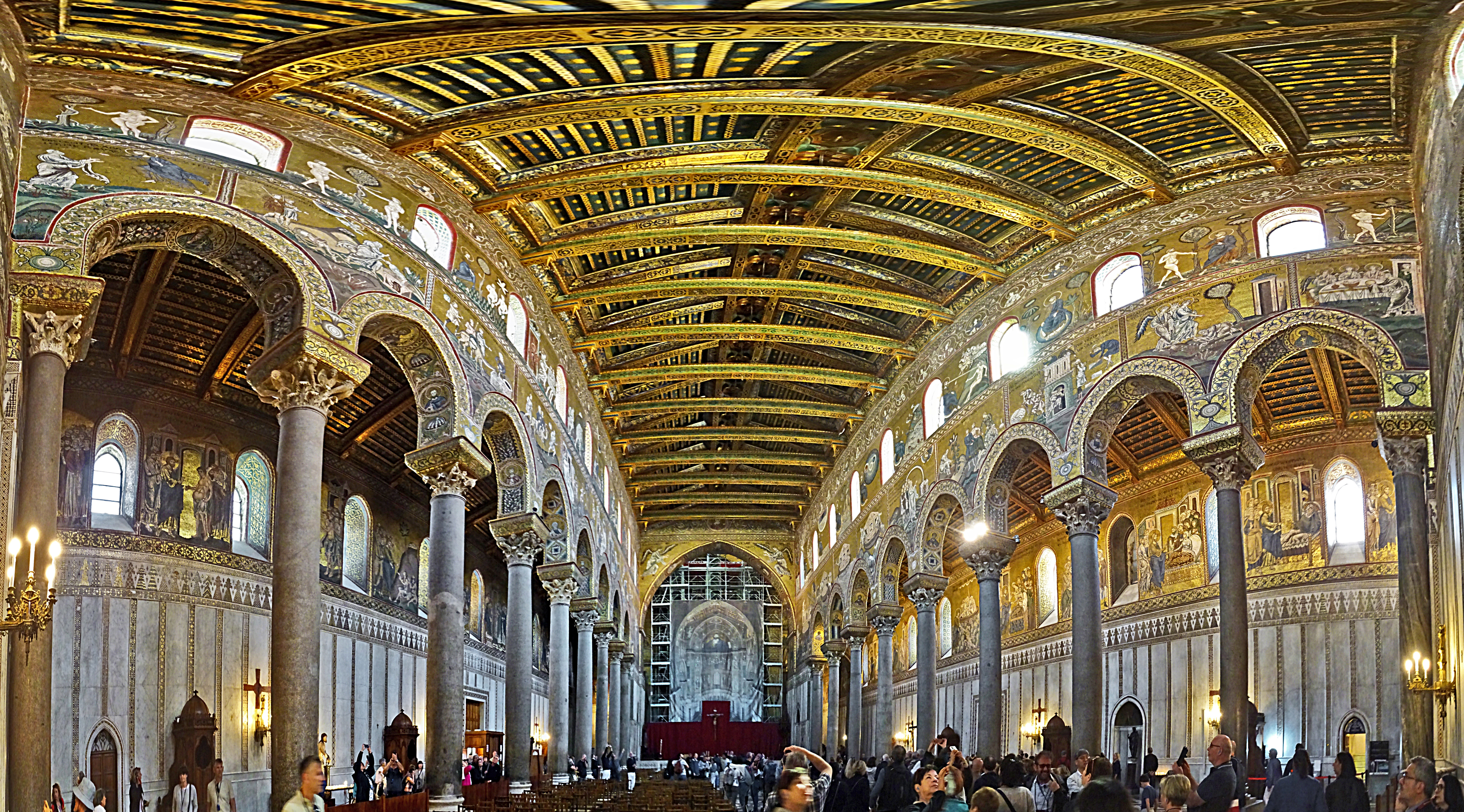

The mosaic series of the cathedral is divided into five large cycles:

- mosaics of the apse, representing Christ Pantocrator in His heavenly glory
- mosaics of the main nave (Book of Genesis)
  - Creation cycle
  - Story of Adam and Eve
  - Story of Cain and Abel
  - Noah's Flood cycle
    - Building the Tower of Babel
  - Forefathers cycle:
    - Abraham story
    - Lot's story
    - Isaac's story
    - Jacob's story
- mosaics of the side naves — Christ's miracles
- mosaics of the crossing and both wings of transept — childhood of Jesus, teaching and miracles, Passion
- mosaics of the two presbitery chapels — the lives of Apostles Peter and Paul

In addition to the narrative mosaics on the cathedral walls (in the arches, under the roof, in the choir), there are a large number of mosaic of saints — full-length or half-length (in medallions). The arches are richly decorated with mosaic patterns, recalling the influence of Arab culture on the mosaic artists of Monreale.

Also important to mention two donor's dedications:

- William II dedication moisaic (with Mary)
- William II coronation moisaic (with Christ)

== By location ==
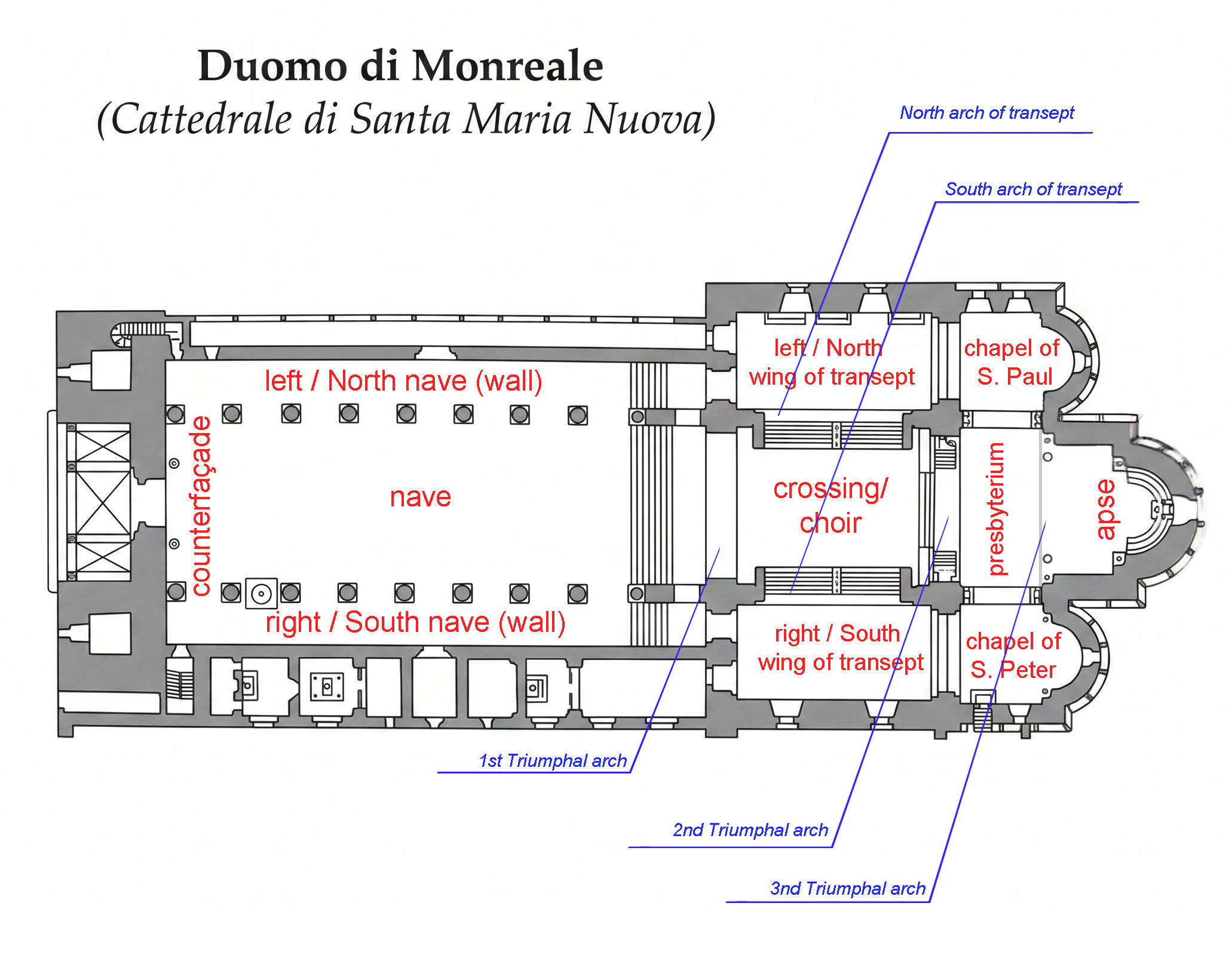

=== West wall (Counterfaçade) ===
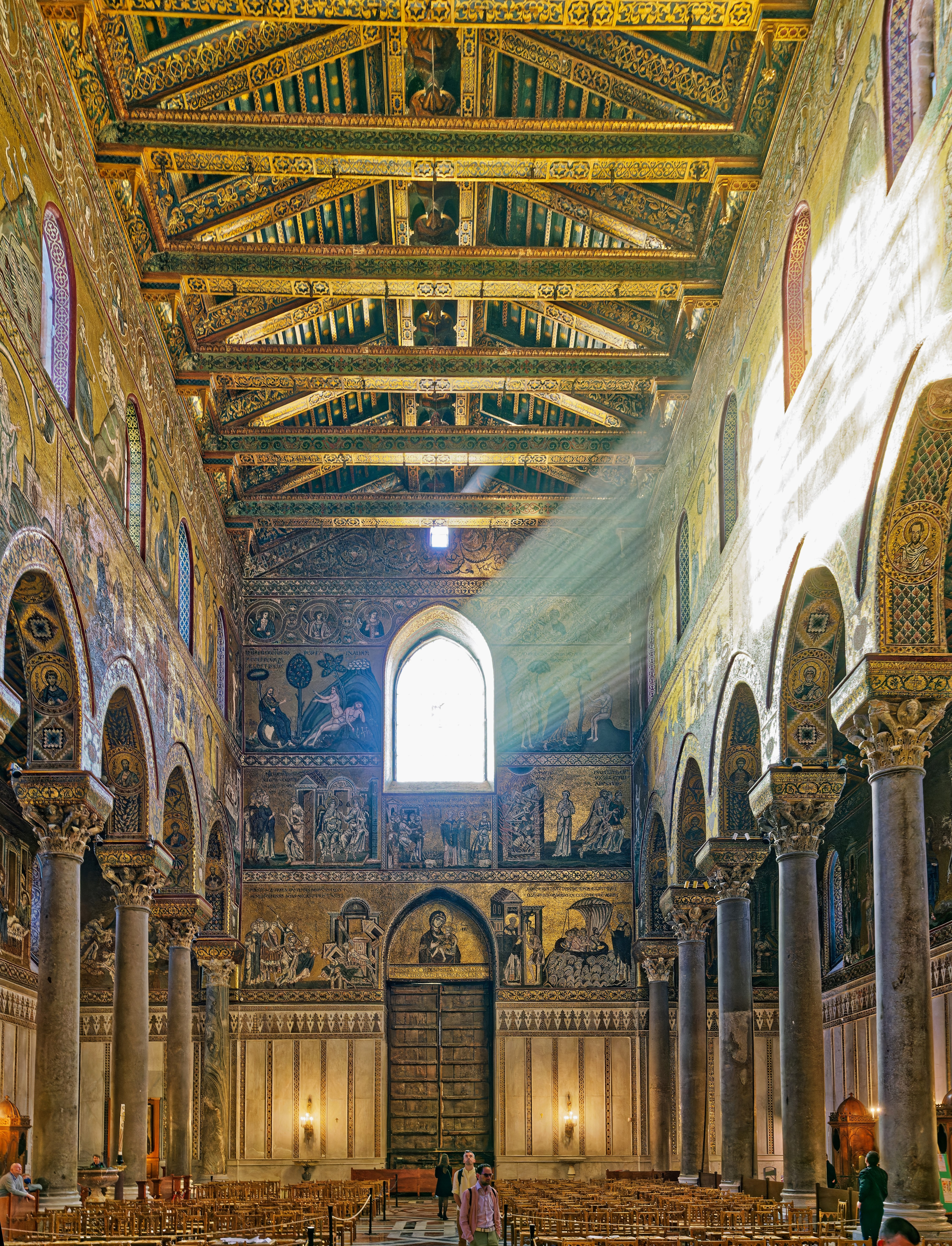

Level		South side	Main door			North side	
Medallions		Archangels	[window]			Archangels	
Bifora level		Creation of Eve	[window]			Eve Presented to Adam	
Latin inscriptions		IMMISIT DOMINUS SOPOREM IN ADAM ET TULIT EVAM DE COSTIA EIUS	[window]			ADDUCIT DOMINUS MULIEREM AD ADAM DIXITQUE ADAM HOC ENIM OS EX OSSIBUS MEIS ET CARO DE CARNE MEA	
Translation		The Lord sent a sleep on Adam and brought Eve from his side	[window]			The Lord led the woman to Adam and Adam said "For this is bone of my bone and flesh of my flesh"	
Side-roof level		Lot and the Two Angels	Saint Cassius and Saint Castus			Destruction of Sodom	
Latin inscriptions		ANGELIS DIRIGUNT OCULOS CONTRA SODOMEN SODOMITÆ VALLAVERUNT DOMUM LOTH	?			SUMMERSIUM SODOMA FUGIT LOTH CUM UXORE ET FILIABUS SUIS	
Translation		Angels direct their eyes against Sodom; the Sodomites surround Lot's house				Destruction of Sodom; Lot flees with his wife and daughters	
Bifora level	(In the aisle) Multiplication of the Loaves and Fishes - part 2	Martyrdom of Saint Cassius and Saint Castus	Madonna and Child			Miracles of Saint Castrensis	(In the aisle) Healing of the Infirm Woman - part 1
		?	SPONSA SVE PROLIS O STELLA PVERPERA SOLIS PRO CVNCTIS ORA SED PLVS PRO REGE LABORA			?	
			Bride of her offspring, O star-bearing Mother of the Sun, pray for all, but labor more for the King.				
				Medallion with starry sky			
			Michael №1	[door]	Gabriel №1		

=== South nave (right side) ===
The entire space above the pointed arches of the main nave (south and north sides of the nave) and its rear — western wall are covered with mosaics illustrating the Book of Genesis. The quality of the depiction and the composition of the main nave mosaics significantly differ from those of the apse. The main nave mosaics lack artistic perspective, human figures are disproportionately constructed, and the landscapes and architectural details are quite stylized. Yet, at the same time, these mosaics are characterized by greater naturalness, closeness to the realities of everyday life, and free poses and movements of the characters.

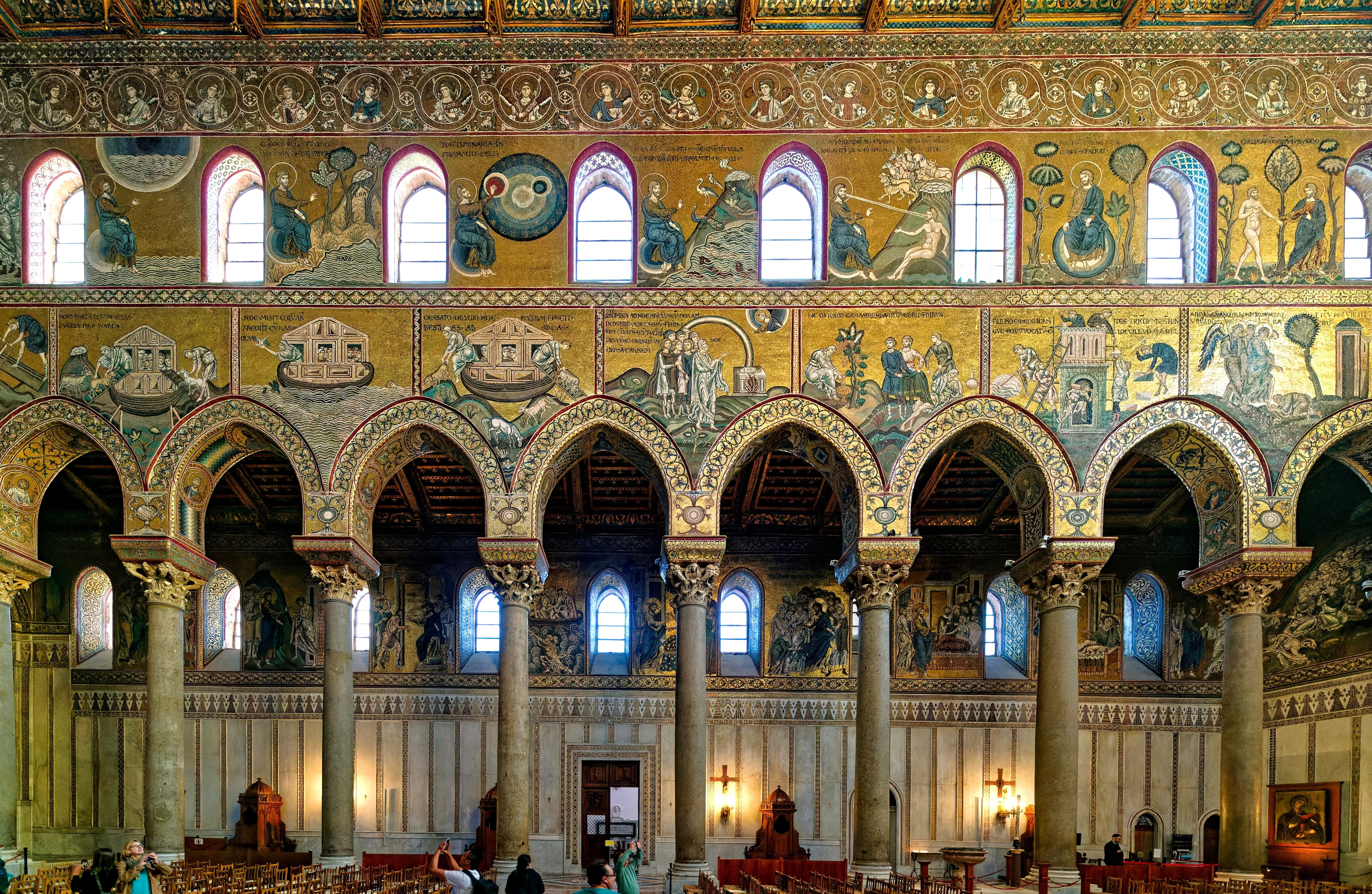

	1			2	3	4	5	6	7	8	9	10
Medallions	Archangels											
	(10)			(9)	(8)	(7)	(6)	(5)	(4)	(3)	(2)	(1)
Bifora level	Creation of Heaven and Earth			1st day: Creation of Light	2nd day: Separation of the Seas and the Dry Land	3rd day: Creation of the Dry Land	4th day: Creation of the Stars	5th day: Creation of the Fishes and Birds	6th day: Creation of the Animals and Man	7th day: God Rests from Creation	Adam Introduced to the Earthly Paradise	Adam in the Earthly Paradise
Latin inscriptions	IN PRINCIPIO CREAVIT DEUS CÆLUM ET TERRAM			FECIT DOMINUS LUCEM, APPELLAVITQUE LUCEM DIEM ET TENEBRAS NOCTEM	FECIT FIRMAMENTUM IN MEDIO AQUARUM ET DIVIDAT AQUAS AB AQUIS	CONGREGENTUR AQUÆ QUÆ SUB CÆLO SUNT IN LOCUM UNUM ET APPAREAT ARIDA	FIANT LUMINARIA IN FIRMAMENTO CÆLI	PRODUCANT AQUA REPTILE ANIMÆ VIVENTIS ET VOLATILE SUPER TERRAM SUB FIRMAMENTO CÆLI	FACIAMUS HOMINEM AD IMAGINEM ET SIMILITUDINEM NOSTRAM ET INSPIRAUIT IN FACIEM EIUS SPIRACULU VITÆ	REQUIEVIT DOMINUS DIE SEPTIMO AB OMNI OPERE QUOD PATRARAT	COLLOCAVIT DEUS ADAM IN PARADISO	REQUIEVIT ADAM IN PARADISO
Translation	In the beginning God created the Heaven and the Earth			He made the light, and he called the light day and the darkness night	He set the sky in the midst of the waters and divided the waters	Let the water under the sky be gathered in one place and let dry ground appear	Let there be lights in the sky	Let the water produce teem with living creatures and let birds fly over the land under the sky	Let us make man in our own image and likeness; and he breathed into him the breath of life	The Lord rested from all his work on the seventh day	God placed Adam in paradise	Adam rested in paradise
Nave pendentives	Noah Builds the Ark			The Animals Enter the Ark	Noah's Flood	The Animals Leave the Ark	God Sends the Rainbow to Noah	Drunkenness of Noah (Curse of Ham)	Building the Tower of Babel	The Three Angels Visit Abraham	Hospitality of Abraham	
Latin inscriptions	NOE SECUNDUM MANDATUM ARCAM FECIT OPERARI			NOE PONI FECIT BESTIAS ET VOLUCRE IN ARCA	NOE MISIT COLUMBAM ET REDUIT CUM RAMO OLIVA	CESSATO DILUVIO NOE EXTRABI FECIT BESTIA AB ARCA	DIXIT DOMINUS AD NOE, ARCUM MEUM PONAM IN NUBIBUS ET ERIT SIGNUM FŒDEVIS INTER ME ET TERRAM ET NON ERUNT AMPLIUS DILUVII AD DELENDA UNIVERSAM CARNEM	HIC OSTENDIT CAM VERENDO PATRIS GEMINIS FRATIBUS	FILII NOE EDIFICANTES TURRIM CONFUSA SUNT LINGUAM EORUM ET VOCATUM EST LOCUM ILLUD BABEL	ABRAHAM ANGELOS HOSPITIO SUSCEPIT ET CUM TRES VIDERET UNUM ADORAVIT	ABRAHAM MINISTRAT ANGELIS	
Translation	According to the command, Noah had an ark made			Noah had beasts and birds placed in the ark	Noah sent a dove and it returned with an olive branch	Once the flood had ended he head the beasts leave the ark	The Lord spoke to Noah "I place my bow in the sky and it shall be a sign of the covenant between the earth and I and never again will the waters become a flood to destroy all life	Here Ham tells his two brothers of their father's drunkenness	Noah's sons building a tower; their tongues are confused; and that place is called Babel	Abraham welcomed the angels and adored them, seeing the three as one	Abraham serves the angels	
	Pannutius (Paphnutius of Thebes)	[arch door]	Hilarion the Great									

==== South inner wall ====
Nave entablature inner corner	Inner part of 1st Triumphal arch	(10)	(9)	(8)	(7)	(5)	(5)	(4)	(3)	(2)	(1)	Counterfaçade
1	2	3	4	5	6	7	8	9	10	11	12	13
Riding ot the Evil Spirits out of the daughter of the woman of Cana - part 1	Riding ot the Evil Spirits out of the daughter of the woman of Cana - part 2	Saint Calogerus	Healing of the Demon-Possessed Man	Healing of the Leper	Healing the man with a withered hand	Saint Peter saved from the waves (Jesus walking on water)	Raising of the son of the widow of Nain	Healing of the Woman with an Issue of Blood	Raising of Jairus' daughter	Healing the mother of Peter's wife	Multiplication of the Loaves and Fishes - part 1	Mosaic on the corner - West wall / Counterfaçade: Multiplication of the Loaves and Fishes - part 2
MULIER MAGNA EST FIDES TUA, FIAT TIBI, SICUT PETIISTI ET SANATA EST FILIA EIUS EX ILLA HORA			OBTULERUNT AD IESUM HOMINEM MUTUM DÆMONIUM HABENTEM IESUS ET EIECTO DÆMONE LOQUUTUS EST MUTUS	SANAVIT LEPROSUM DICENTEM ILLI. DOMINE SI VIS, POTES ME MUNDARE	IESUM HOMINEM MANUM ARIDAM HABENTEM SABATO IN SYNAGOGA CURAT	IESUM SUPER MARE AMBULAT ET PETRUM MERGENTEM ALLEVAT	IESUM FILIUM VIDUÆ RESUSCITAT EXTRA PORTAM CIVITATIS NAIM	MULIER FLUXUS SANGUINIS HABENS SIMBRIAM VESTIMENTA IESU CRISTI TANGIT ET AB IPSA INFIRMITATE SANATUR	IESUS FILIAM IAYRI PRINCIPIS SYNAGOGÆ DEMO RESUSCITAT	IESUS LIBERAT SOCRUM SIMONIS A MAGNIS FEBRIBUS		IESUS QUINQUE PANIBUS ET DUOBUS PISCIBUS QUINQUE MILLIA HOMINUM SATIAVIT ET DE FRAGMENTIS DUODECIM CONFINI IMPLENTUR
"Woman, great is your faith. Let it be done for you as you desire." Her daughter was healed from that very hour.			They brought to Jesus a mute man with a demon. Jesus cured the man with leprosy, who said to him "Lord, if you will it, you can heal me and - once the devil had been thrown out - the mute man could speak.		Jesus cures the man with the withered hand in the synagogue on the Sabbath	Jesus walks on the sea and saves Peter from drowning	Jesus resurrects the widow of Nain's son in front of the city gate	The woman with the issue of blood touches Christ's robe and is healed of her illness.	Jesus resurrects the daughter of Jairus, leader of the synagogue	Jesus frees Simon's mother-in-law from a great fever		Jesus fed five thousand people with five loaves of bread and two fish, and from the fragments (leftovers), twelve baskets were filled.

==== Saints on the South nave wall ====
	1	2		3	4	5	6	7	8
		3 of 12 Holy Brothers of Benevento:		18 of Forty Martyrs of Sebaste:					
Archs	Fortunatus (Fortunatian) (from 12 Holy Brothers of Benevento); Honoratus (Onorat) (from 12 Holy Brothers of Benevento); Candedus (from Forty Martyrs of Sebaste)	Satorus; Savinianus; Donatus		Nicander; Gaius; Valerian	Eraclius; Chudius; Eunoicus	Esichius; Angias; Smaragdus	Priscus; Nicallianus; Sisinnius	Flavianus; Helianus; Cyrius	Melitus; Bivianus; Alexander
						(or namesake)			
		1	2	3		4	5	6	7
Entablature (back side of nave wall)		Eulalia	Regina	Iuxta (Justa)		Fides (№1) (Faith)	Spes (Hope)	Christina	Mitrodora

=== North nave (Left nave) ===
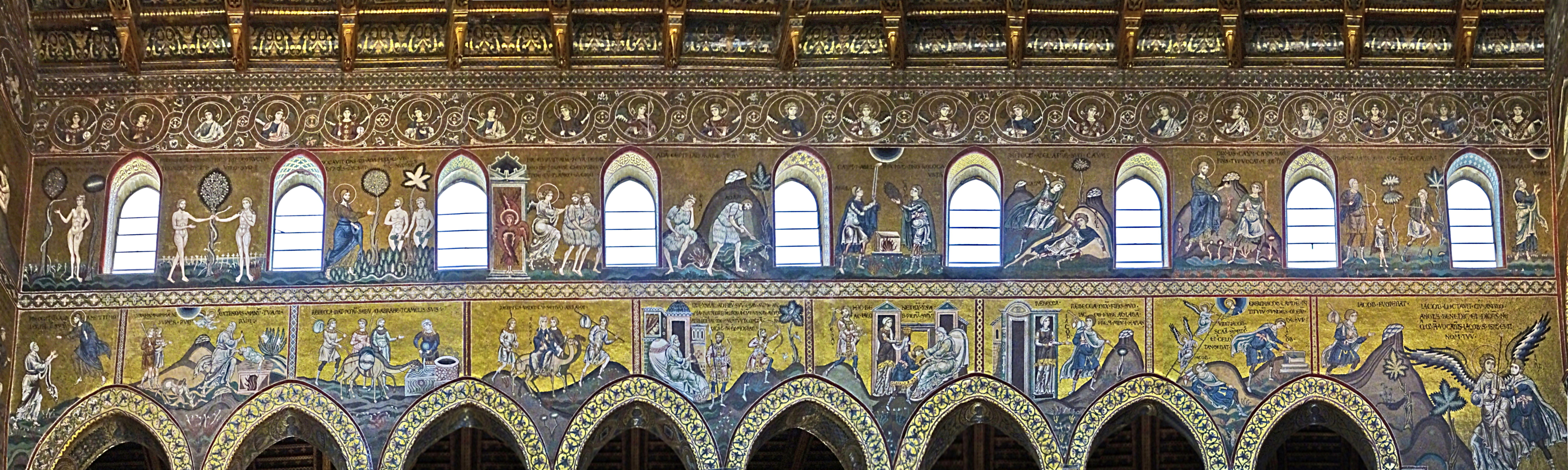

	1	2	3	4	5	6	7	8	9			10
Medallions	Archangels											
Bifora level	Eve Tempted by the Serpent	Original Sin	God Reproves Adam and Eve	Expulsion from the Earthly Paradise	Labours of Adam and Eve	Sacrifices of Cain and Abel	Cain kills Abel	God curses Cain	Lamech kills Cain			Noah commands the construction of the Ark
Latin inscriptions	MULIER SUGGESTIONI SERPENTIS TULIT DE FRUCTU ET COMEDIT DEDITQUE VIRO SUO	NEQUAQUAM MORIEMINI SI COMEDETIS ERITIS SICUT DII	VOCAVIT DOMINUS DEUS ADAM ET DIXIT EI UBI ES ET QUIS INDICAVIT TIBI QUOD NUDUS ESSES	HIC EXPULIT ADAM ET EVA DE PARADISO DEUS ET POSUIT CHERUBIM CUSTODEM CUN FLAMMEO GLADIO	ADAM CEPIT LABORARE TERREM	CAYM ET ABEL OFFERUNT DOMINO HOLOCAUSTA	INTERFECTUS ABEL A FRATRE SUO CAYM	DIXIT DEUS, CAYM, CAYM, SANGUIS FRATRIS TUI VOCAT ME DE TERRA	TRAHENS LAMECH ARCU SUO INTERFICIT CAYM			PRÆCIPT DOMINUS AD NOE DICENS FAC TIBI ARCAM DE LIGNIS LEVIGATIS
Translation	At the serpent's suggestion, the woman picked the fruit and ate it and gave it to her husband	You shall by no means die; if you eat it you shall become like God	The Lord God called Adam and said "Where are you?"; "And who told you that your were naked?"	Here God expels Adam and Eve and places a cherubim on guard with a flaming sword	Adam begins working the land	Cain and Abel offer burned-offerings to the Lord	Abel Killed by his Brother Cain	God said "Cain, Cain, your brother's blood calls to me from the earth"	Dragging his arch Lamech kills Cain			The Lord commanded Noah, saying "Make for yourself an ark of cypress wood"
Nave pendentives	God orders Abraham to sacrifice Isaac	Sacrifice of Isaac	Rebecca waters the Camels	Rebecca's Journey	Isaac and Esau	Isaac blesses Jacob	Jacob flees	Jacob's dream	Jacob wrestling with the angel			
Latin inscriptions	PRÆCEPIT DEUS ABRAHÆ UT IMMOLARET FILIUM SUUM	ABRAHAM, ABRAHAM, NE EXDENDAS MANUM TUAM SUPER PUERUM	REBECCA DAT POTUM SERVO ABRAHÆ ET CAMELIS SUIS	REBECCA VADIT CUM SERVO ABRAHÆ	DIXIT ISAAC AD FILIUM SUUM ESAU SUME ARMA TUA ET EGREDERE FORA CUMQUE VENATUM ALIQUOD APPREBENDES FACINDE PALMENTUM UT COMENDAM ET BENEDICAM TIBI ANTEQUAM MORIAM	HIC BENEDIXIT ISAAC IACOB FILIUM SUUM	REBECCA DIXIT FILIO SUO JACOB FUGE AD LABAN FRATREM MEUM IN HARAM	VIDIT JACOB SCALAM SUMMITAS EIUS CÆLOS TANGEBAT - EREXIT JACOB LAPIDEM IN TITULUM FUNDENS OLEUM DESUPER - JACOB FUGIEBAT -	JACOB INALAVIT CUM ANGELO ANGELUS BENEDIXIT ET DICENS NEQUAQUAM VOCABERIS JACOB, SED ISRAEL ERIT NOMEN TUUM			
Translation	God commands Abraham to sacrifice his son	Abraham, Abraham, do not reach out your hand against the boy	Rebecca gives drink to Abraham's servant and his camels	Rebecca goes with Abraham's servant	Isaac said to his son "Esau, take your arms and your bow and with them go hunt for something. Prepare me food that I may give you my blessing before I die	Here Isaac Blesses his son Jacob	Rebecca said to her son Jacob "Flee to Laban, my brother in Haram"	Jacob saw a ladder reaching up to heaven - Jacob set up the stone as a pillar, pouring oil upon it - Jacob was fleeing	Jacob wrestles with an angel; the angel blessed him, saying "You shall no longer be called Jacob, but Israel shall be your name"			
									Onuphrius the Great	[arch door]	Macarius the Great	

==== North inner wall ====
Counterfaçade	(1)	(2)	(3)	(4)	(5)	(6)	(7)	(8)	(9)	(10)	Inner part of 1st Triumphal arch	Nave entablature inner corner
1	2	3	4	5	6	7	8	9	10	11	12	13
Mosaic on the corner - West wall / Counterfaçade: Healing of the Infirm Woman - part 1	Healing of the Infirm Woman - part 2	Healing a man with dropsy	Cleansing ten lepers	Healing the two blind men in Galilee	Cleansing of the Temple	Jesus and the woman taken in adultery	Healing the paralytic at Capernaum	Healing of the crippled and the blind	Anointing at Bethany	Saint Firmus (unidentified, possibly some martyr)	Healing the royal official's son - part 1	Healing the royal official's son - part 2
IESUS MULIERUM ANNIS DECEM ET OCTO CURVAM ERIGIT ET ARCHISYNAGOGUM INDIGNATEM INCREPAT		IESUS IN DOMO CUJUSDAM PRINCIPIS FARISEORUM SANAT HYDROPICUM DIE SABBATI	IESUS CUM INGREDERETUR QUODDAM CASTELLUM DECEM VIRI LEPROSI OCCURRERUNT EI QUOS UT VIDIT DIXIT OSTENDITE VOS SACERDOTIBUS ET DUM IRENT MUNDATI SUNT	IESUS ILLUMINAT DUOS CÆCOS SECUS VIAM SEDENTES ET CLAMANTES DOMINI MISERERE NOSTRIS	IESUS EJECIT DE TEMPLO OVES ET BOVES ET MENSAS NUMMULARIORUM EVERTIT	IUDAEI TENTANTES ADDUCUNT AD IESUM MULIEREM IN ADULTERIO DEPREHENSAM	MISERUNT IN TEMPLUM HOMINEM PARALYTICUM IN LECTO ANTE PEDES IESU ET SANAVIT EUM	IESUS SANAT CÆCOS ET CLAUDIOS	MARIA MAGDALENA UNGIT PEDES IESUS LACRIMIS LAVAT ET CAPILLIS EXTERGIT			DOMINI FILIUS MEUS JACET IN LECTO PARALYTICUS ET MALE TORQUETUR
Jesus heals the woman infirm for 18 years and clashes with the indignant leaders of the synagogue		Jesus heals the man with dropsy in the house of the leader of the Pharisees on the Sabbath day	Entering a town, Jesus healed ten men with leprosy and told them "Show yourselves to the priests"; and as they went they were made clean	Jesus gives sight to two blind men sitting by the road and shouting "Lord, have pity on us"	Jesus throws the sheep and cattle out of the temple and overturns the money-changers' tables	The Jews take the woman caught in adultery before Jesus to test him	They sent the paralysed man in to the temple in his bed before Jesus' feet and he healed him	Jesus heals the crippled and the blind	Mary Magdalene washes Jesus' feet with her tears and dries them with her hair			Lord, my son lies paralysed in bed and in great pain

==== Saints on the North nave wall ====
	1	2		3	4	5	6	7	8
	3 of 12 Holy Brothers of Benevento:	21 of Forty Martyrs of Sebaste:							
Archs	Septimius (Septiminus); Repositus; Avronti (Orontius)	Theodolus; Sacerdon; Edicius		Quirianus; Domnus; Etius	Valerius; Helias; Acatius	Iohannes; Angias; Filocthimus	Leontius; Iohannes; Claudius	Gorgonianus; Lysimnacus; Santhius	Euthitius; Diometian; Theophilus
						(or namesake)			
						(or namesake)	(or namesake)		
		1	2	3		4	5	6	7
Entablature (back side of nave wall)		Ninfodora (Nymphodora)	Theodora of Alexandria	Fides (№2) (possibly Faith of Agen)		Caritas (Charity)	Odilia (possibly Odile of Alsace)	Marina of Antioch	Potentiana (Pudentiana)

=== First Triumphal arch ===
		Sophia Holy Wisdom of God		
Mosaic can be seen only inside the left nave: Healing the royal official's son				Mosaic can be seen only inside the left nave: Riding ot the Evil Spirits out of the daughter of the woman of Cana
Mosaic can be seen only inside the left nave: Healing the royal official's son	Michael №2	[arch]	Gabriel №2	Mosaic can be seen only inside the left nave: Riding ot the Evil Spirits out of the daughter of the woman of Cana
Description of 2 saints inside the left arch see in: Left wing transept - West wall with arch		[arch]		Description of 2 saints inside the right arch see in: Right wing transept - West wall with arch
	Medallions with Bible kings and prophets			
		Obieth (possibly Obed?)		
	Jesse		David	
		[arch]		
	Solomon	[arch]	Roboam (Rehoboam)	
	Marcian (Martial of Limoges)	[arch]	Irland (Gerland of Agrigento)	

=== Crossing ===
==== South arch of transept ====
Annunciation to Zechariah	[window]	Zechariah leaves the Temple	[window]	Annunciation	[window]	Visitation
ZACHARIAS STUPEFACTUS IN TEMPLO VERBIS ANGELI OBMUTUIT		ZACHARIAS DE TEMPLO EGREDITUR, NON VALENS LOQUI EXPECTANTIBUS		ANNUNCIATIO SANCTÆ MARIÆ		AUDIVIT SALUTATIONEM MARIÆ, EXULTAVIT INFANS IN UTERO HELISABET
Zechariah is struck dumb for not believing the angel's words in the temple		Zechariah leaves the temple, unable to speak to those awaiting him		Annunciation to the Virgin Mary		On hearing Mary's greeting, the child leaps in Elisabeth's womb
Second Joseph's Dream				Flight into Egypt		
	ANGELIS IN SOMNIS LOQUITUR IOSEPH, TOLLE PUERUM ET FUGE IN ÆGIPTUM			?		
	An angel spoke to Joseph in a dream, [saying] "Take the boy and flee to Egypt"					
Vitus	[arch]					Modestius (Modestus)
Marcellianus	[arch]					Marcus
Leontius (brother of Cosmas and Damian)	[arch]					Euprepius (brother of Cosmas and Damian)
Arch inner border
	Medallions with Old Testament persons from Tree of Jesse:					
			Phares (Perez)			
	Efron (possibly, Ephron the Hittite?)	[arch]			Aram (Ram)	
	Aminadab (Amminadab)	[arch]			Naason (Nahshon)	
	Salmon	[arch]			Booz (Boaz)	
	Ursinus of Bourges	[arch]			Castaldus (Catald)	

==== South arch of crossing (Back side of 1st triumphal arc) ====
[window]	Angels from Nativity scene	[window]	Angels from Nativity scene	[window]	Angels from Nativity scene	[window]	Angels from Annunciation to the shepherds scene	[window]
Doubt of Saint Joseph	[window]		Nativity (sleeping Mary)	[window]	Nativity (midwife Salome)	[window]		Annunciation to the shepherds
SANCTUS IOSEPH		NATIVITAS IESUS CHRISTI						PASTORES
Saint Joseph		Nativity of Jesus Christ						Shepherds
Presentation in the Temple					Jesus among doctors			
PRESENTATIO CHRISTI IN TEMPLO					STETIT IN MEDIO DOCTORUM			
Presentation of Christ in the Temple					He stood amidst the doctors			
Prophet Malachi	Description of medallions and figures of saints in the arch border see in: First Triumphal arch							Prophet Isaiah
	[arch]							
ECCE EGO MITTAM ANGELUM MEUM ET PROPERABO	[arch]							SPIRITUS DOMINI SUPER ME PROPTER QUOD
Behold, I will send my messenger who will prepare	[arch]							The Spirit of the Lord is on me, because

==== North arch of transept ====
Journey of the Magi	[window]	Adoration of the Magi	[window]	Herod orders the Massacre of the Innocents	[window]	Massacre of the Innocents
MAGI VIDENTES STELLAM IN ORIENTEM VENERUNT IN HIERUSALEM		MAGI MUNERA OFFERUNT DOMINO IESU CHRISTO		HERODE REX. ITE OCCIDITE OMNES PUERES A BIMATU ET INFRA		IUSSU HERODIS TRUCIDANT PUEROS, RACHEL PLORAT FILIOS SUOS
Seeing a star in the east, the Magi come to Jerusalem		The Magi offer their gifts to the Lord Jesus Christ		King Herod. "Go kill all the boys aged two and under."		They slaughter the boys according to Herod's command; "Rachel weeps for her children"
Wedding at Cana				Baptism of Christ		
JESUS SEDENS AD NUPTIAS DE AQUA FECIT VINUM				BAPTISMUS CHRISTI		
Sitting at the wedding in Cana, Jesus turns water into wine				Baptism of Christ		
Castulus	[arch]					Alexius of Rome
Genesius (possibly Genesius of Rome)	[arch]					Felitius (possibly Felix - some Felix of Rome, the priest (feast day January 14) or Felix of Nola)
Herculian (possibly Herculan of Porto or Herculanus of Rome)	[arch]					Triphon (Tryphon of Apamea)
Medallions with Kings of Judah:
			Abias (Abijah)			
this 3 persons may be in other order	? Asa	[arch]			Iosaphat (Jehoshaphat)	
this 3 persons may be in other order	? Ioram (Jehoram)	[arch]			Ozias (Uzziah)	
this 3 persons may be in other order	? Ioatam (Jotham)	[arch]			Aehaz (Ahaz)	
	Lambert of Maastricht	[arch]			Januarius	

=== Transept ===
The mosaics of the presbytery and transept are dedicated to the events of Christ's earthly life, although they do not include most of the Gospel miracles (these are depicted in the mosaics of the side aisles). The mosaics of this cycle can best be seen from within the presbytery itself, access to which was, until recently, closed to laypersons. Consequently, these mosaics often escaped the attention of both visitors and guidebooks. Yet, many of these mosaics stand out for their particular dramatic intensity and vividness of depiction.

==== Right wing transept ====
West wall with arch
Healing the paralytic at Bethesda	Healing the blind and halt		
?	?		
Entry into Jerusalem	Last Supper		
?	?		
Jesus before Pilate	Peter's denial		
?	?		
	Roman (Romanus of Condat)	[arch]	Egidius (Giles)

South wall
	medallion (archangel ?)	[window]	medallion (archangel ?)	
1st Temptation of Christ	[window]	2nd Temptation of Christ	[window]	3rd Temptation of Christ
?	[window]	?	[window]	?
Christ and the Samaritan Woman	Transfiguration	[window]	Rising of Lazarus	Disciples and the Donkey (Preparation for the Entry into Jerusalem)
?	?	[window]	?	?
Washing the feet of apostles	[window]	Agony in the Garden	[window]	Kiss of Judas
?		?		?

East wall with arch
Martyrdom of Saint Peter
CRUCIFIXIO SANCTI PETRI
Crucifixion of Saint Peter
Tree	[arch]	Tree
Ornament	[arch]	Ornament
Inner border of arch
	Euthymius the Great	
Zosimas of Palestine	[arch]	S(an)C(tu)S PAVLl(us) P(r)IM(us) HER(mitas) (Paul of Thebes)
Cyrus of Alexandria	[arch]	John of Alexandria

North wall with arch (backside of South arch of transept)
Figures of six female saints:
Scholastica	Medallions and figures in inner border of arch: see description above in "South arch of transept"	Dominica (Kyriaki)
	[arch]	
Sabina	[arch]	Susanna of Rome
Justina	[arch]	Tecla (Thecla of Iconium)

==== Left wing transept ====
West wall with arch
Christ led to Golgotha			Crucifixion
IESUS CHRISTUS DUCTUS AD CRUCIS PASSIONE			IESUS CHRISTI CRICIFIXIO
Jesus Christ led to his cross and passion			Jesus Christ crucified
Women at the grave (Myrrhbearers)			Noli me tangere
ITE ET DICITE DISCIPULIS EIUS ET PETRO QUIA SURREXTIT ET NON EST HIC			NOLI ME TANGERE, NONDUM ENIM ASCENDI AD PATREM MEUM
Go and tell his disciples and Peter that he has risen and is not here			"Do not touch me, for I have not yet ascended to my father"
Doubting Thomas
	[arch]		
	[arch]	JESUS DICIT THOMA, INFER DIGITUM TUUM HIC ET OFFER MANUM TUAM IN LATUS MEUM	
	[arch]	Jesus said to Thomas, "Place your finger here and put your hand in my side"	
Columbanus		Philibertus of Jumièges	

North wall
	medallion (archangel ?)	[window]	medallion (archangel ?)	
Descent from the Cross	[window]	Entombent of Christ	[window]	Harrowing of Hell
DESCENSIO CORPORIS CHRISTI		CORPUS CHRISTI PONITUR IN SEPULCHRO		RESURRECTIO CHRISTI
Christ's body taken down [from the cross]		Christ's body placed in the tomb		Resurrection of Christ
Apparition on the road to Emmaus	Supper at Emmaus (with Christ)	Supper at Emmaus (Disciples remaining)	The two disciples return to Jerusalem from Emmaus	
QUI SUNT HI SERMONES, QUO CONFERTIS AD INVICEM AMBULANTES ET ESSIS TRISTES	COGNOVERUNT EUM IN FRACTIONE PANIS	NONNE COR NOSTRUM ARDENS ERAT IN NOBIS DE IESU	INGRESSI IN HIERUSALEM DUO DISCIPULI, INVENERUNT CONGREGATOS UNDECIM DICENTES, QUOD SURREXIT DOMINUS VERE ET APPARUIT SIMONI	
"What are you sadly talking of as you walk along?"	They knew him in the breaking of bread.	"Did not our hearts burn within us because of Jesus?"	Entering Jerusalem, the two disciples went to the eleven gathered together, who said to them "The Lord has risen indeed and has appeared to Simon."	
Second Miraculous catch of fish	[window]	Ascension	[window]	Pentecost
PETRO MERGENTE IN MARE TRAHENTIBUS DISCIPULIS PLENUM RETE	? Golden inscription ?	ASCENSIO DOMINI	? Golden inscription ?	PENTECOSTEN
Peter jumping into the sea, with the disciples dragging the full net		Ascension of the Lord		Pentecost

East wall with arch
Martyrdom of saint Paul
?
Tree	[arch]			Tree
Ornament	[arch]			Ornament
Inner border of arch
		Sabbas the Sanctified		
	Pachomius the Great		Arsenius the Great	
		[arch]		
Hermolaus of Nicomedia	[arch]			Pantaleon of Nicomedia

South wall with arch (backside of North arch of transept)
Figures of six female saints:
	Heavenly Jerusalem	Heavenly Bethlehem	
	Medallions and figures in inner border: see description above in "North arch of transept"		
now (since 1818-1821): Agatha; before fire and restoration: Restituta	[arch]		Margarita of Antioch
Catherine	[arch]		Radegunda
Benera (Venera / Paraskevi)	[arch]		Julitta and Quiriacus (Cyricus)

=== Second triumphal arch ===
Five military saints:
John of Rome	Mercurius of Caesarea	George (№1)	Theodorus (Theodore Stratelates or Theodore Tiron)	Demetrius of Thessaloniki	Paul of Rome
Tree	[arch]				Tree
Inner part
	Medallions with patriarchs:				
		Melchizedek			
	Noah	[arch]		Enoch	
	Coat of arms	[arch]		[nothing]	
	Isaac	[arch]		Abraham	
	Judas	[arch]		Jacob	
	William II coronation moisaic	[arch]		William II dedication moisaic	
	Coat of arms	[arch]		[nothing]	
Reverse side of arch (view from presbyterium)
Angel	[arch]				Angel

=== Presbyterium ===
South wall
Tree	[window]	Habbakuk	[window]	Isaiah	[window]	Tree
Obadiah		Joel		Jeremiah	Amos	
Tree	[arch]					Tree
	Medallions in arch border					
			Cesarius (Caesarius of Terracina)			
		[arch]				
	Eleutherius (possibly that one)	[arch]			Ypolit (Hippolitus of Rome)	
	Damian	[arch]			Cosmas	

North wall
Tree	[window]	Jacob	[window]	Zechariah	[window]	Tree
Malachi		Jonah		Ezekiel	Moses	
Tree	[arch]					Tree
	Medallions in arch border:					
		Euplius				
	Maurus the Abbot	[arch]			Placidus	
	Sergius	[arch]			Bacchus	

==== Chapel of Saint Peter (right / South) ====
West wall
Liberation of Peter
	PRÆCEPIT ANGELUS PETRO, UT CITO SURGAT, ET VELOCITER DE CARCERE EXEAT					
	Then the Angel commanded Peter "Get up quickly and quickly leave the prison"					
Sixtus	Saint Peter enthroned					Boniface
Savin (Sabinus of Canosa)						German of Capua
	SANCTUS PETRUS PRINCEPS APOSTOLORUM, CUI TRADITÆ, SUNT CLAVES REGNI CÆLORUM					
	Saint Peter, Prince of the Apostles, to whom were handed the keys of the Kingdom of Heaven					
Medallions:		[window] with 3 medallions			Medallions:	
Marin (Marinus of Caesarea)	Alexander Miles (unidentified warrior)	[window] with 3 medallions			Claudian (unidentified martyr)	Severinus of Noricum
			Quartus			
		Marcian	[window]	Nicander		

South wall
Angel led Peter from prison
SE SCIENS LIBERATUM AB ANGELO PETRUS SECURÉ VADIT AD HOSPITIUM
Knowing himself freed by an angel, Peter safely goes to his host
Raising of Tabitha	[window]	Peter meets Paul in Rome
HIC INOPEM SUSCITAVIT TABITAM, DICEM TABITA SURGE		HIC PAULUS VENIT ROMAM ET PACEM FECIT CUM PETRO
Here he resurrected poor Tabitha, saying "Tabitha, arise"		Here Paul came to Rome and made peace with Peter
Peter with Simon Magus at emperor Nero	[window]	Fall of Simon Magus
HIC PETRUS ET PAULUS IN ROMA ANTE NERONEM DISPUTAVERUNT CUM SIMONE MAGO		HIC PRÆCEPTO PETRI ET ORATIONE PAULI SIMON MAGUS CECIDIT IN TERRAM
Here Peter and Paul disputed with Simon Magus before Nero		Here by the command of Peter and the prayer of Paul Simon Magus fell to earth

West arch (backside of East wall with arch of Right Transept)
Miracle of healing lame man by Peter
DUM PETRUS INTRAT IN TEMPLUM CUM IOHANNE SANAT CLAUDUM IN PORTA SEDENTEM
As Peter enters the temple with John he heals a lame man sitting in the gateway
Tree	Description of the medallions inside arch see in: Right wing transept - East wall with arch	Tree
	[arch]	

North arch
Peter heals a paralysed man (Miracle of healing Aeneas)
HIC PETRUS ADULIDAM, SANAVIT PARALITICUM, DICENS ENEA SANET TE DOMINUS IESUS CHRISTUS
Here Peter heals a paralysed man, saying "Aeneas, may Jesus Christ heal you"
Tree	Description of the medallions inside arch see in: Presbyterium - South wall	Tree
	[arch]	

Ceiling
Christ Emmanuel

with cherubim

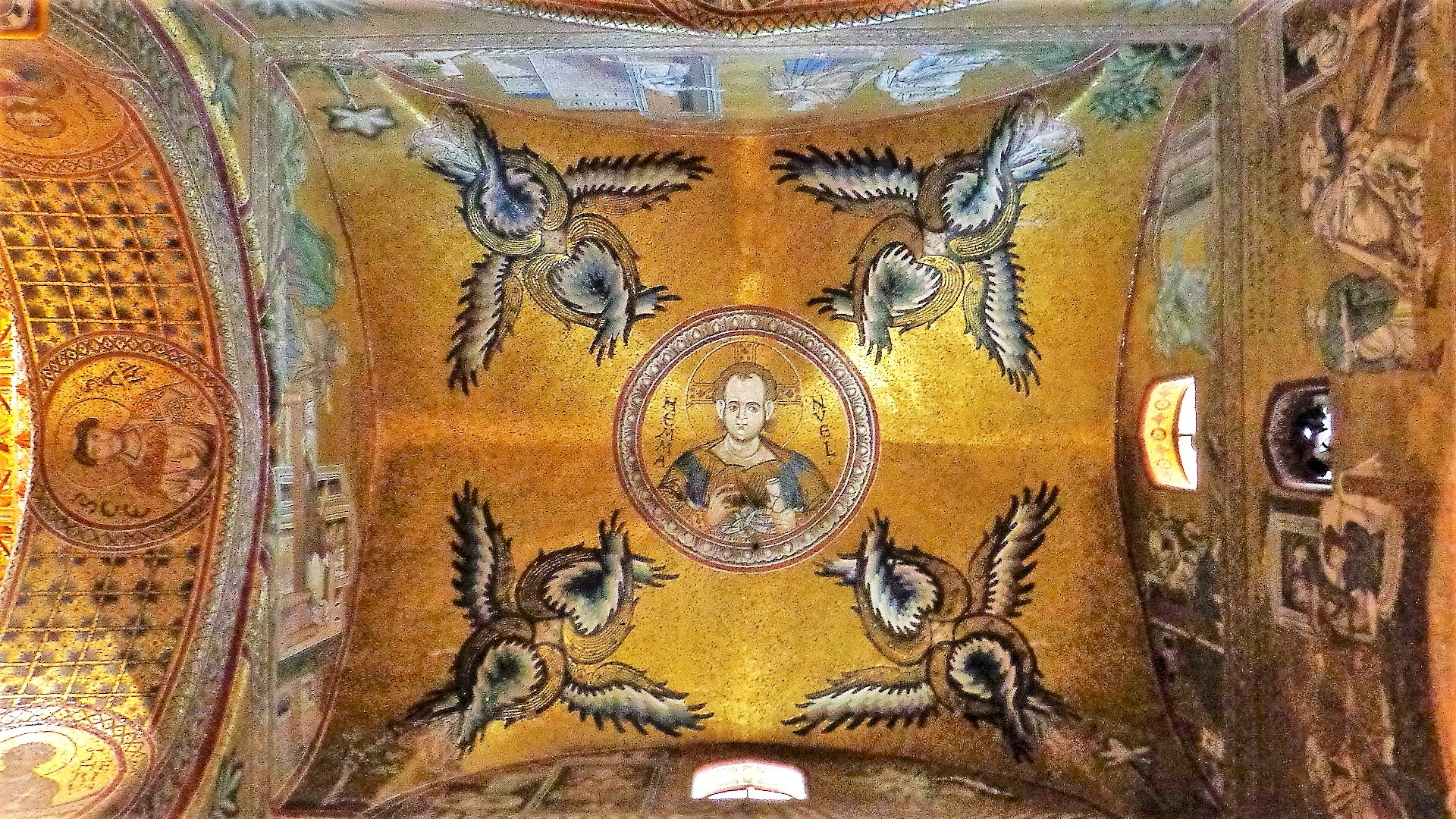

==== Chapel of Saint Paul (left / north) ====
East wall
	Converted Paul requesting letters					
John Chrysostom	Saint Paul enthroned					Gregory of Nazianzus
Ambrose of Milan						Augustine of Hippo
Cornelius	Cyprian	[window]			Nazarius	Celsus
			Senator			
		Cassiodorus	[window]	Viator		

North wall
(Some figure greeting Saint Paul ? after conversion?)
Baptism of Saint Paul	[window]	Saint Paul disputes with the jews
Saint Paul flees Damascus		Saint Paul entrusts letters to Timothy and Silas

West arch (backside of East wall with arch of Left Transept)
The blind Paul led by three companions toward city of Damascus
Tree	Description of the medallions inside arch see in: Left wing transept: East wall with arch	Tree
	[arch]	

South arch
Conversion on the road to Damascus
Tree	Description of the medallions inside arch see in: Presbyterium - North wall	Tree
	[arch]	

Ceiling
Christ Pantocrator

with cherubim

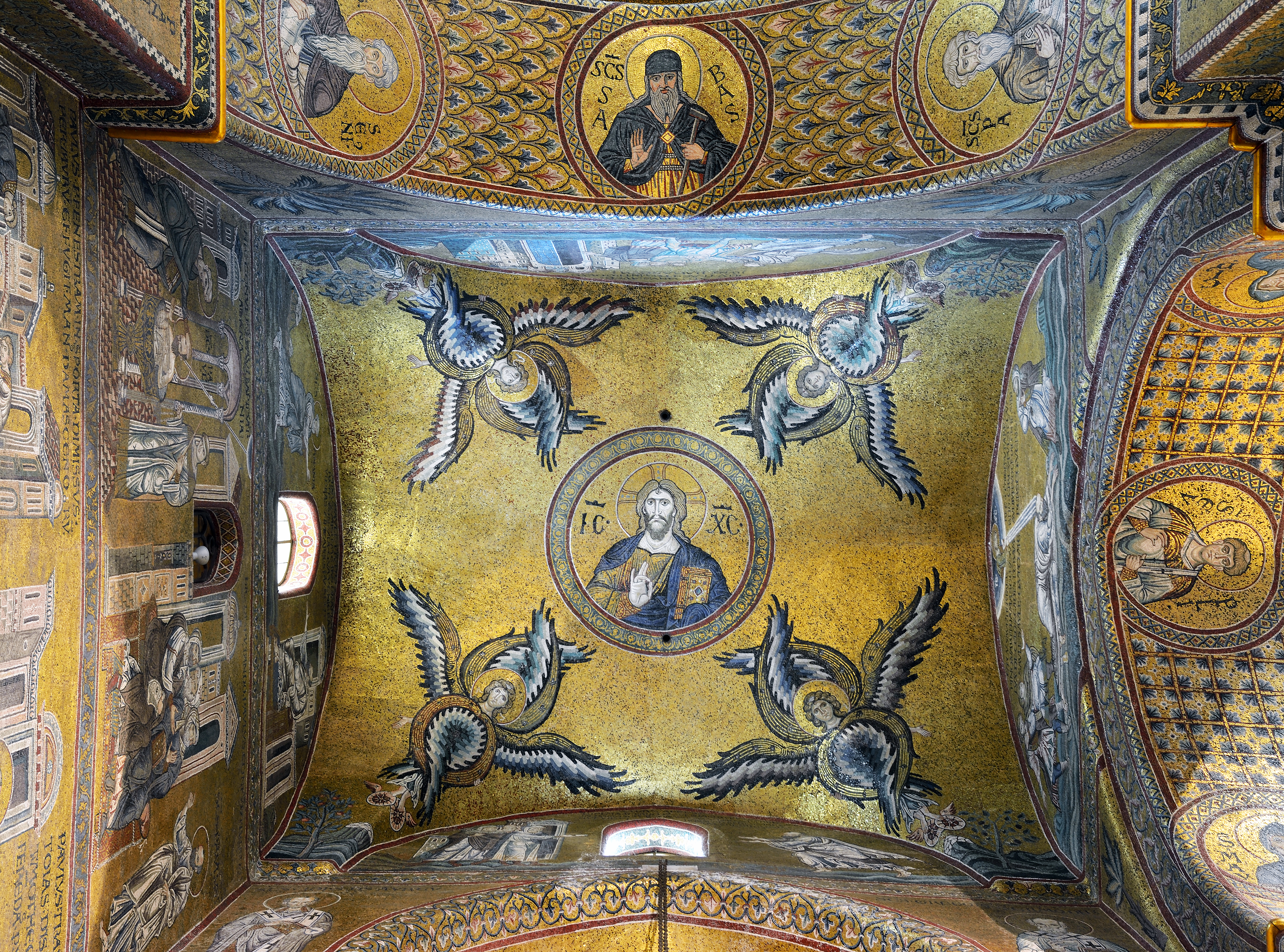

==== Third triumphal arch ====
Facade part
	Segment of the sky	
Annunciation: Gabriel (№3)	[arch]	Annunciation: Mary
Vase ornament	[arch]	Vase ornament
Simeon the Stylite	[arch]	Daniel the Stylite
Tree ornament	[arch]	Tree ornament

Inner part
			Hetoimasia			
Tetramorph and Seraphim			[arch]	Tetramorph and Cherubin		
Archangels Raphael and Michael №3			[arch]	Archangels Gabriel (№4) and Uriel		
?			[arch]	?		
Philipp	Bartholomew	Luke	[arch]	Mark	Thomas	Simon
Agatha of Sicily	Anthony the Great	Blaise	[arch]	Hilarius of Poitiers	Benedict of Nurcia	Mary Magdalene

=== Apse ===
The entire concha of the main apse is occupied by a colossal image of Christ Pantocrator. The fingers of the Savior's right hand are folded in a gesture of blessing, and in His left hand, He holds the Gospel open to the verse: "I am the light of the world. Whoever follows me will never walk in darkness, but will have the light of life" (John 8:12), written in Latin and Greek. The image of Christ Pantocrator is widespread in the Orthodox East and was adopted by Norman architecture (cathedrals in Cefalù, Messina, the Palatine Chapel). The distinction of the Monreale Pantocrator from other similar images is that the Savior's arms are widely outstretched, as if embracing everyone in the temple. The mosaic's creators also achieved an optical effect, thanks to which Christ's eyes are directed at each of the worshippers. Those parts of the figure (arms and hands, the book) which appear foreshortened due to the curvature of the niche, are enlarged and elongated to neutralize perspective distortions. The image of Christ Pantocrator is colossal: the Savior's head, including the beard, is over 3 meters high, His right arm extends 7 meters, and the entire image is 7 meters high and 13.30 meters wide.

The mosaicist who worked on the apse expanded its space by incorporating the adjoining presbytery in order to obtain sufficient room for the execution of the large and complex program commissioned to him. To define the boundaries of the new compartment, on the facade of the triumphal arch, he depicted in mosaic (as part of the iconography of the Stylite saints) the sculptural columns that actually stand in the Cefalù Cathedral, which served as his model, even reproducing their color scheme.

Surrounding the image of the Pantocrator, arranged in medallions in the inner semicircle, are eight Old Testament righteous men and prophets and another image of the Savior – Christ Emmanuel. The outer semicircle consists of the Heavenly Powers – Archangels Raphael, Michael, Gabriel, and Uriel, six-winged Cherubim and Seraphim, crying out "Holy, holy, holy is the Lord God of hosts" (Isaiah 6:3), as well as the traditional Byzantine depiction of the Hetoimasia (Prepared Throne).

Most of the apse mosaics are typically Byzantine, with inscriptions in Greek (Christ Pantocrator, the inner semicircle of Old Testament righteous men, Deisis, the Annunciation scene) and Latin (the outer semicircle of Heavenly Powers, the lower row of saints, the arch with Archangels).

Medallion border: prophets Nathan, Daniel, Isaiah, David, i n the center Christ Emmanuel, prophets Solomon, Samuel, Gideon, Elisha
	Christ Pantocrator (apse dome)							
	Apse basin: Virgin Mary with archangels and apostles							
John the Evangelist	James	Peter	Michael №4	Virgin with Child enthroned (Panachranta type)	Gabriel (№5)	Paul	Andrew	Matthew the Evangelist
	Six saints in apse basin (deacons and bishops):							
Martin of Tours	Stephen	Peter of Alexandria	Clemens of Rome	[window]	Sylvester of Rome	S(an)C(tu)S THOMAS CANTV(a)R(iensis) (Thomas of Canterbury)	Lawrence	Nicolaus (Nicholas of Myra)
				Vincent of Saragossa				
			George (№2)		Saturninus			
			Basil the Great		Gregory the Great			

== By subject (with Latin inscriptions) ==
=== Saint Paul cycle ===
	Latin inscription	Translation	Image
1	DECOLLATIO SANCTI PAULI	Beheading of Saint Paul	
2	SANCTA RESTITUTA - SANCTA MARGARITA - SANCTA CATHERINA; SANCTA RADEGUNDIS - SANCTA VENERA - SANCTA IUDICTA		
3	AD MANUS AUTEM ILLUM TRAHENTES INTRODUXERUNT DAMASCUM	but carrying him by hand, they brought him to Damascus	
4	SALVE FRATER DOMINUS MISIT ME IESUS, QUI APPARUIT TIBI IN VIA QUA VENIEBAS, UT VIDEAS ET IMPLEARIS SPIRITO SANCTO	Hail, brother, Lord Jesus sent me, he who appeared to you on the road on which you were going, that you may see and be filled with the Holy Spirit	
5	HIC CONVERSUS PAULUS BAPTIZATUR AB ANANIA	Here the convereted Saint Paul is baptised by Ananias	
6	HIC DISPUTANDO PAULUS CONFUNDIT IUDÆOS	Here Paul confutes the Jewish in debate	
7	PAULUS PER FENESTRAM IN SPORTAM DIMISSUS PER MURUM, EFFUGIT MANUS DAMASCENORUM	Escaping through a window in the wall, Paul flees the hands of the Damascenes	
8	PAULUS TRADIT EPISTOLAS DISCIPULIS SUIS TIMOTHEO ET SYLEÆ DEFERENDAS PER UNIVERSUM ORBEM	Paul hands letters to his disciples Timothy and Silas to carry to the whole world	
9	ET CUM PAULUS ITER FACERET CONTIGIT, UT APPROPINQUARET DAMASCU ET SUBITO CIRCUMSULSIT EUM LUX DE CÆLO ET; CADENS IN TERRAM AUDIVIT VOCEM DICENTEM SIBI, SAULE, SAULE, QUID ME PERSEQUERIS	and with Paul made their way to Damascus; and suddenly he was surrounded by heavenly light and fell to the ground, hearing a voice saying to him "Saul, Saul, why do you persecute me?"	
10	SAULUS ABIT AD PRINCIPEM SACERDOTUM ET PETIIT AB EO EPISTOLAS IN DAMASCUM ET AB SYNAGOGAS, UT SI QUOS, INVENISSET HUJUS VIÆ VIROS, AC MULIERES VINCTOS DUCERET IN HIERUSALEM	Saul goes to the priest's house and seeks letters from him letters to Damascus and the synagogues, that he may in this way find and defeat the men and women and bring them to Jerusalem	
11	FOUR SERAPHIM - SANCTUS SABBA - SANCTUS ARSENIUS - SANCTUS PACHOMIUS SANCTUS PANTALEO - SANCTUS HERMOLAUS - SANCTUS EUPLIUS - SANCTUS PLACIDUS SANCTUS MAURUS - SANCTUS SERGIUS - SANCTUS BACCHUS SANCTUS IOHANNES OS AUREUM - SANCTUS GREGORIUS FERMO DEI - SANCTUS AMBROSIUS - SANCTUS AGUSTINUS SANCTUS CIPRIANUS - SANCTUS NAZARIUS - SANCTUS CORNELIUS - SANCTUS CELSIUS SANCTUS SENATOR - SANCTUS CASTODORUS - SANCTUS VIATOR		
12	SANCTUS PAULUS PRÆDICATOR VERITATIS ET DOCTOR GENTIUM	Saint Paul, preacher of the truth and Doctor of the Gentiles	

== Links ==
- Virtual tour
- Gallery

== Bibliography ==
- Giovanni Luigi Lello (1596). Historia della Chiesa di Monreale ... (in Italian). Vol. 258 pages. Roma: Luigi Zannetti.
- Michele del Giudice (1702). Descrizione Del Real Tempio, E Monasterio Di Santa Maria Nuova, di Morreale ... (in Italian). Vol. 136 pages. Palermo: Regia Stamperia d'Agostino Epiro.
- Serradifalco, Domenico. Del duomo di Monreale e di altre chiese siculo normanne (1838).
- Domenico Benedetto Gravina. Il Duomo di Monreale illustrato. 1859.
- Duncan-Flowers, Maggie Janet. The mosaics of Monreale: A study of their monastic and funerary context (1994). University of Illinois
- Thomas Dittelbach. Rex Imago Christi: Der Dom von Monreale – Bildsprache und Zeremoniell in Mosaikkunst und Architektur (2003)
- Sulamith Brodbeck. Les saints de la cathédrale de Monreale en Sicile. Iconographie, hagiographie et pouvoir royal à la fin du XIIe siècle. Rome : École française de Rome, 2010. ISBN 978-2-7283-0864-4
