= Menodora, Metrodora, and Nymphodora =

Catholic Saints & Martyrs

Saints Menodora, Metrodora, and Nymphodora
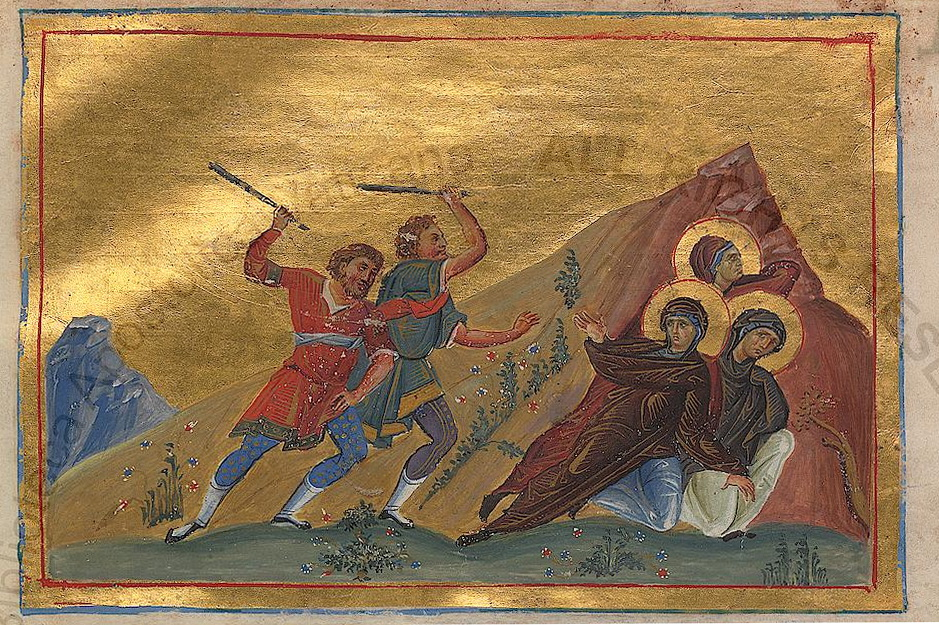
- Menodora, Metrodora, and Nymphodora are beaten to death by Frontonus' men. Miniature from the menologium of Basil II, 985 AD

Martyrs
- Born: Bithynia in Asia Minor (modern-day Anatolia, Turkey)
- Died: c. AD 305–311; Asia Minor (modern-day Turkey)
- Venerated in: Catholic Church; Eastern Orthodox Church
- Canonized: Pre-Congregation
- Feast: September 10 or September 23

Menodora, Metrodora, and Nymphodora (died c. AD 305–311) are virgin martyrs who were allegedly beaten to death by pagans for refusing to renounce their faith. They are venerated by the Roman Catholic and Eastern Orthodox churches. Their feast day is celebrated September 10 or September 23.

== Legend ==
According to tradition, Menodora, Metrodora, and Nymphodora were sisters from the ancient region of Bithynia in Anatolia. The women did not to marry— instead they retained their virginity and left civilization to live alone in the wilderness, spending their days praying, spreading the word of God, and fasting. They have been alternately described as living in the desert or on a mountain. Word spread about the sisters, as they were reputed to be able to heal the sick through prayer. The news reached Frontonus, the pagan governor (proconsul) of Bithynia, who ordered the sisters to be arrested and brought before him.

Frontonus attempted to get the sisters to renounce their faith by promising them rewards; however, the women steadfastly refused. The governor was angered, and decided to have his subordinates torture Menodora, the eldest of the sisters. She was stripped of her clothing and beaten until she passed; her dead body was then used by Frontonus in an attempt to scare the remaining sisters into renouncing their faith. However, they again refused, and Metrodora was then beaten to death. Nymphodora was beaten to death when she once again refused Frontonus's offers and refused to be swayed by the dead bodies of her sisters.

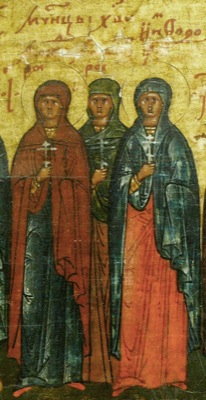
An icon from the early 17th century depicting the three saints

Frontonus then ordered for the women's bodies to be burned. However, during the event, a storm rolled in. Heavy rain extinguished the flames and a bolt of lighting struck and killed Frontonus and his servant. Christians took the martyrs' bodies and buried them near the warm springs of Bithynia.

== Relics ==
Some of their relics are preserved in the Protection cathedral of the Russian St. Panteleimon monastery on Mount Athos. Metrodora's hand is at the monastery of the Pantocrator.
