= Healing the royal official's son =

Miracle carried out by Jesus according to the Bible

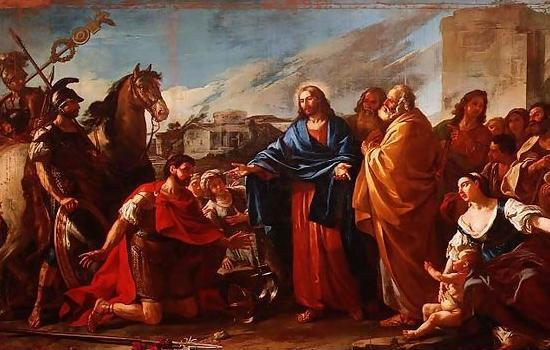
Healing the royal official's son by Joseph-Marie Vien, 1752

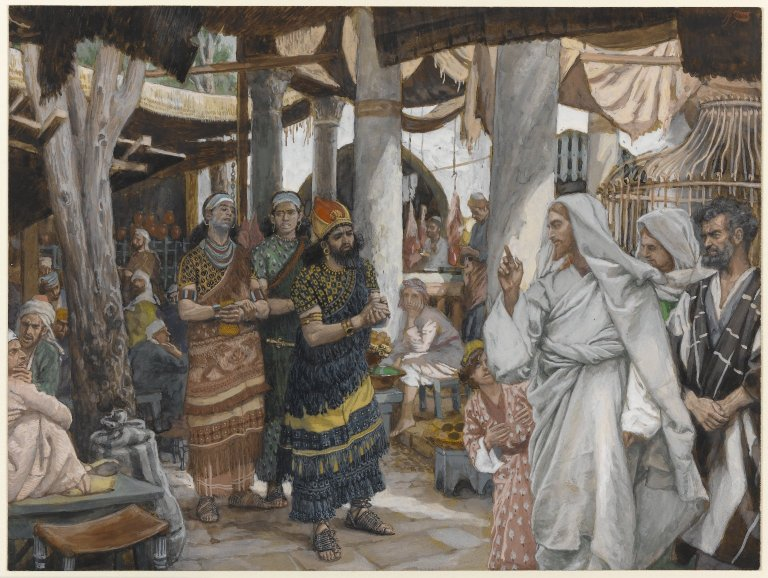
James Tissot: The Healing of the Officer's Son

Healing the royal official's son is one of the miracles of Jesus that appears in the Gospel of John (John 4, John 4:46–54). This episode takes place at Cana, though the royal official's son is some distance away, at Capernaum.

In the Gospel of John (NIV):

"Unless you people see signs and wonders," Jesus told him, "you will never believe."

The royal official said, "Sir, come down before my child dies."

"Go," Jesus replied, "your son will live."

The man took Jesus at his word and departed. While he was still on the way, his servants met him with the news that his boy was living. When he inquired as to the time when his son got better, they said to him, "Yesterday, at one in the afternoon, the fever left him."

Then the father realized that this was the exact time at which Jesus had said to him, "Your son will live". So he and his whole household believed.

== Commentary ==
The official, based in Capernaum, may have been in service to either the tetrarch Herod Antipas or the emperor. It is not clear whether he is a Jew or Gentile.

The healing of the official's son follows Jesus' conversation with the Samaritan woman regarding "a spring of water welling up to eternal life” and serves as a prelude to Jesus' statement when questioned after healing the paralytic at the Pool of Bethesda on the Sabbath, "For just as the Father raises the dead and gives life, so also does the Son give life to whomever he wishes."

A similar episode appears in Matthew 8:5–13 and Luke 7:1–10, where a Centurion's slave / servant is healed. While Fred Craddock treats these as the same miracle, R.T. France considers them separate events. Mark Goodacre and Hugo Mendez view the episode in John as the author’s adaption of the story found in Matthew and Luke.
