= Jesus healing an infirm woman =

Miracle carried out by Jesus according to the Bible

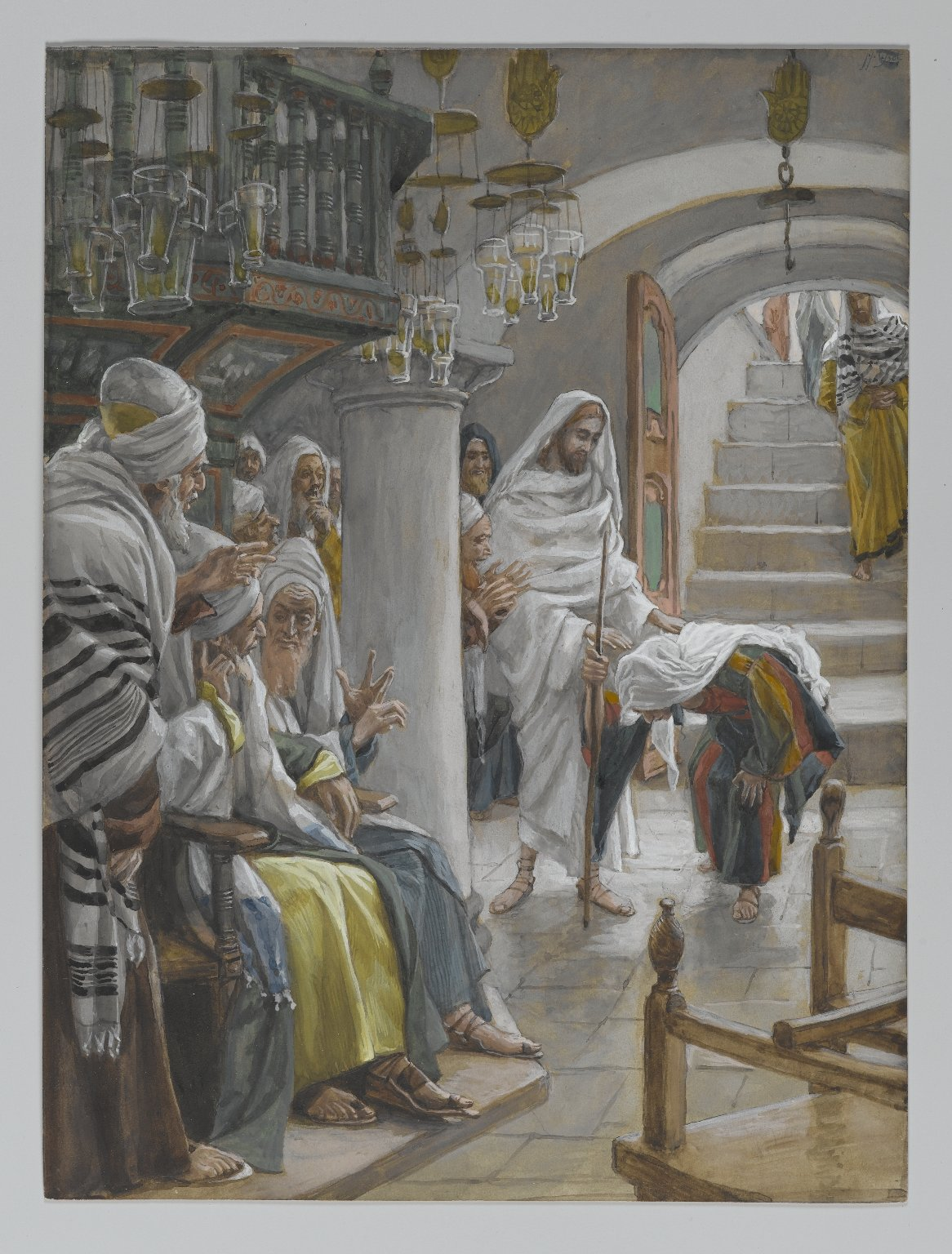
Christ healing an infirm woman by James Tissot, 1886–1896

Jesus healing an infirm woman is one of the miracles of Jesus in the Gospels (Luke 13:10-17).

== Biblical accounts ==
According to the Gospel, Jesus was teaching in one of the synagogues on Sabbath, and a woman was there who had been crippled by a spirit for eighteen years. She was bent over and could not straighten up at all. When Jesus saw her, he called her forward and said to her:

"Woman, you are set free from your infirmity."

Then he put his hands on her, and immediately she straightened up and praised God.

Indignant because Jesus had healed on Sabbath, the synagogue ruler said to the people, "There are six days for work. So come and be healed on those days, not on the Sabbath."

Jesus answered him:

"You hypocrites! Doesn't each of you on the Sabbath untie his ox or donkey from the stall and lead it out to give it water? Then should not this woman, a daughter of Abraham, whom Satan has kept bound for eighteen long years, be set free on the Sabbath day from what bound her?"

When he said this, all his opponents were humiliated, but the people were delighted with all the wonderful things he was doing.

== Commentary ==
Jesus's reply appeals to accepted Sabbath custom. The Mishnah permitted leading animals out to be watered on the Sabbath (m. Shabbat 5:1–4; 15:1–2; m. Eruvin 2:1–4), whereas the Qumran community's Damascus Document (CD 11:13–14) forbade even assisting an animal that day. Arguing from the lesser case to the greater, Jesus contends that if an animal may receive basic care on the Sabbath, how much more should "a daughter of Abraham" be released from her bondage on it. Jesus takes the initiative in calling the woman over, a notable gesture in a setting that commonly kept women at the margins of synagogue life, and by naming her "a daughter of Abraham" he accords her standing as a full member of the covenant people rather than merely an anonymous sufferer.

Cornelius a Lapide comments that the woman "crippled by a spirit" shows "that diseases are often sent by the devils, through the permission of God, for sins or other reasons." This agrees with verse 16 which states, that the woman "Satan had kept bound for eighteen long years." In the same manner the devil afflicted Job with various diseases (Job 2, see also Ps. 78:49). He further writes that, "the devil, therefore, made this woman crooked and bent, to compel her always to look down upon the earth." A modern commentator similarly notes that Luke ascribes the condition to a "spirit" rather than to natural aging, presenting it as bondage to a hostile spiritual agent; the physical condition itself has been identified medically as a form of spinal fusion or muscular paralysis.

John McEvilly writes that the verb "loosed" (gk: λύω) is used in this passage because previously her sinews and muscles had been contracted, while after the cure, "immediately she was straight", and the curvature was gone. Thus she assumed the natural straightness of her body.

Kenneth E. Bailey observes a wordplay in Jesus's response: the verb used for "set free" is the ordinary word for untying an animal, so that Jesus sets his opponents' readiness to "untie" an ox or donkey on the Sabbath against his own act of "untying" a woman bound for eighteen years. Luke concludes that Jesus's adversaries "were put to shame".

The laying on of hands is reported in Luke's Gospel only here and at Luke 4:40, a gesture understood to signal Jesus's compassionate identification with the sufferer.

Within the structure of Luke's Gospel the episode opens a stretch (Luke 13:10–14:24) organized as two parallel units, each beginning with a Sabbath healing, the other being the healing of the man with dropsy in Luke 14:1–6; together they develop the theme of the reversal of conventional expectations about the kingdom of God. The account is also one of several passages distinctive to Luke that pair or foreground women alongside men.

== Gallery ==
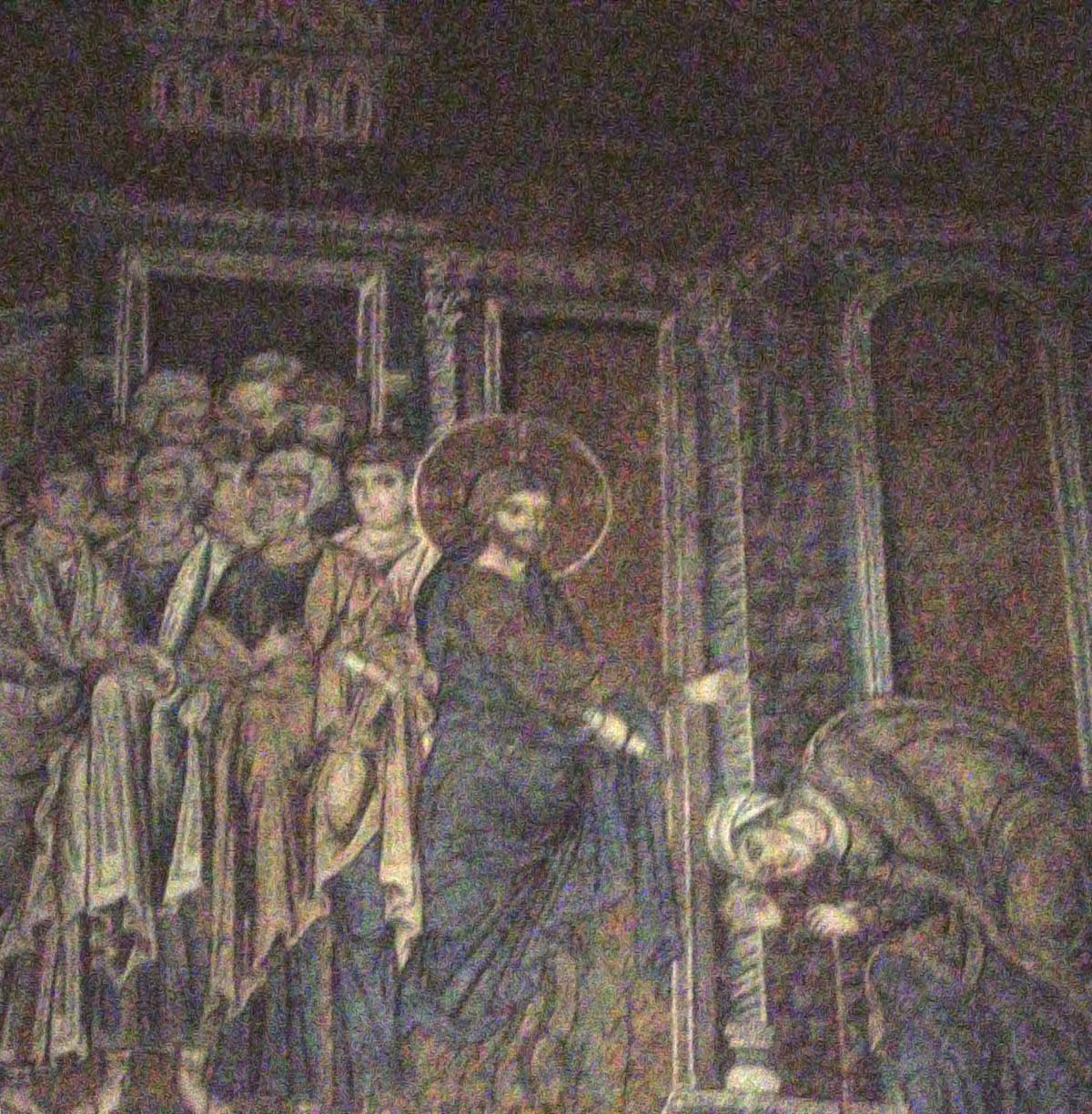
Christ heals the hunchback woman, Monreale Cathedral

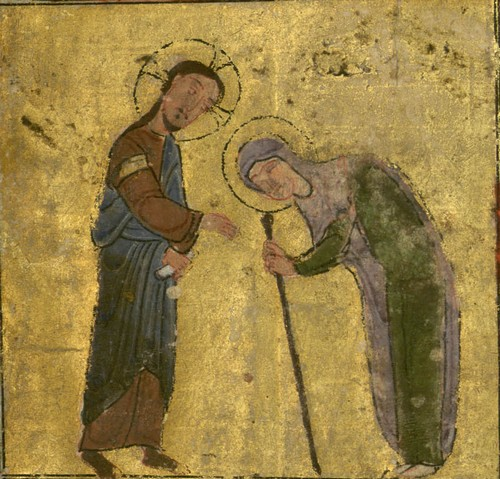
Healing the infirm woman, from a Coptic-Arab evangelary

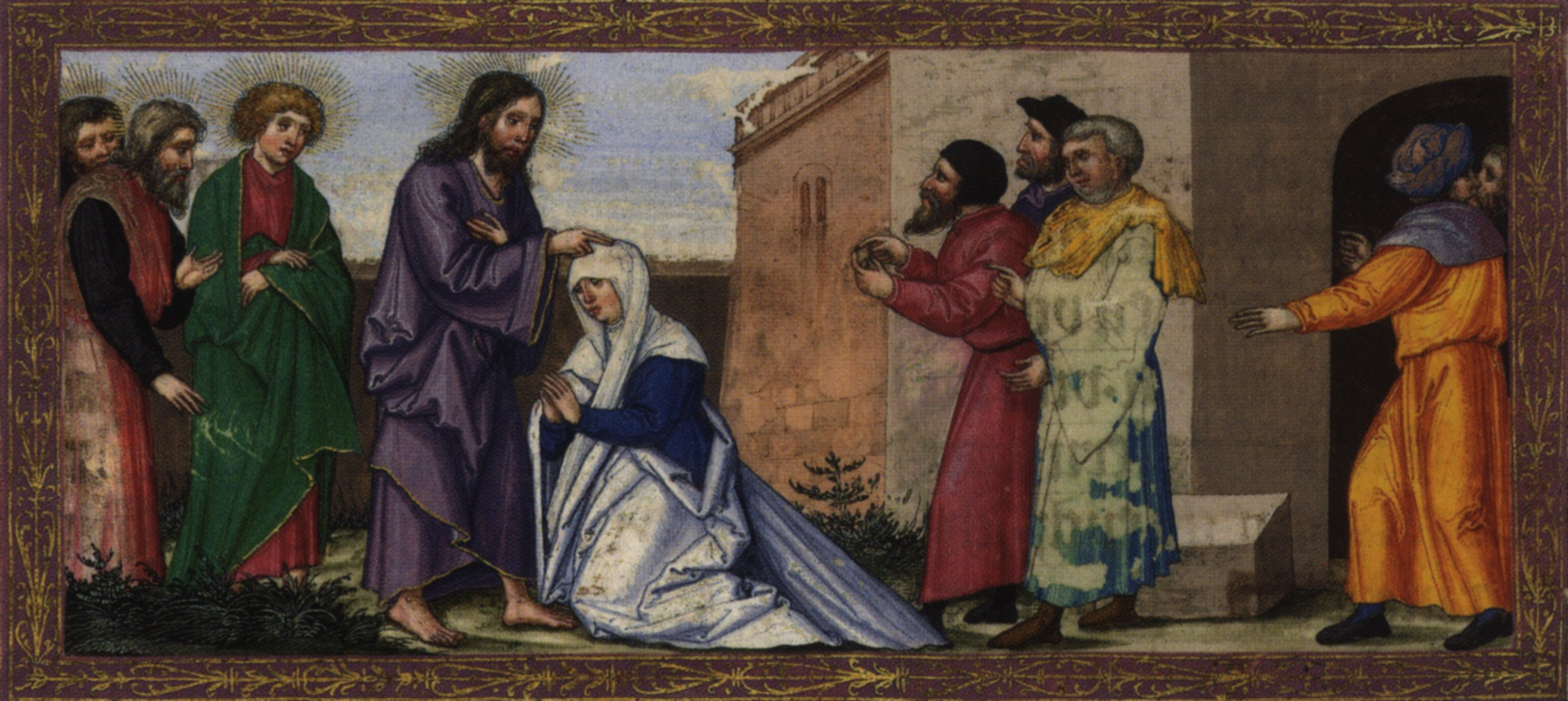
Healing a woman on the Sabbath, from the Ottheinreich Bible

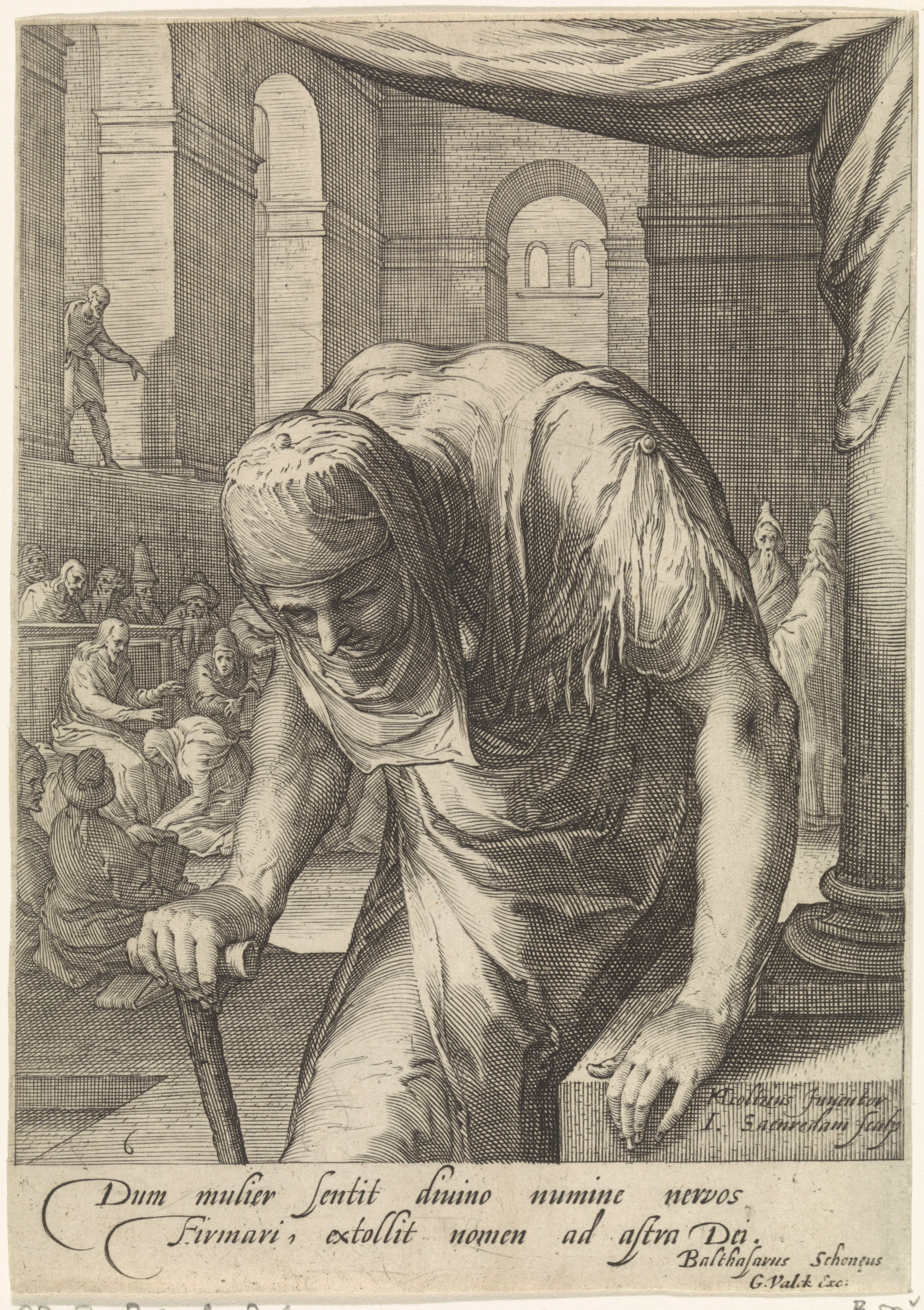
The infirm woman, by Jan Saenredam

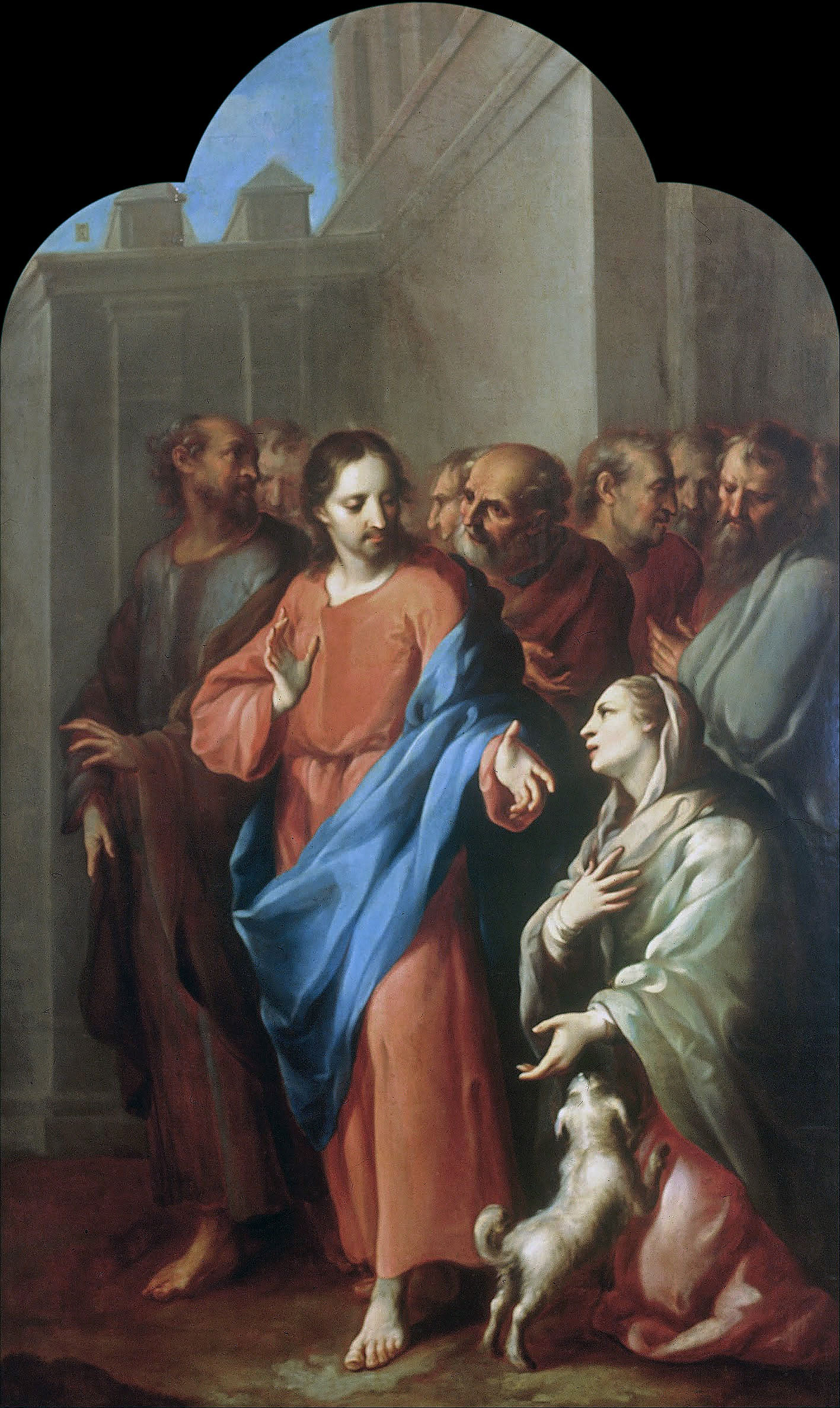
Juan Rodríguez Juárez, Jesus with the Sick Woman

== See also ==
- Life of Jesus in the New Testament
- Ministry of Jesus
- Parables of Jesus
