= Christ Driving the Money Changers from the Temple (El Greco, New York) =

Christian art painting by El Greco

Purification of the Temple
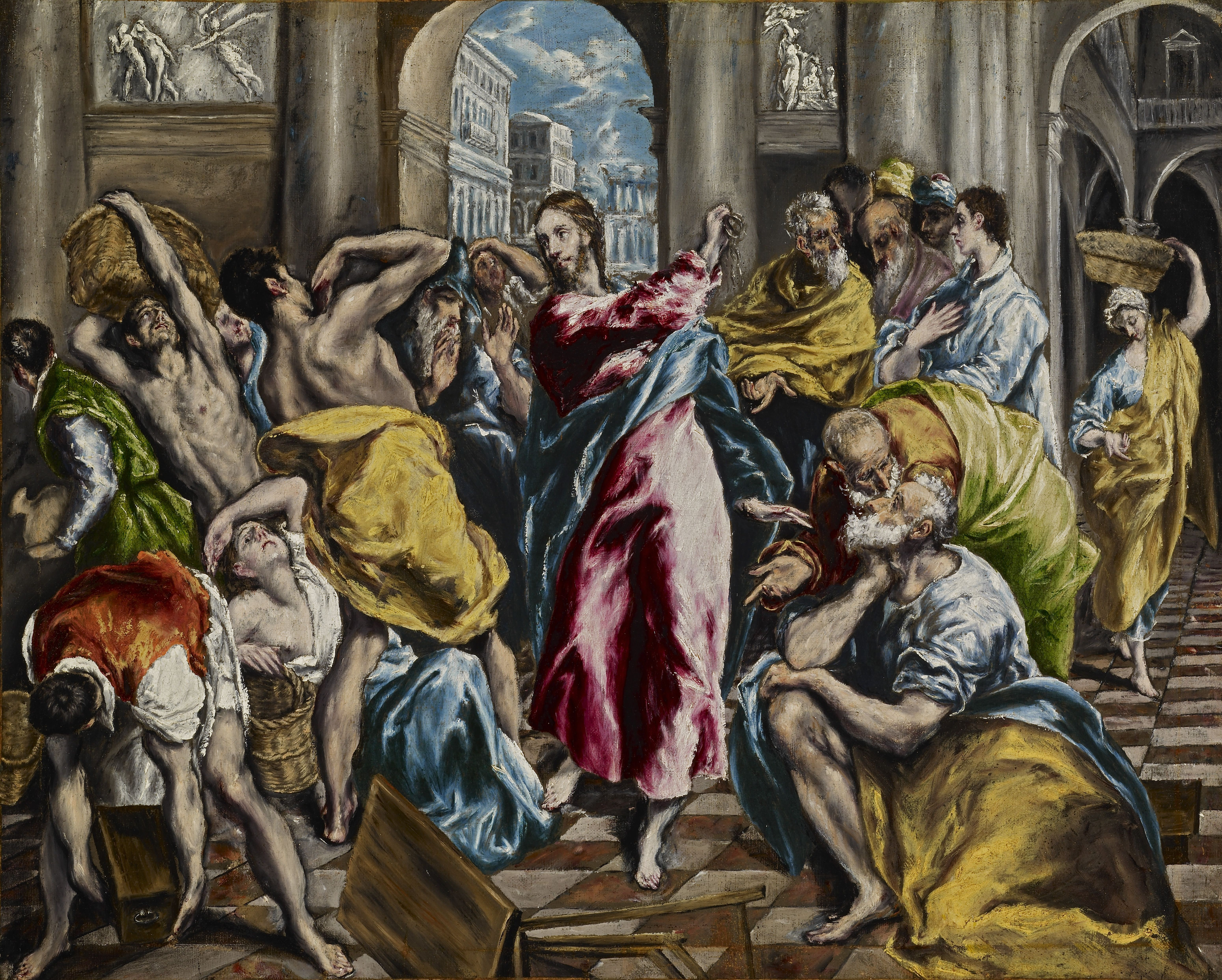
- Artist: El Greco
- Year: 1600
- Medium: Oil on canvas
- Dimensions: 42 cm × 52 cm (17 in × 20 in)
- Location: Frick Collection, New York City

Christ Driving the Money Changers from the Temple also referred to as The Cleansing of the Temple and The Purification of the Temple is a 1595–1600 Christian art painting by El Greco, now on exhibit in the Frick Collection in New York City. It depicts the Cleansing of the Temple, an event in the Life of Christ. This version of Christ Driving the Money Changers from the Temple was painted approximately four years before his death in 1614. It is thought to be one of his last major works during his many prolific years in Toledo, Spain. This theme consumed El Greco during his career as evidenced by the numerous versions of the painting still on display throughout the world.

The Cleansing of the Temple is considered to be one of El Greco's best-known religious paintings. Three other copies of the painting exist and a faithful reproduction is on display in the National Gallery in London. The London version has recently been deemed as authentic by scholars in the field of visual arts. Two versions and another on loan from Madrid are titled Purification of the Temple. The version at the National Gallery in Washington is called Christ Cleansing the Temple and is considered to be the original version. The church that serves as the backdrop in this scene is located in Madrid's Saint Gines Church. El Greco was exploring his work in the background architecture as well as the biblical meaning of this subject matter.

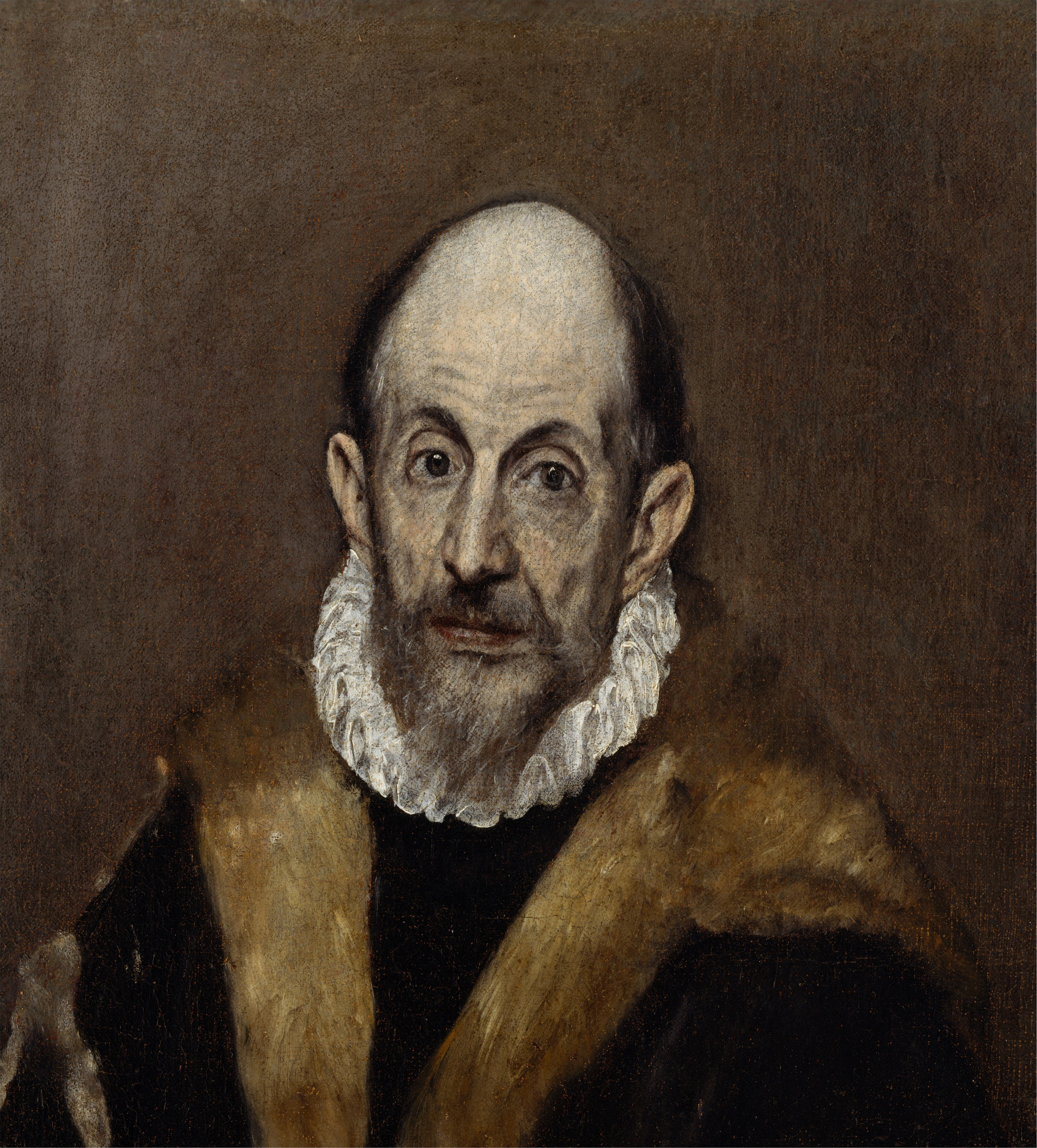
El Greco, self portrait, 1595–1560

== The artist ==
The artist, nicknamed El Greco, was born Domenikos Theotokopoulos on the island of Crete in Greece. He immersed himself and trained as a youth studying icons during his childhood and became an icon painter in the Eastern Orthodox tradition and the Byzantine style. He became known as El Greco after moving to Italy in 1567, spending time in Venice and Rome. In Venice, Titian and Tintoretto exposed him to the rich colors and sketchy painting manner. The dramatic, agitated state of this painting was directly influenced by the works of Tintoretto. He finally settled in Spain in 1577. His style of painting exuded radiance, inner light, ethereal form and daring colors appeared to be depicting spirit as well as the human experience.

== Mannerism ==
All versions of this religious theme are painted in El Greco's unique style of Mannerist painting. This particular style of painting features elongated figures, a dark and dramatic use of daring colors and an austere edge characteristic of Spanish painting in the 16th century. Jesus' figure is especially elongated as well as the kneeling figure to the right of him, this figure would be unnaturally tall if standing upright. In Mannerism space is compressed, colors are unusual and images are not portrayed in a realistic manner. This style is more subjective, showcasing intellect rather than nature.

== Historical context ==
The main subject, The Cleansing of the Temple, was a common theme during the time of the purification of the Roman Catholic Church. This event was described in the bible, Mark 11:15-19. It is historically accepted as an important event. El Greco was deeply involved with the religious environment in the city of Toledo, Spain. He became an important representative of Spanish mysticism and its followers.

== Description and Subject ==
=== Subject matter and biblical references ===
The topic of Christ expelling the merchants from the temple became a very popular and common theme in the New Testament of the Bible due to the attempt at the cleansing of the church through the Counter-Reformation period. This period was in response to the Protestant Reformation, as the Council of Trent sought to purify the practices of the church which resulted in fanaticism and zealots. The scene takes place in the porch of the Temple. The temple housed a market which included the sale of livestock and a money changer facility. According to James F. McGrath, the animal sales were related to temple sacrifices and the money changers' task was to convert numerous currencies into the accepted currency to pay temple taxes. El Greco painted this scene in at least four paintings that are well known and currently on display.

The Purification or the Cleansing of the Temple is a common narrative that tells the story of how Christ and his disciples, before the Jewish Passover went to Jerusalem to visit the Temple. The Cleansing or Purification of the Temple, occurs in all four Gospels: Matthew 21:12–17; Mark 11:15–19; Luke 19:45–48; and John 2:13–16. As he encounters the merchants in the holy and sacred place and upon seeing the merchants, money changers and the consumers he angrily drove them from the temple. The temple courtyard was filled with livestock (sheep, oxen, doves), merchants, tables of money changers. He was so angered, he overturned the money tables, drove out all the animals and said that they had turned the temple into a "den of thieves" and "a house of trade". Jesus declared that "my house shall be called a house of prayer, but you have made it a "den of thieves".Although there are many other elements in this piece, Christ remains the key figure, appearing to be punishing the traders with his right hand and reassuring the apostles with his left hand. Also visible in the painting are the depiction of two stone bas-reliefs on either side of the archway. These have very important significance to the subject matter in the painting. They allude to the two themes of punishment and redemption. The relief on the left highlights The Expulsion of Adam and Eve from Paradise which mirrors he expulsion of the merchants from the Temple. The relief on the right shows the Sacrifice of Abraham's Son Isaac, which foretells the crucifixion of Christ.

== Painting composition and elements ==
A minimalist composition, this painting focuses on the central figure of Christ. He is the only figure in red and is separate from the others in the scene, they are all swirling around him as he seems to be striding forward. Christ is painted as a more imposing figure, exemplifying the technique of hierarchical scale where important figures appear larger. In fact, all the figures are painted larger than life, especially St. Peter. It was a common practice in Christian art to highlight the significance of Christ. The figure is very much highly charged and hypnotic and of El Greco's style, which was characterized by distorted and elongated figures. Christ is also isolated by the strong highlights and black shadows in the painting. There are no images of the sacrificial oxen, sheep or doves. The merchants are placed on the left of the painting, the apostles are seen on the right. The money changers' depiction has been reduced to a few terrified and frightened sinners and one single person trying to take away the coins in fear.

El Greco's influences came from multiple sources, trained in the Byzantine tradition, he specifically used elements of elongated forms and the flattened plane of view. Secondly, his later knowledge of Venetian Altarpieces and experience with Venetian painting from his time in Venice had an impact.

== Other versions of the Purification of the Temple ==
There are at least three known paintings in addition to the version in The Frick Collection, New York.

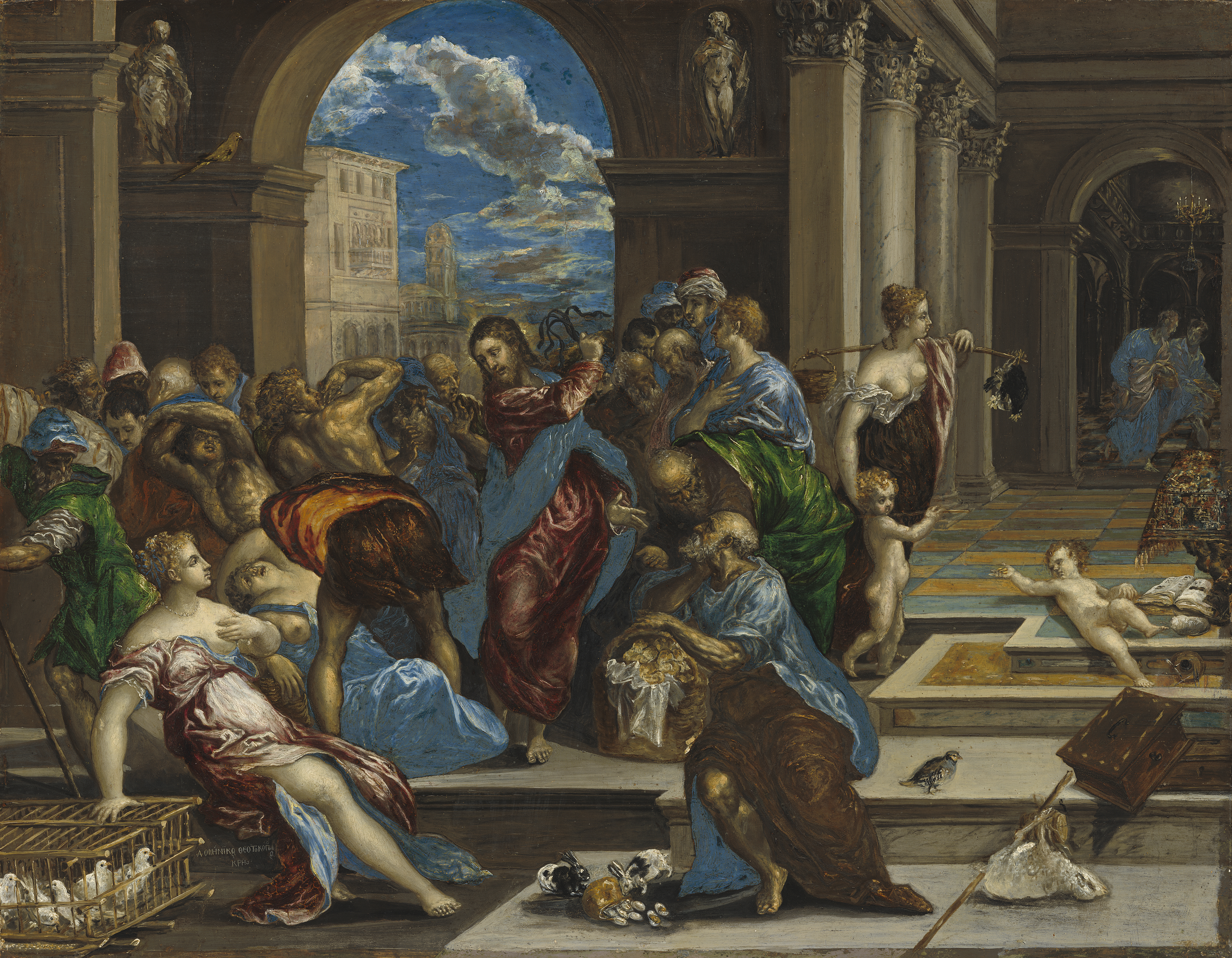
El Greco, Christ Cleansing the Temple, National Gallery of Art, Washington, D.C.

Christ Cleansing the Temple is on exhibit in the National Gallery of Art in Washington, D.C. This version was painted in Venice and the influence of the Venetian masters in this work is very telling. He depicts more movement and drama and the elaborate detail of the architecture as well.

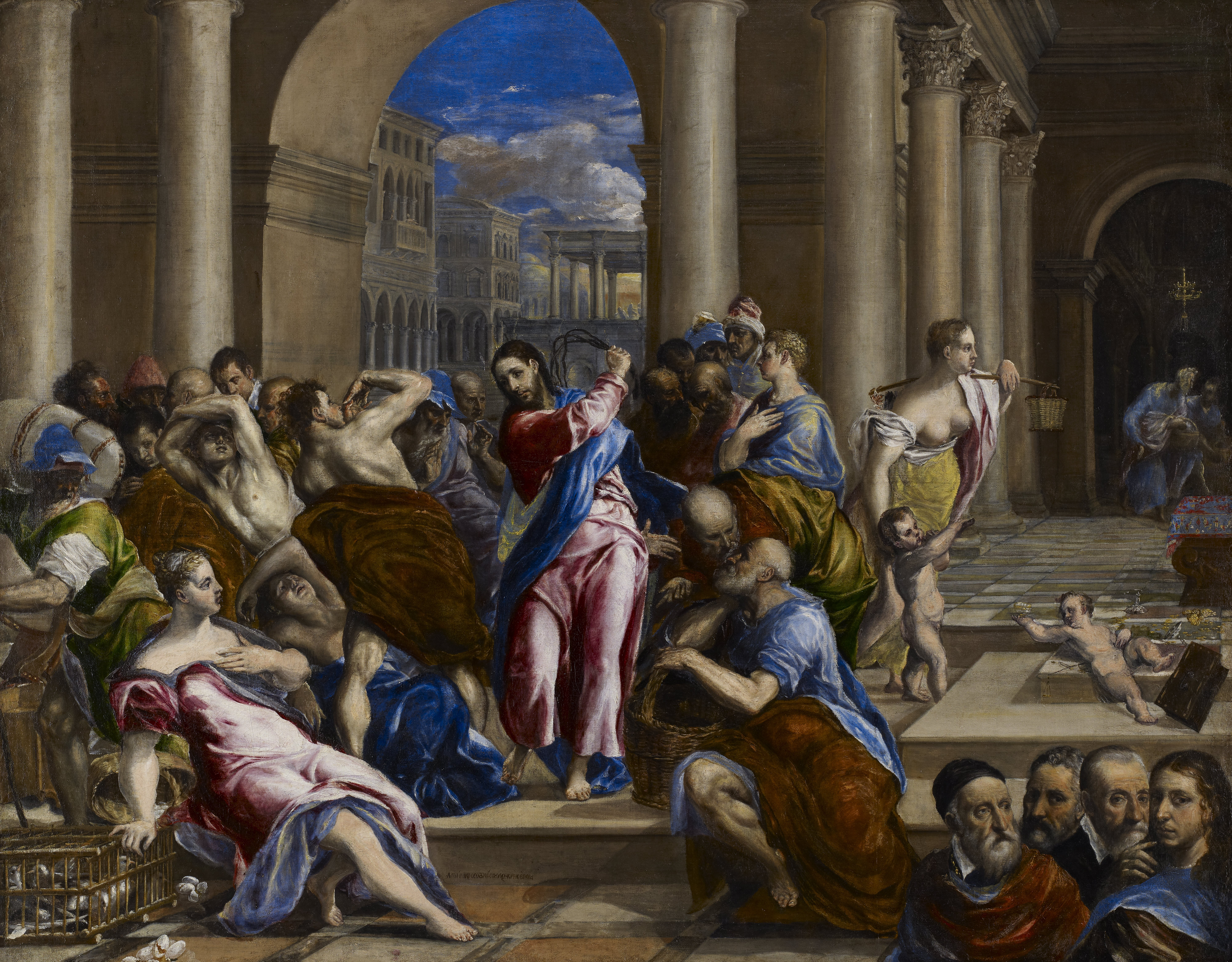
El Greco, Christ Driving the Money Changers from the Temple, The Minneapolis Institute of Art, Minnesota

The Minneapolis Institute of Art Collection houses another version of the painting called Christ Driving the Money Changers from The Temple. In this particular painting he painted in the lower right corner, four of his contemporaries: Titian, Michelangelo, Giulio Clovio (a miniaturist and manuscript illuminator), and Raphael.

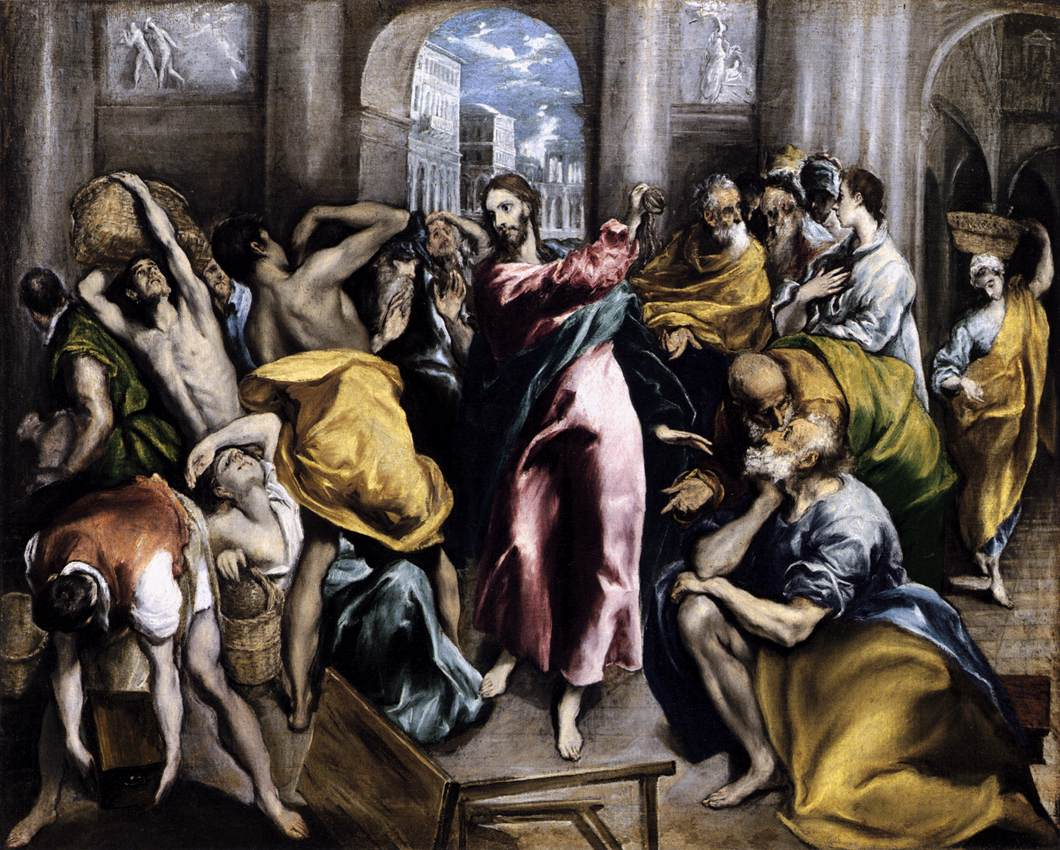
El Greco - The Purification of the Temple, National Gallery of Art, London, England

The version in the National Gallery of Art in London quite resembles the present Frick Collection version; the structure and layout is similar, as is the dynamism. All the major figures and poses look to be the same, the floor looks to be the only difference aside from the darkness of this version.

== See also ==
- List of works by El Greco
