= Christ Driving the Money Changers from the Temple (El Greco, Madrid) =

1609 painting by El Greco

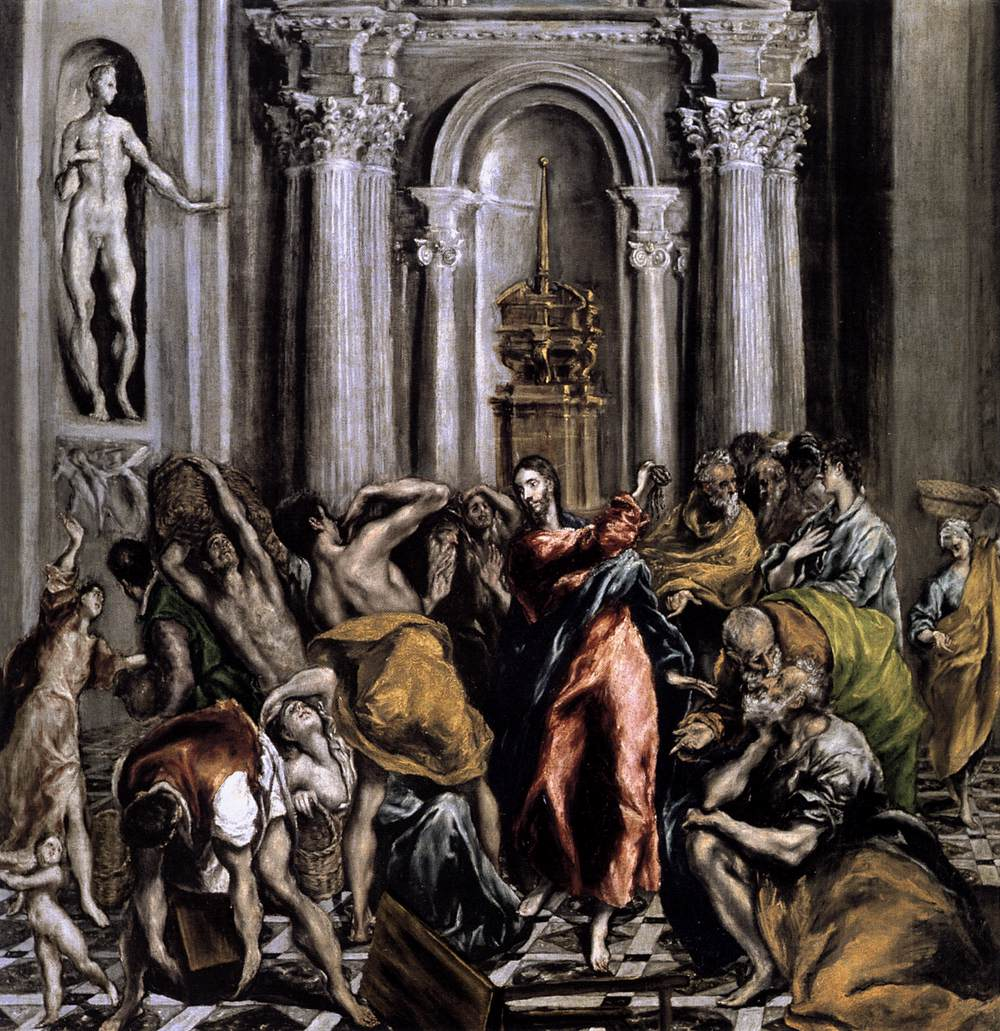
- Artist: El Greco
- Year: 1609
- Medium: Oil on canvas
- Dimensions: 106 cm × 104 cm (42 in × 41 in)
- Location: Church of San Ginés, Madrid

Christ Driving the Money Changers from the Temple is a 1609 Christian art painting by El Greco, now in the church of San Ginés in Madrid. It depicts the Cleansing of the Temple, an event in the Life of Christ.

There exist three other copies of the painting and also a faithful reproduction in the National Gallery in London, which has recently been considered as authentic by scholars in the field of visual arts. Two versions and that other on loan from Madrid are titled Purification of the Temple. The one at the National Gallery in Washington is called Christ Cleansing the Temple.

== See also ==
- List of works by El Greco
