= Cleansing of the Temple =

Event in the ministry of Jesus

Christ Driving the Money Changers from the Temple (El Greco, Washington D.C.)

In all four canonical gospels of the Christian New Testament, the cleansing of the Temple narrative tells of Jesus expelling the merchants and the money changers from the Temple in Jerusalem.

In this account Jesus and his disciples travel to Jerusalem for Passover, where Jesus expels the merchants and consumers from the temple, accusing them of turning it into "a den of thieves" (in the synoptic Gospels) and "a market" (in the Gospel of John) through their commercial activities.

Most historians agree that an actual event took place, although some scholars believe that the accounts refer to two separate incidents. The scene is a common motif in Christian art.

== Description ==
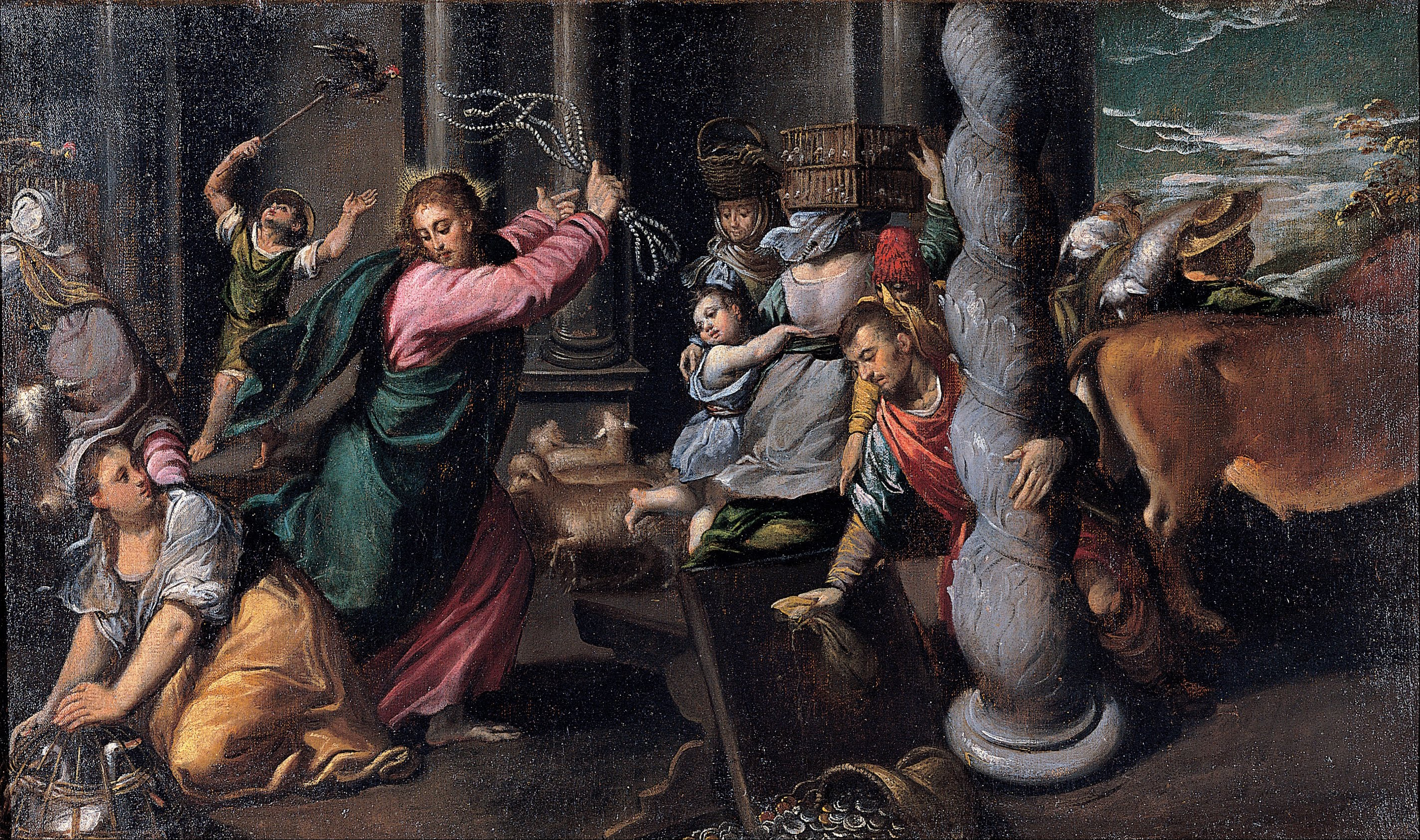
Driving of the Merchants From the Temple by Scarsellino

In the narrative Jesus is stated to have visited the Second Temple in Jerusalem, where the courtyard was described as being filled with livestock, merchants and the tables of money changers, who changed the standard Greek and Roman money for Jewish and Tyrian shekels. Jerusalem was packed with Jews who had come for Passover. According to the AD 66 census by Cestius, as cited by Josephus, the attendees at the Passover Festival were counted as more than 2.5 million pilgrims.

And when he had made a scourge of small cords, he drove them all out of the temple, and the sheep, and the oxen; and poured out the changers' money, and overthrew the tables; And said unto them that sold doves, Take these things hence; make not my Father's house a house of merchandise.

— John 2:15–16, King James Version

And Jesus went into the temple of God, and cast out all them that sold and bought in the temple, and overthrew the tables of the money changers, and the seats of them that sold doves, And said unto them, It is written, My house shall be called the house of prayer; but ye have made it a den of thieves.

— Matthew 21:12–13, King James Version

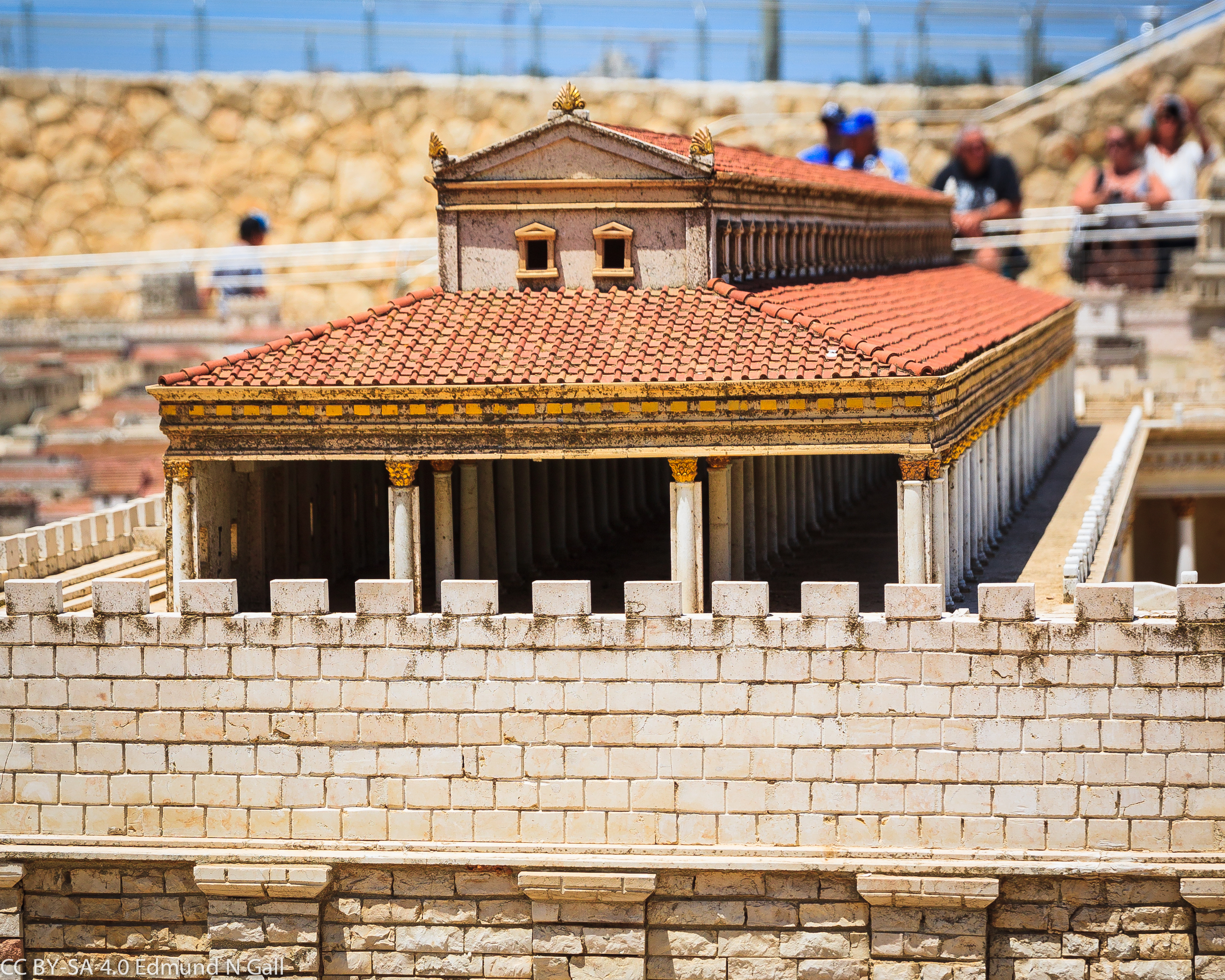
The Royal Stoa in Herod's Temple, where the cleansing of the Temple would have taken place, as imagined in the Holyland Model of Jerusalem

In Mark 12:40 and Luke 20:47 Jesus accuses the Temple authorities of thieving and, in this instance, names poor widows as their victims, going on to provide evidence of this in Mark 12:42 and Luke 21:2. Doves were sold to be sacrificed by the poor who could not afford lambs as a sacrifice. According to Mark 11:16, Jesus then put an embargo on people carrying any merchandise through the Temple, a sanction which would have disrupted all commerce. This occurred in the outermost court, the Court of the Gentiles, which was where the buying and selling of animals took place.

Matthew 21:14–16 says the Temple leaders questioned Jesus, asking whether he was aware that children in the temple were shouting "Hosanna to the Son of David" in Jesus's praise. Jesus responded by saying, "From the lips of children and infants you have ordained praise." This phrase incorporates a phrase from the Psalm 8:2, "from the lips of children and infants," believed by followers to be an admission of divinity by Jesus.

== Old Testament background ==
Jesus's pronouncement and action in the temple draw on several texts from the Hebrew Bible. In the Synoptic accounts his words combine two prophetic passages: Isaiah 56:7 ("my house shall be called a house of prayer for all nations") and Jeremiah 7:11 ("a den of robbers"). John Nolland observes that in Jeremiah's original oracle the "robbers" are not the temple vendors but the worshippers themselves, whose conduct away from the temple makes a mockery of their worship within it: their part is "to collude in the state of affairs by facilitating the public worship of those whose lives assert something quite different from fidelity to God." On this reading the charge extends beyond commercial exploitation to a broader indictment of religious hypocrisy.

Ben Witherington III identifies further background for the Markan account in Zechariah 14:21 ("there shall no longer be a trader in the house of the Lord"), which he reads as the eschatological backdrop to Jesus's action, and in Malachi 3:1–5 ("The Lord whom you seek will suddenly come to his temple"), which supplies the motif of the Lord coming in purging judgment.

In John's account the disciples connect Jesus's action to Psalm 69:9 ("Zeal for your house will consume me"; John 2:17), which the narrative presents as foreshadowing that Jesus's consuming dedication to God's house would lead to his death.

== Chronology ==
There are debates about when the cleansing of the Temple occurred and whether there were two separate events.

The narrative occurs near the end of the Synoptic Gospels (at Matthew 21:12–17, Mark 11:15–19, and Luke 19:45–48) and near the start of the Gospel of John (at John 2:13–16). Ancient compositional practices involved such chronological displacement and compression, with even reliable biographers like Plutarch displaying them. While most historians agree that an actual event took place, some scholars believe that the accounts refer to two separate incidents, given that the Gospel of John also includes more than one Passover. Thomas Aquinas and Augustine of Hippo agree that Jesus performed a similar act twice, with the less severe denunciations of the Johannine account (merchants, sellers) occurring early in Jesus's public ministry and the more severe denunciations of the synoptic accounts (thieves, robbers) occurring just before, and indeed expediting, the events of the crucifixion of Jesus. Craig S. Keener makes the case explicitly: "Unless Jesus cleansed the temple twice, which is unlikely, it is impossible to harmonize John's chronology for cleansing the temple with that of the Synoptics"; he argues that John deliberately placed a single cleansing at the opening of Jesus' ministry so that "Jesus' entire ministry is the Passion Week, overshadowed by his impending 'hour.'"

Claims about the Temple cleansing episode in the Gospel of John can be combined with non-biblical historical sources to obtain an estimate of when it occurred. John 2:13 states that Jesus went to the Temple in Jerusalem around the start of his ministry and John 2:20 states that Jesus was told: "Forty and six years was this temple in building, and you want to raise it up in three days?"

In the Antiquities of the Jews the first-century Roman-Jewish historian Josephus wrote that (Ant 15.380) the temple reconstruction was started by Herod the Great in the 18th year of his reign 22 BC, two years before Augustus arrived in Syria in 20 BC to return the son of Phraates IV and receive in return the spoils and standards of three Roman legions (Ant 15.354). Temple expansion and reconstruction was ongoing, and it was in constant reconstruction until it was destroyed in AD 70 by the Romans. Given that it had taken 46 years of construction to that point, the Temple visit in the Gospel of John has been estimated at any time between AD 24 and 29. However, there is reason to think that the practice of selling in the Court of the Gentiles was only instituted in 30 AD by Caiaphas. This would mean that Jesus was reacting to a newly-instituted practice: the merchants would not have been there in previous years.

The tables would only have been there between Adar 25 and Nisan 1, in preparation for the passover. The temple tax had to be paid by every Jewish male before Nisan 1 (Ex. 30:11). This would mean that the timeline was compressed by the gospel writers.

== Historicity ==
Most scholars agree that it is "overwhelmingly probable that Jesus did something in the temple and said something about its destruction".

Given that desecration of a temple was seen as a capital offense by the Romans, Ben Witherington III says that "It is very unlikely that the early church, while involved in evangelism and seeking acceptance at all levels of society, would make up a tradition about Jesus performing some sort of violent action in the temple."

== Analysis ==
=== Challenge to authority ===
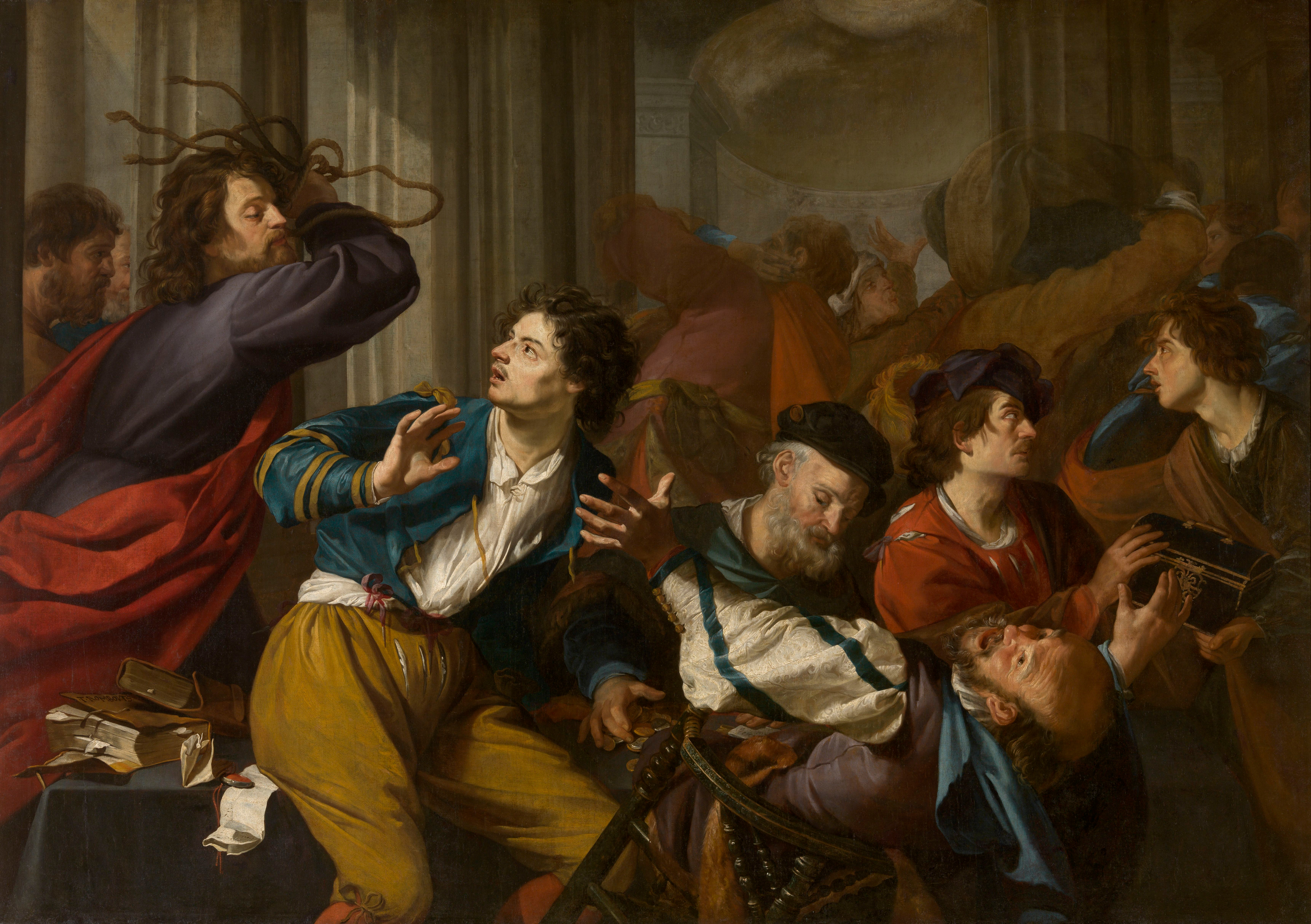
Christ Driving the Money changers from the Temple by Theodoor Rombouts

Professor David Landry of the University of St. Thomas says that "the importance of the episode is signalled by the fact that within a week of this incident, Jesus is dead. Matthew, Mark, and Luke agree that this is the event that functioned as the 'trigger' for Jesus' death."

According to D. A. Carson, the fact that Jesus was not arrested by the Temple guards was due to the fact that the crowd supported Jesus's actions. Maurice Casey agrees with this view, stating that the Temple's authorities were probably afraid that sending guards against Jesus and his disciples would cause a revolt and a carnage, while Roman soldiers in the Antonia Fortress did not feel the need to act for a minor disturbance such as this; he also says that Jesus's actions probably prompted the authorities' decision to have Jesus arrested some days later and later had him crucified by the Roman prefect Pontius Pilate.

=== Significance of money ===
Animal sales were related to selling animals for use in the animal sacrifices in the Temple. Money changers in the temple existed to convert the many currencies in use into the Jewish and Tyrian money accepted for paying the Temple taxes. Ben Witherington III further notes that the Tyrian shekels required for the temple tax bore the image of Herakles (Hercules) on one side and the inscription "Tyre the holy and invincible," and suggests that the presence of these overtly pagan coins and images within the temple precincts may have contributed to Jesus' objection to the money-changing operation.

A common interpretation is that Jesus was reacting to the practice of money changers routinely cheating the people, but Marvin L. Krier Mich says that a good deal of money was stored at the temple, where it could be loaned by the wealthy to the poor who were in danger of losing their land to debt. The Temple establishment therefore co-operated with the aristocracy in the exploitation of the poor. One of the first acts of the First Jewish-Roman War was the burning of the debt records in the archives.

=== Symbolic prophetic action ===
The scale of commerce in the temple precinct—the outer court covered roughly 35 acres and was packed with Passover pilgrims—made a complete physical expulsion of all merchants impossible within a brief episode.

Pope Francis saw the cleansing of the Temple not as a violent act but more of a prophetic demonstration. In addition to writing and speaking messages from God, Israelite or Jewish nevi'im ('spokespersons', 'prophets') often acted out prophetic actions in their life.. Ben Witherington III and Craig S. Keener agree that the action is a symbolic prophetic sign, a brief dramatic interruption sufficient to enact a prophetic declaration rather than a sustained physical takeover.

Sceptical scholars such as those in the Jesus Seminar as expressed in the book The Acts of Jesus (1998) cite the vastness of the temple complex to question the historicity of the episode, but feel Jesus "performed some anti-temple act and spoke some word against the temple".

John Dominic Crossan of the Jesus Seminar says that Jesus was not attempting to cleanse the Temple of any corruption. Instead, it was a radical protest against the institution of animal sacrifice, which gave people a false sense of transactional forgiveness compared to repentance. He believes these views aligned with John the Baptist and Jeremiah.

== Interpretation of John 2:15 ==
In 2012 Andy Alexis-Baker, clinical associate professor of theology at Loyola University Chicago, gave the history of the interpretation of the Johannine passage since Antiquity:

- Origen (3rd century) is the first to comment on the passage: he denies historicity and interprets it as metaphorical, where the Temple is the soul of a person freed from earthly things thanks to Jesus.
- On the contrary, John Chrysostom (c. 391) defended the historical authenticity of this passage, but if he considered that Jesus had used the whip against the merchants in addition to the other beasts, he specified that it was to show his divinity and that Jesus was not to be imitated.
- Theodore of Mopsuestia (in 381) – who answered, during the First Council of Constantinople, to the bishop Rabbula, accused of striking his clerics and to justify himself by the purification of the Temple – and Cosmas Indicopleustes (c. 550) supported that the event is non-violent and historical: Jesus whips sheep and bulls, but speaks only to merchants and only overturns their tables.
- Augustine of Hippo (in 387) referred to cleansing of the temple to justify rebuking others for their sinful behavior writing, "Stop those whom you can, restrain whom you can, frighten whom you can, allure gently whom you can, do not, however, rest silent."
- Pope Gregory VII (in 1075), quoting Pope Gregory I, relies on this passage to justify his policy against simoniacal clergy, comparing them to merchants. Other medieval Catholic figures will do the same, such as Bernard of Clairvaux, who justified the Crusades by claiming that fighting the "pagans" with the same zeal that Jesus displayed against the merchants was a way to salvation.
- During the Protestant Reformation, John Calvin (in 1554), in line with Augustine of Hippo and the Gregories, defended himself by using (among other things) the purification of the temple, when he was accused of having helped to burn alive Michael Servetus, a theologian who disputed the idea of the Holy Trinity.
- Andy Alexis-Baker indicates that, while the majority of English-speaking Bibles include humans, sheep and cattle in the whipping, the original text is more complex and, after grammatical analysis, concludes that the text does not describe a violent act of Jesus against the merchants.

== According to later sources ==
=== Toledot Yeshu ===
There are a number of later narratives of the incident that are generally regarded as legendary. One example is the Toledot Yeshu, a parody gospel probably first written about 1,000 years after Christ, but possibly dependent on second-century Jewish-Christian gospel and not oral traditions that might go back all the way to the formation of the canonical narratives themselves. The Toledot Yeshu claims that Yeshu had entered the Temple with 310 of his followers. That Christ's followers had indeed entered the Temple, and in fact the Holy of Holies, is also claimed by Epiphanius, who further claimed that James wore the breastplate of the high priest and the high priestly diadem on his head and actually entered the Holy of Holies, and that John the Beloved had become a sacrificing priest who wore the mitre, which was the headdress of the high priest.

Yeshu is likewise portrayed as robbing the shem hamephorash, the 'secret name of God' from the Holy of Holies, in the Toledot Yeshu.

== In art ==
The cleansing of the Temple is a commonly depicted event in the Life of Christ, under various titles.

El Greco painted several versions:

- Christ Driving the Money Changers from the Temple (El Greco, London)
- Christ Driving the Money Changers from the Temple (El Greco, Madrid)
- Christ Driving the Money Changers from the Temple (El Greco, Minneapolis)
- Christ Driving the Money Changers from the Temple (El Greco, New York)
- Christ Driving the Money Changers from the Temple (El Greco, Washington)

=== Gallery ===
Cleansing of the Temple. Unknown artist

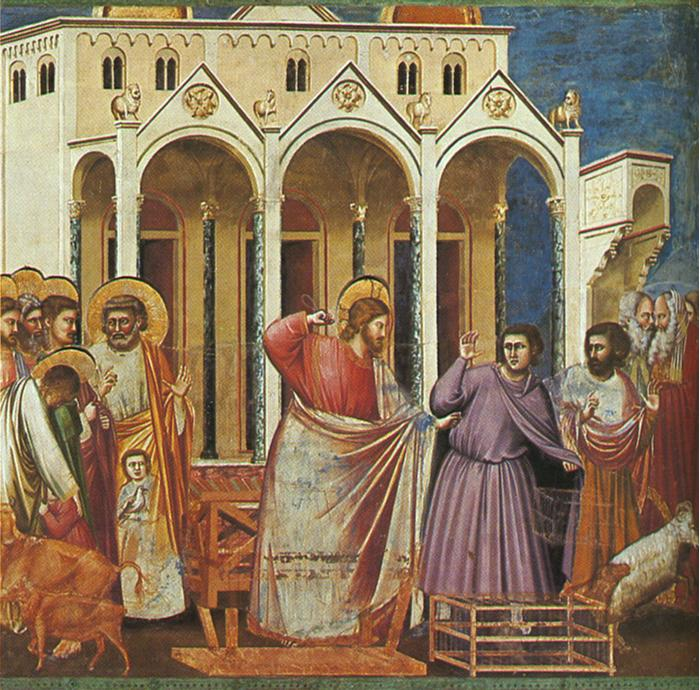
Casting out the money changers by Giotto

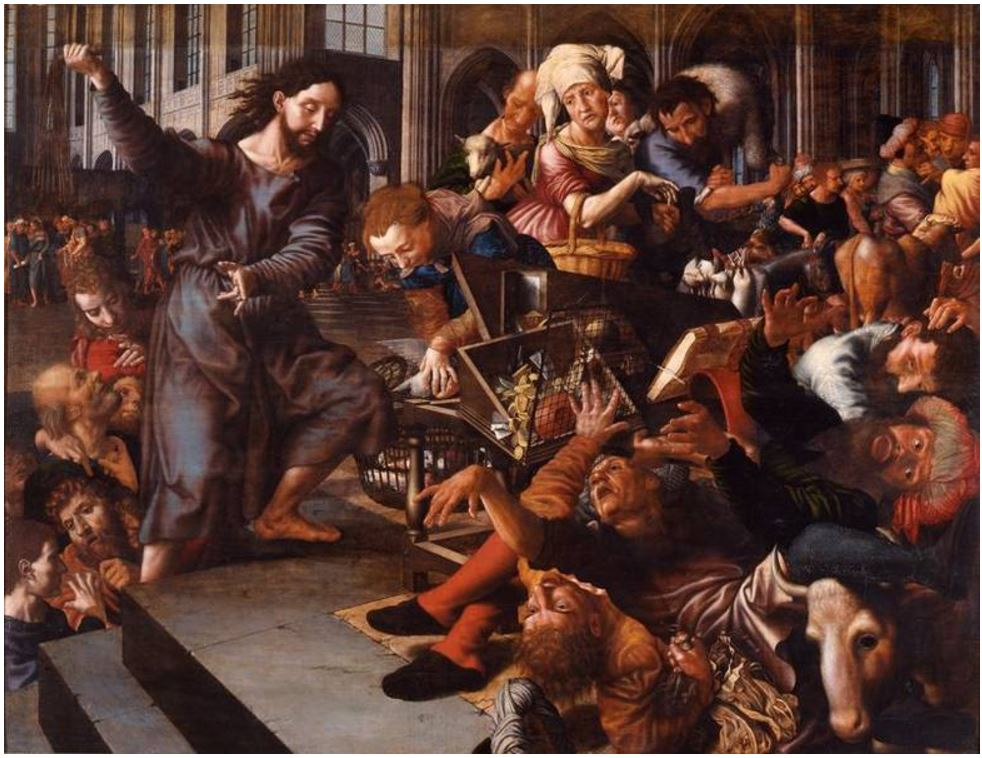
Christ driving the money changers from the temple by Jan Sanders van Hemessen

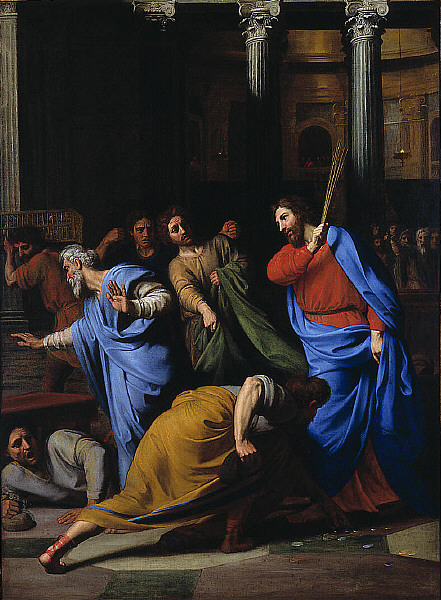
Christ Expelling the Money-Changers from the Temple by Nicolas Colombel

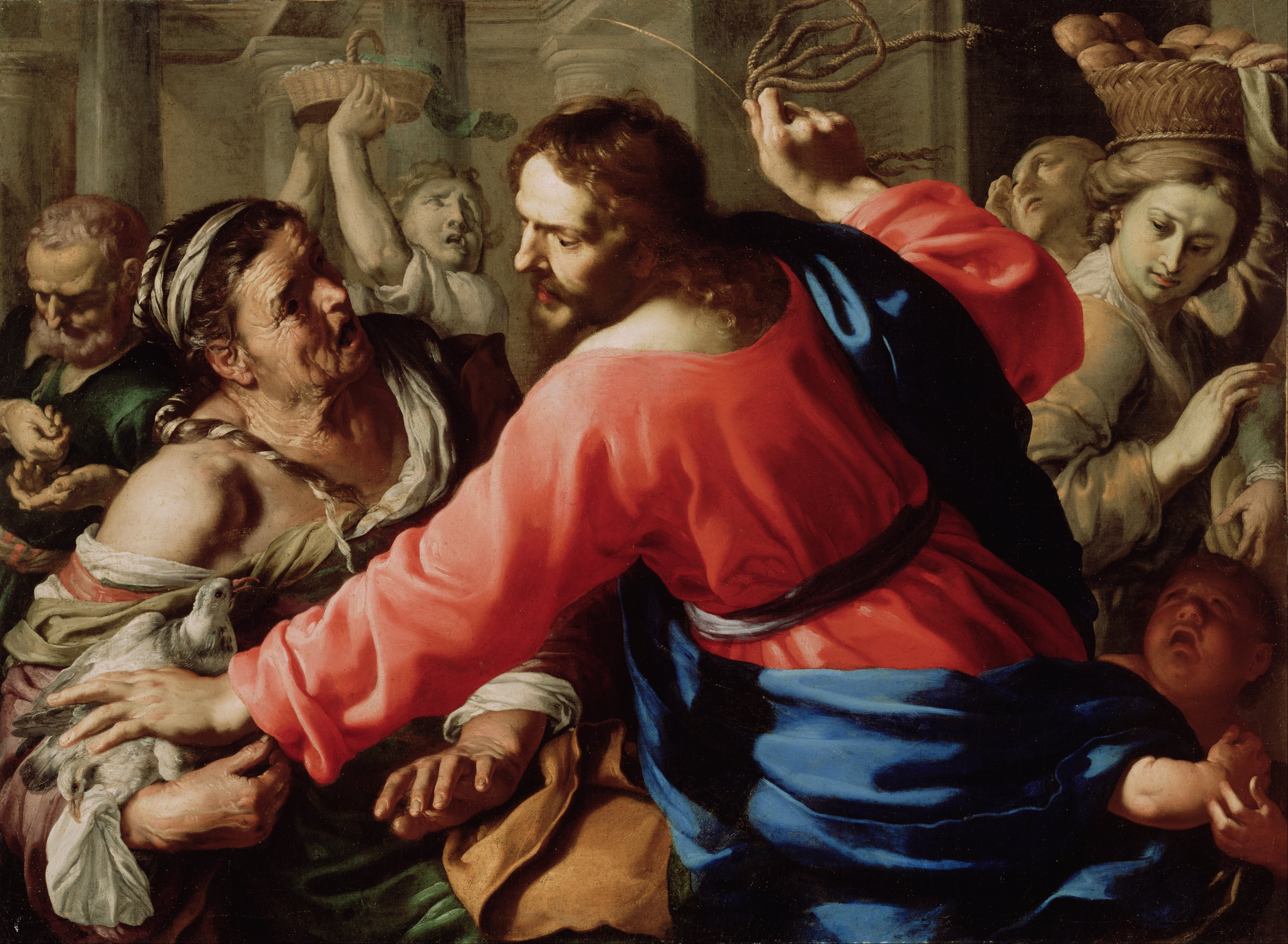
Christ Cleansing the Temple by Bernardino Mei

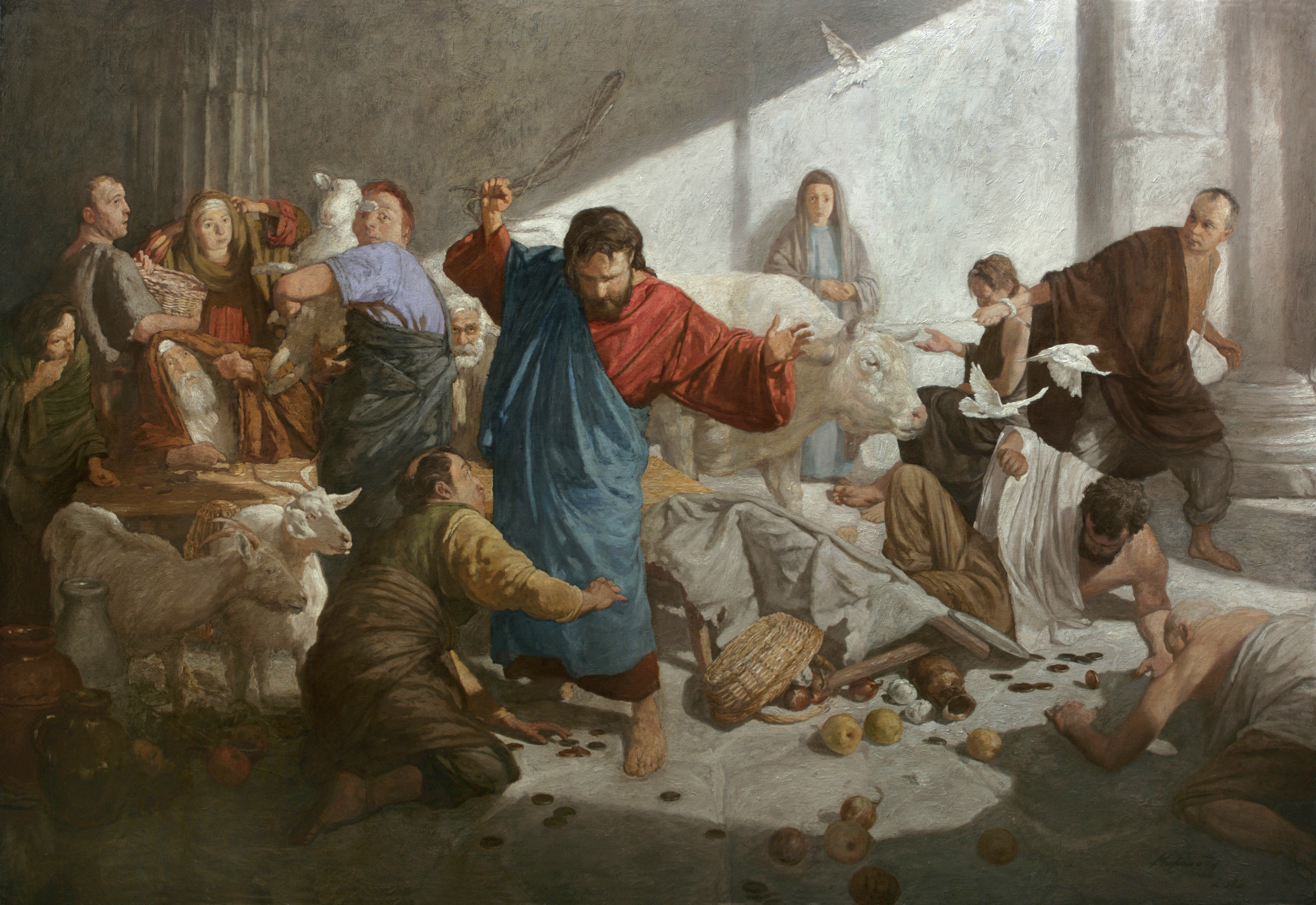
Expulsion of the merchants from the temple by Andrei Mironov

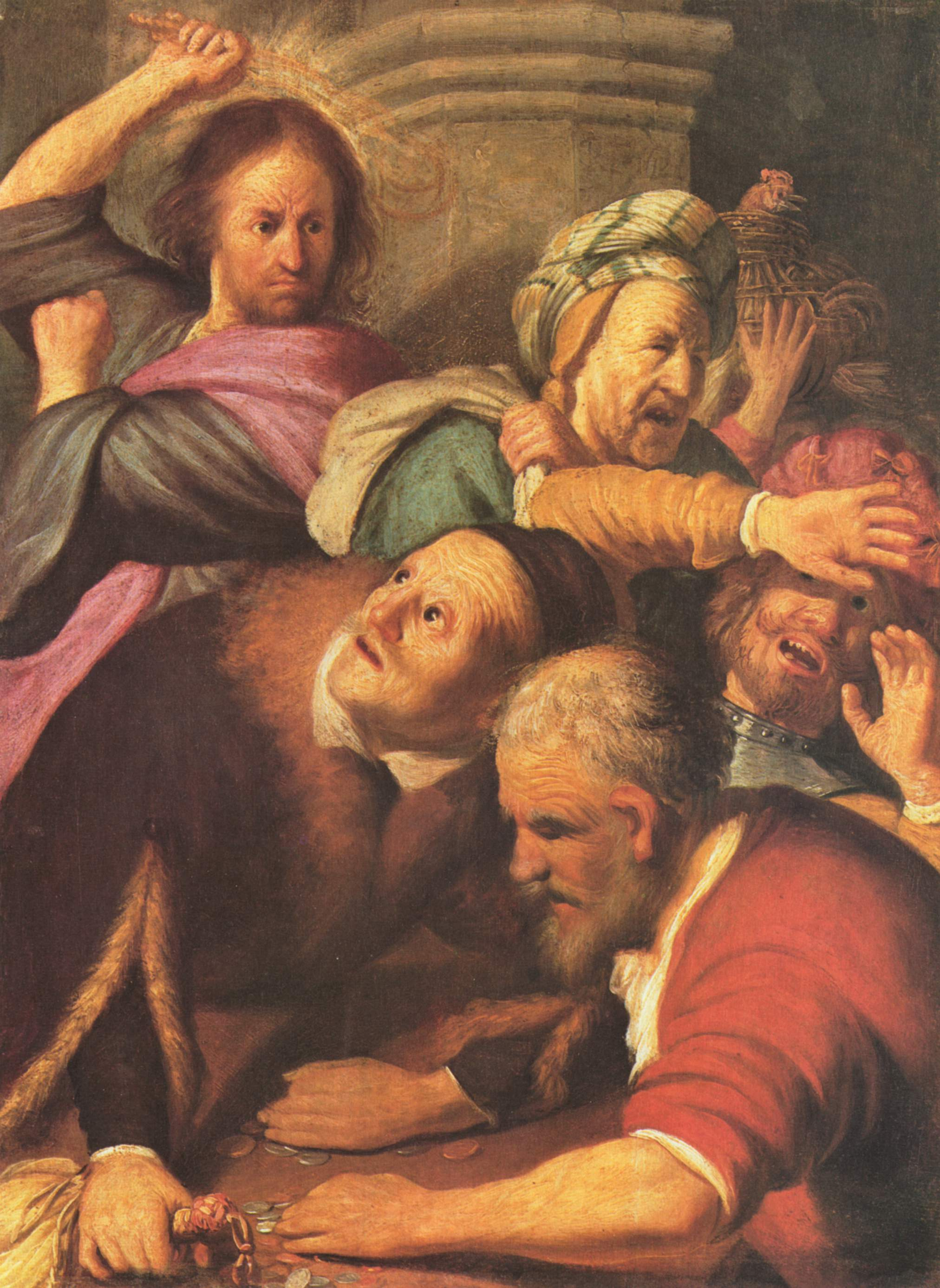
Jesus (top left) lashes out at money changers with a whip. Rembrandt (1626).

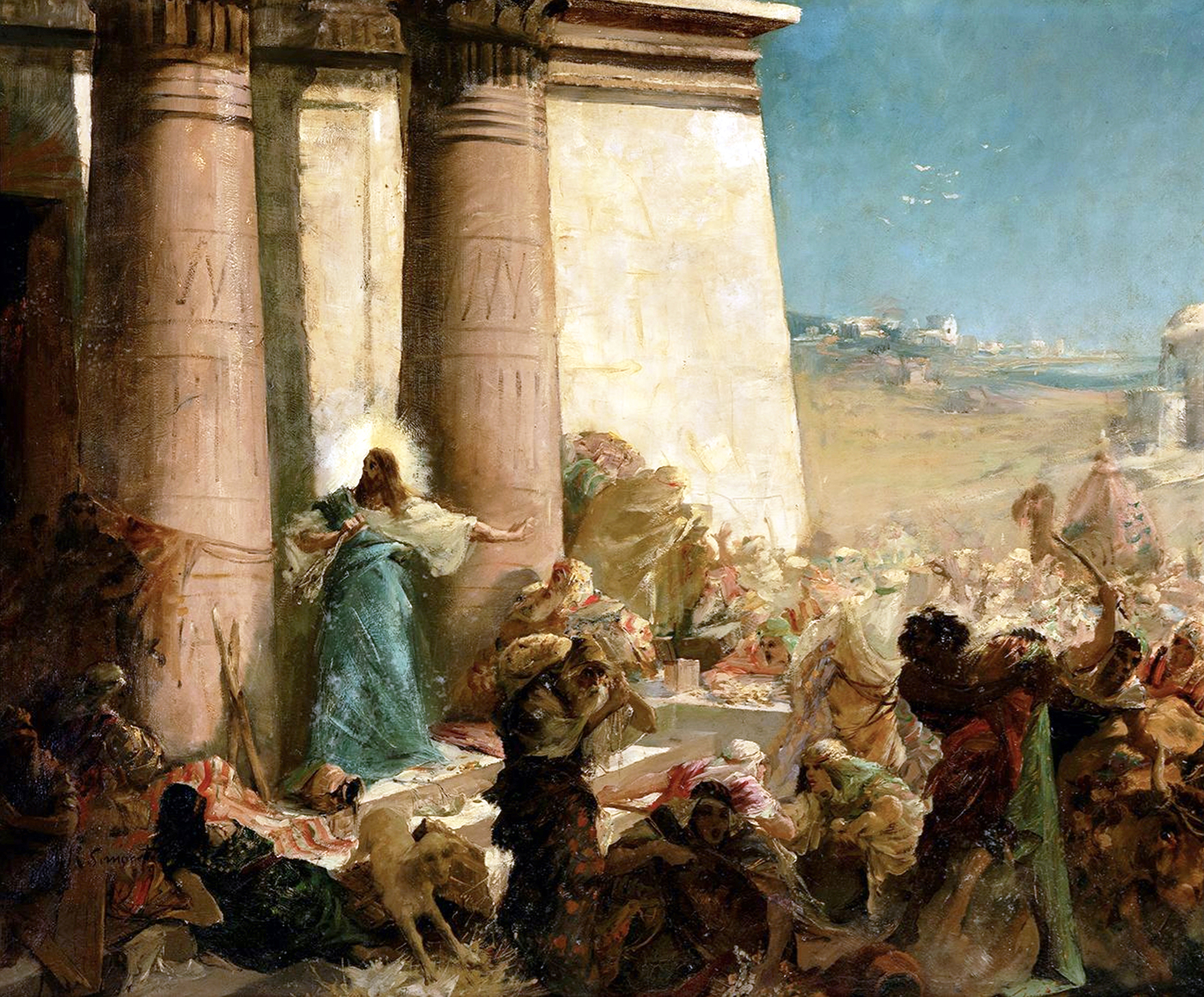
Cleansing of the Temple by Enrique Simonet

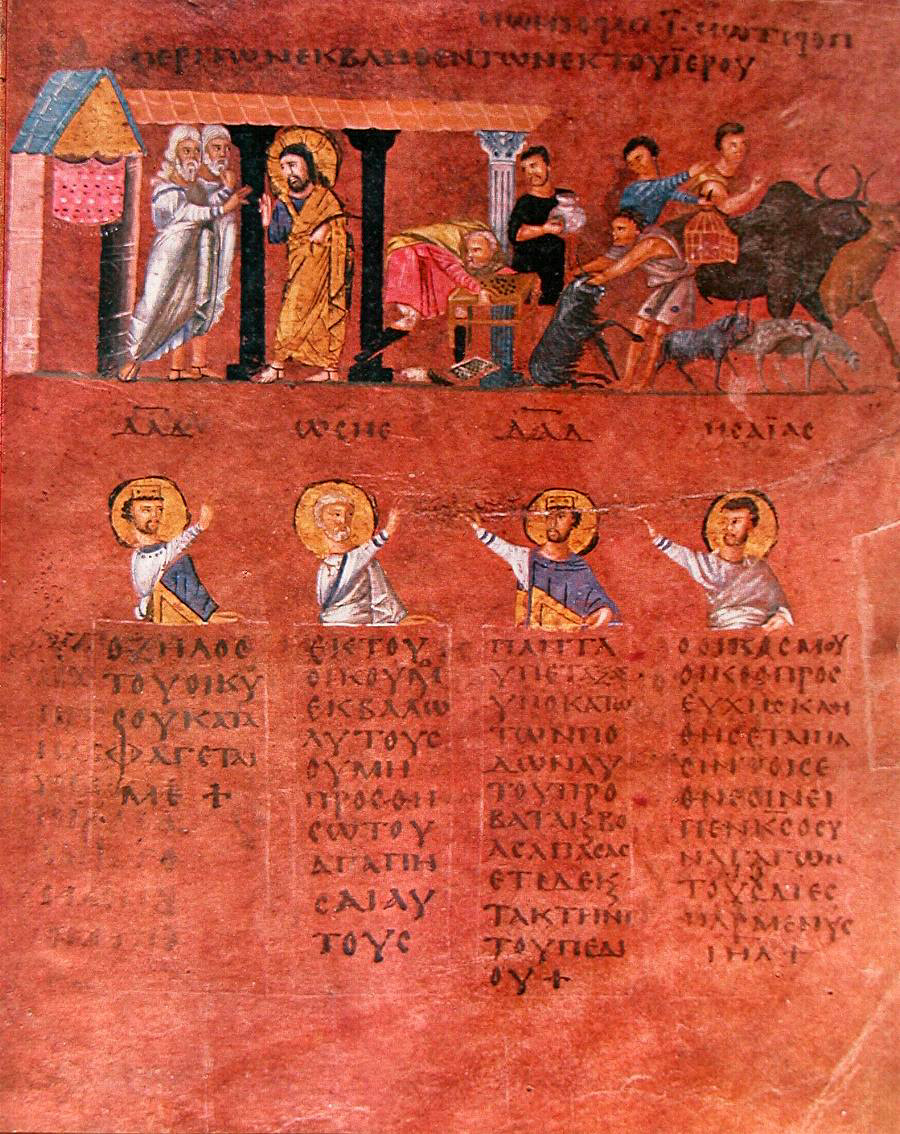
The cleansing of the temple, from the Rossano Gospels, 6th century. The verses cited below are Psalm 69:9, Hosea 9:15, Psalm 8:6–7, and Isaiah 56:7–8

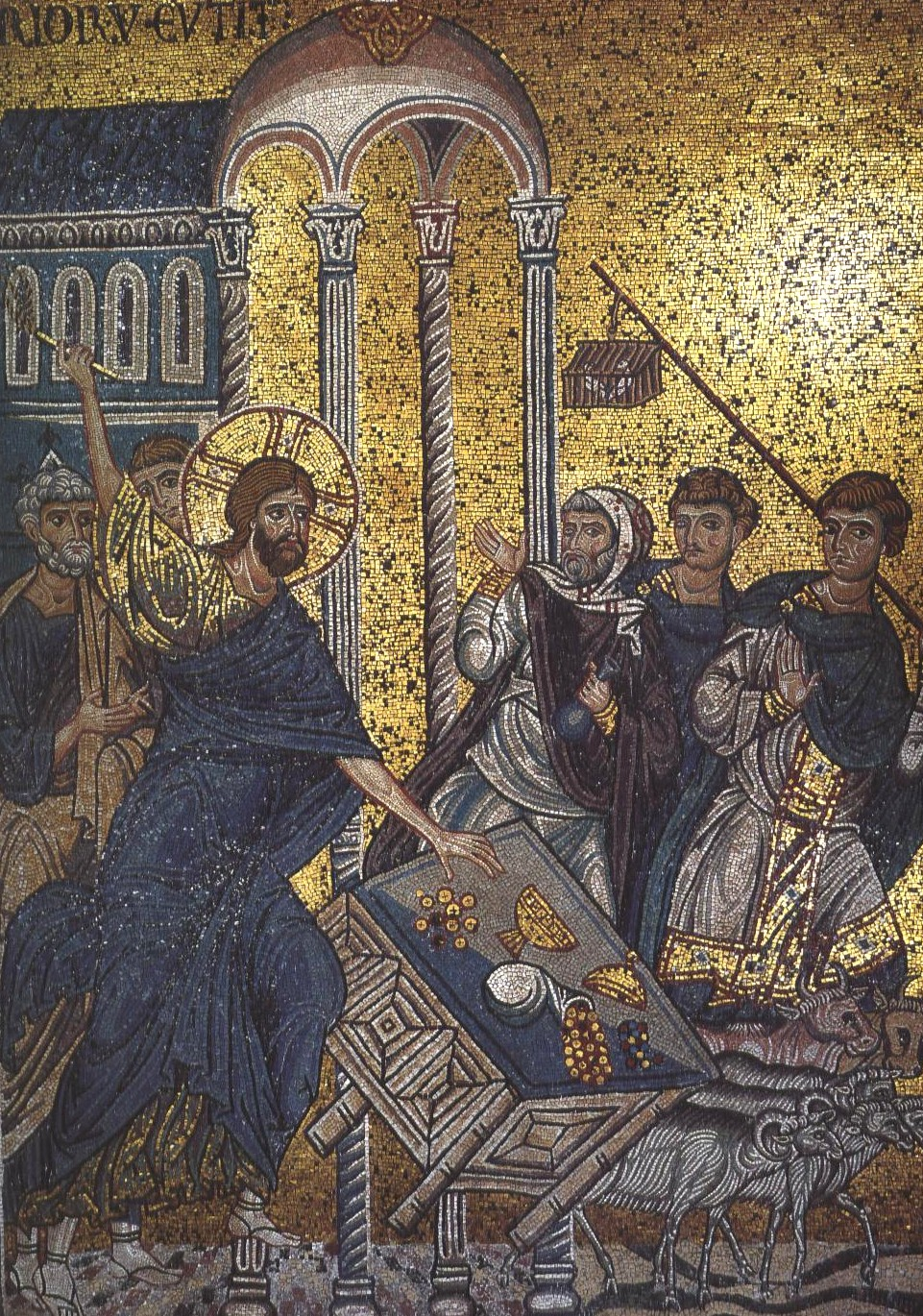
The cleansing of the temple, from the Monreale Cathedral mosaics.

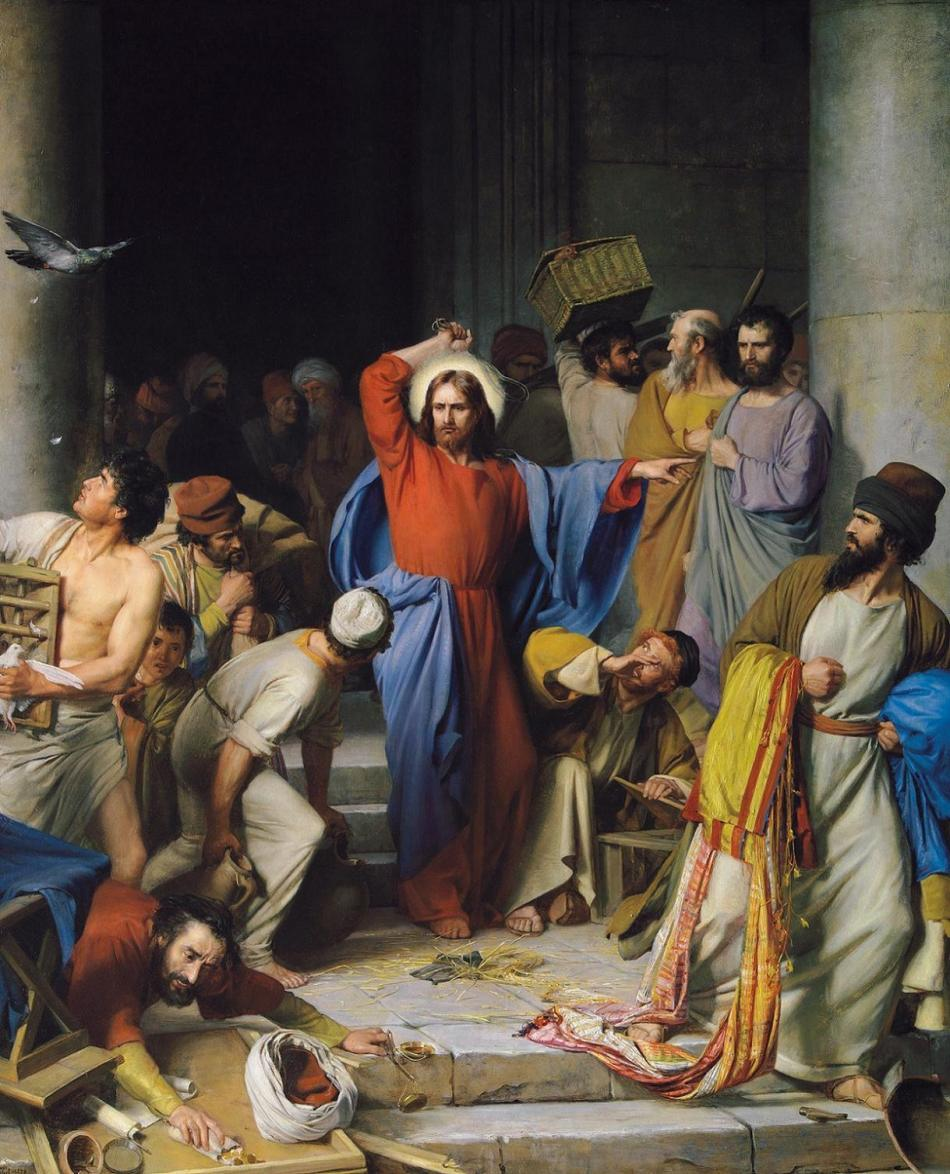
Casting out the money changers, by Carl Bloch

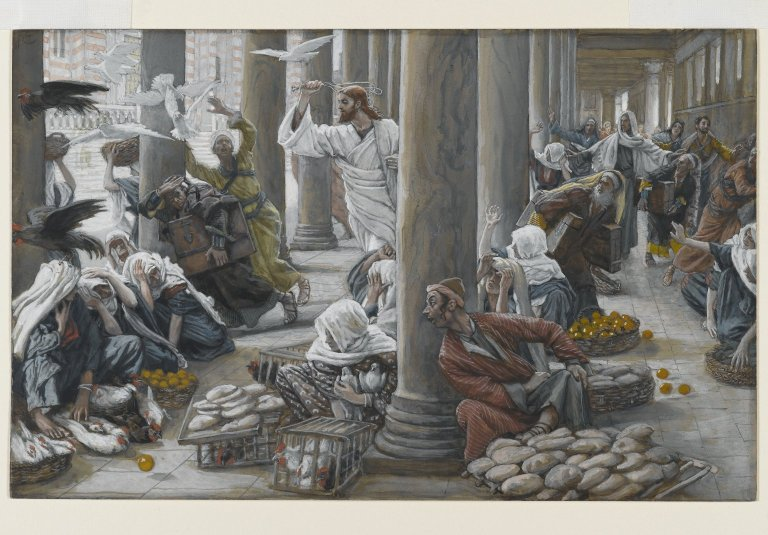
The merchants chased from the temple, by James Tissot

== See also ==
- Antisemitism and the New Testament
- Christian views on poverty and wealth – Different opinions that Christians have held about material riches
- Gessius Florus
- Gospel harmony
- Ministry of Jesus

== Notes ==
Cleansing of the Temple Life of Jesus: Ministry Events
Preceded by Wedding in Cana in John 2 and Triumphal Entry in the Synoptic Gospels	New Testament Events	Succeeded by Jesus and Nicodemus in John 3 and Fig Tree Cursed in the Synoptic Gospels
