= Christ Driving the Money Changers from the Temple (El Greco, London) =

1600 painting by El Greco

- La expulsión de los mercaderes del templo (Spanish)
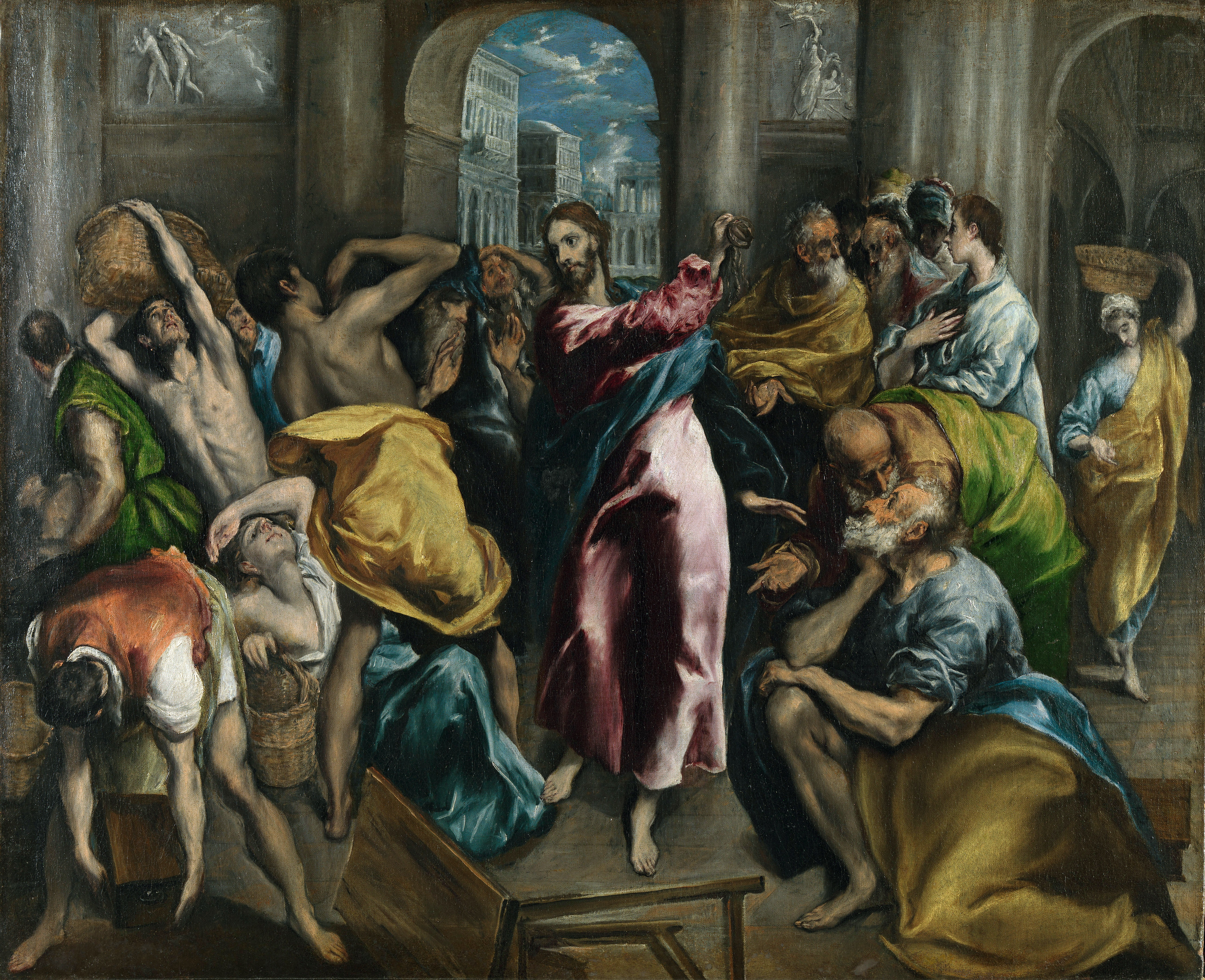
- Artist: El Greco
- Year: 1600
- Type: oil painting
- Dimensions: 106 cm × 130 cm (42 in × 51 in)
- Location: National Gallery, London

Christ Driving the Money Changers from the Temple is a 1600 painting by El Greco, now in the National Gallery in London, England. It depicts the Cleansing of the Temple, an event in the Life of Christ.

There exist four copies of the painting and also a faithful reproduction in the National Gallery in London, which has recently been considered as authentic by scholars in the field of visual arts. Two versions and that other on loan from Madrid are titled Purification of the Temple. The one at the National Gallery in Washington is called Christ Cleansing the Temple.

== See also ==
- List of works by El Greco
