= Christ Driving the Money Changers from the Temple (El Greco, Washington) =

Painting by El Greco

- Artist: El Greco
- Year: 1568
- Medium: Oil on panel
- Dimensions: 65.4 cm × 83.2 cm (25.7 in × 32.8 in)
- Location: National Gallery of Art, Washington, D.C.

Christ Driving the Money Changers from the Temple is a painting by El Greco, from 1568, now in the National Gallery of Art in Washington, D.C., in the United States. It depicts the cleansing of the Temple, an event in the life of Christ.

There exist three other copies of the painting and also a faithful reproduction in the National Gallery in London, which has recently been considered as authentic by scholars in the field of visual arts. Two versions and another on loan from Madrid are titled Purification of the Temple. The one at the National Gallery in Washington is called Christ Cleansing the Temple. The painting which bears this actual title belongs to the Minneapolis Institute of Art and it is somewhat different from all the other versions of this legendary Christian scene.

== Analysis ==
It is considered by several authors as the masterpiece of the Venetian period of El Greco. Despite containing some Cretan elements acquired during his formal training, this painting can be fully considered a work of the Italian Renaissance. Perspective emphasizes the handling of the anatomy, the application of color and drama of the scene.

This is a picture of varied influences, from Tintoretto to Michelangelo and Raphael through Paolo Veronese, and other painters of the Cinquecento venetian school. Still, some errors are seen like the absence of a point of view, the difficulty in making complex groups and the lack of experience in modeling figures.

== See also ==
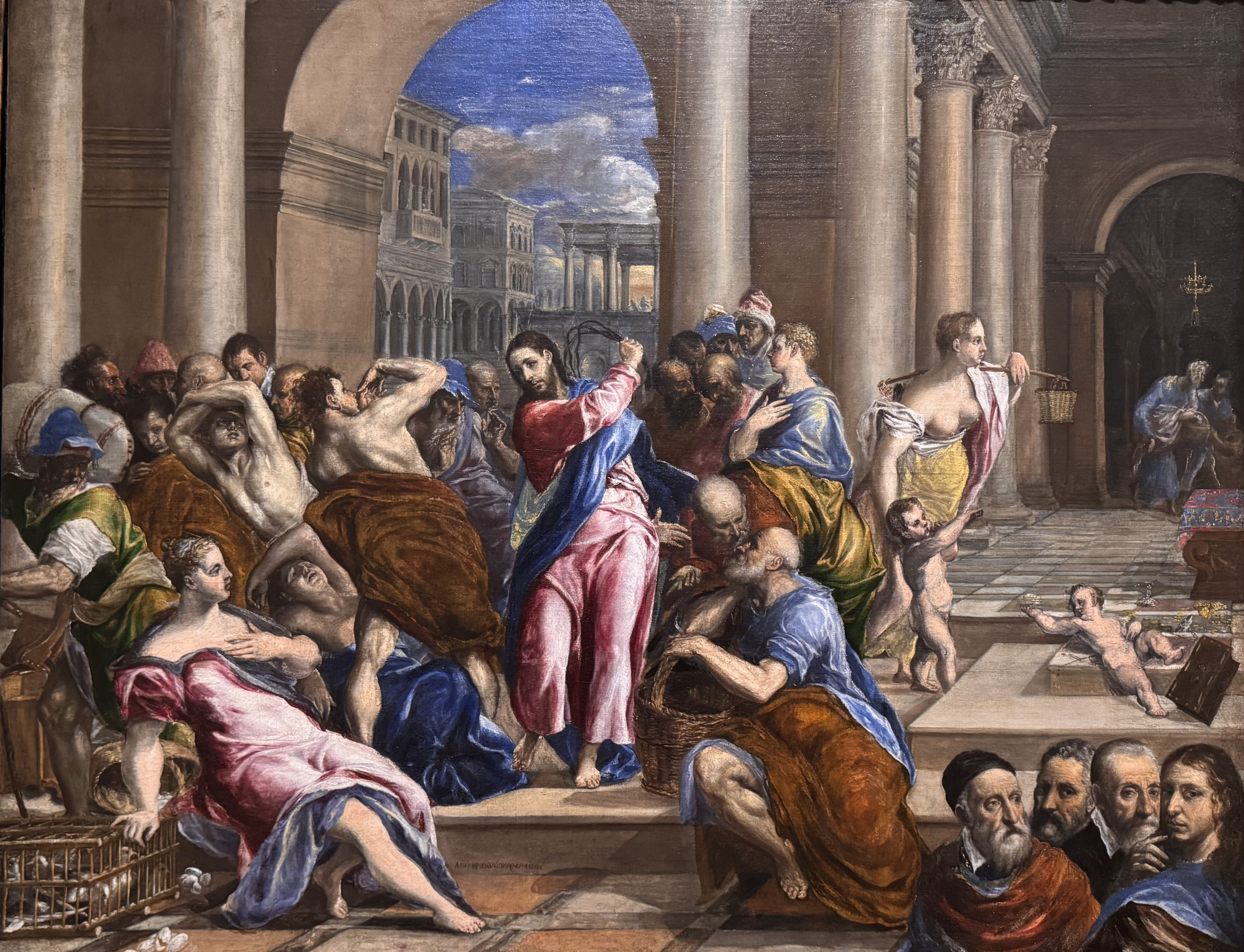
1571 version displayed in the Minneapolis Institute of Art

- List of works by El Greco

== Bibliography ==
- Álvarez Lopera, José. (2005) El Greco. Madrid: Arlanza, Biblioteca «Descubrir el Arte», (colección «Grandes maestros»). ISBN 84-95503-44-1.
- Scholz-Hansel, Michael. (2003) El Greco. Colonia: Taschen. ISBN 978-3-8228-3173-1.
