= José Nin y Tudó =

Spanish painter (1843–1908)

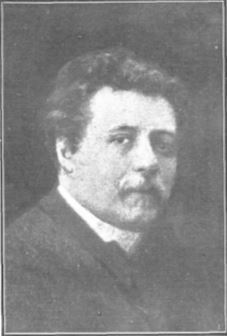
José Nin y Tudó (date unknown)

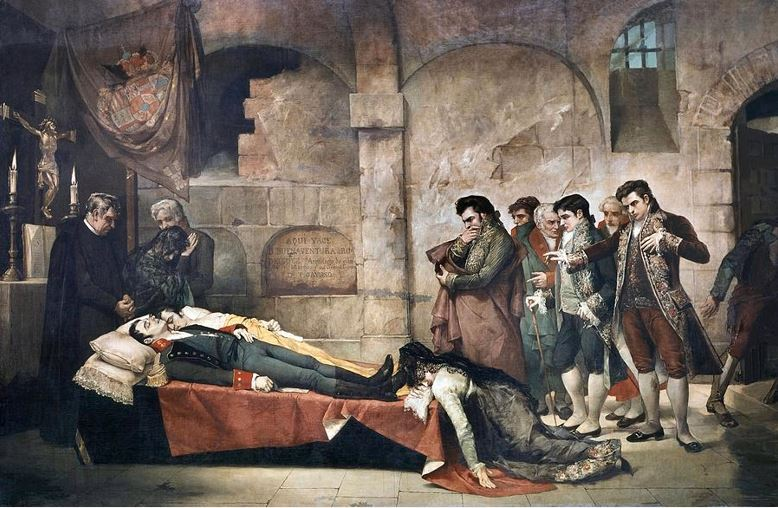
The Deaths of Daoiz and Velarde (1876). Museo de Historia de Madrid.

José Nin y Tudó (20 August 1843, El Vendrell – March 1908, Madrid) was a Spanish painter. Although he worked in a variety of genres, he is best remembered for his decorative work and his series of "mortuary paintings", depicting famous men lying in state or on their death beds.

== Biography ==
His father, Joaquín Nin y Güell (1817-1889), was a military officer; originally from Tarragona. As a young man, he planned to follow in his father's footsteps with a military career but, as he grew older, he developed a fondness for painting.

He began his studies at the Escola de la Llotja then, thanks to a scholarship from the Diputació de Barcelona, he was able to attend the Real Academia de Bellas Artes de San Fernando in Madrid, where he studied with Carlos Luis de Ribera. Much of his career would be spent in Madrid.

His murals include those at the top of the Café de Madrid (formerly the Café Iris) and at the Palacio de Anglada. He won a third-class medal at the National Exhibition of Fine Arts in 1871 for his portrait of General Juan Prim, and a second-class medal in 1876 for his portrayal of the corpses of Daoiz and Velarde, heroes of the Dos de Mayo Uprising, lying in state at the Iglesia de San Martín.

He died from paralysis. His works may be seen at the Biblioteca Museu Víctor Balaguer in Vilanova i la Geltrú, among others.
