= Juan Nicasio Gallego =

Spanish priest and poet (1777–1853)

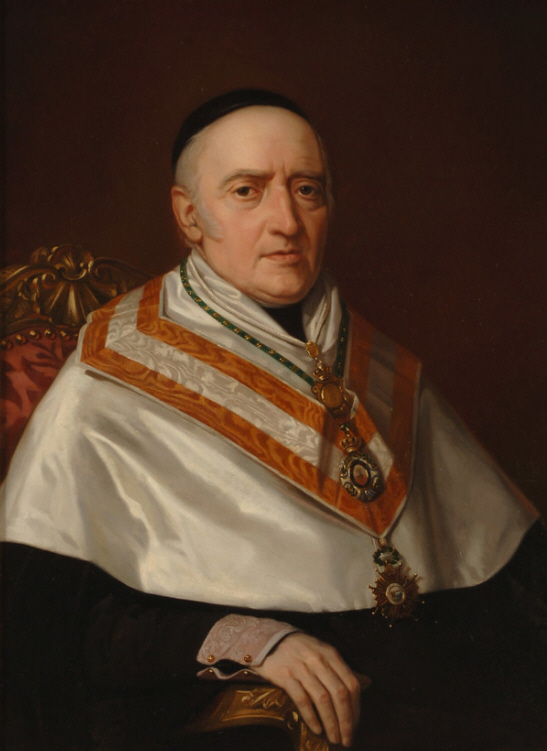
- Portrait by Luis de Madrazo
- Born: Juan Nicasio Gallego; 14 December 1777; Zamora, Spain
- Died: 9 January 1853 (aged 75); Madrid, Spain

Seat Q of the Real Academia Española
- In office 1833 – 9 January 1853
- Preceded by: Antonio Porcel Román
- Succeeded by: Antonio Ferrer del Río

Juan Nicasio Gallego was a Spanish priest and poet. He was born in Zamora, Spain, 14 December 1777, and died in Madrid, 9 January 1853.

== Biography ==
He received his training at Salamanca; entering into Holy orders, he soon went to Madrid, where he was given a post in the royal palace, being made director of the royal pages. His feelings as a patriot and his love for pseudo-classicism led him to associate himself with the coterie about the poet Manuel José Quintana, and to imitate the latter's metres. It is by virtue of only seven odes and elegies that Gallego is known. Of these the first was the ode, A la defensa de Buenos Ayres (1807), directed against the British invasions of the Río de la Plata. Another was his elegy on the death of the Duchess of Frias.

With intensified liberal tendencies, Gallego presented himself for election and was returned a deputy to the Cortes Generales. He had consistently opposed Napoleon's invasion of Spain, with both pen and voice, yet the despotic Ferdinand VII, after his return in 1814, imprisoned him because of his liberalism. During the second constitutional period, now free again, he was appointed Archdeacon of Valencia. The Royal Spanish Academy took him into its membership, and made him its perpetual secretary.

The most famous of the few compositions left by Gallego is the elegy El Dos de Mayo, which commemorates the events of the patriotic uprising of 2 May 1808, by a few hundred Spanish civilians and militarymen, including the artillery captains Daoiz and Velarde, and infantry lieutenant Ruiz. The revolt in Madrid inspired a general rising in Spain against Napoleon. Gallego's words, urging his countrymen to resist unto death, are said to have had a major effect.
