= Spanish ship San Ildefonso =

Spanish 18th century Royal Navy ship

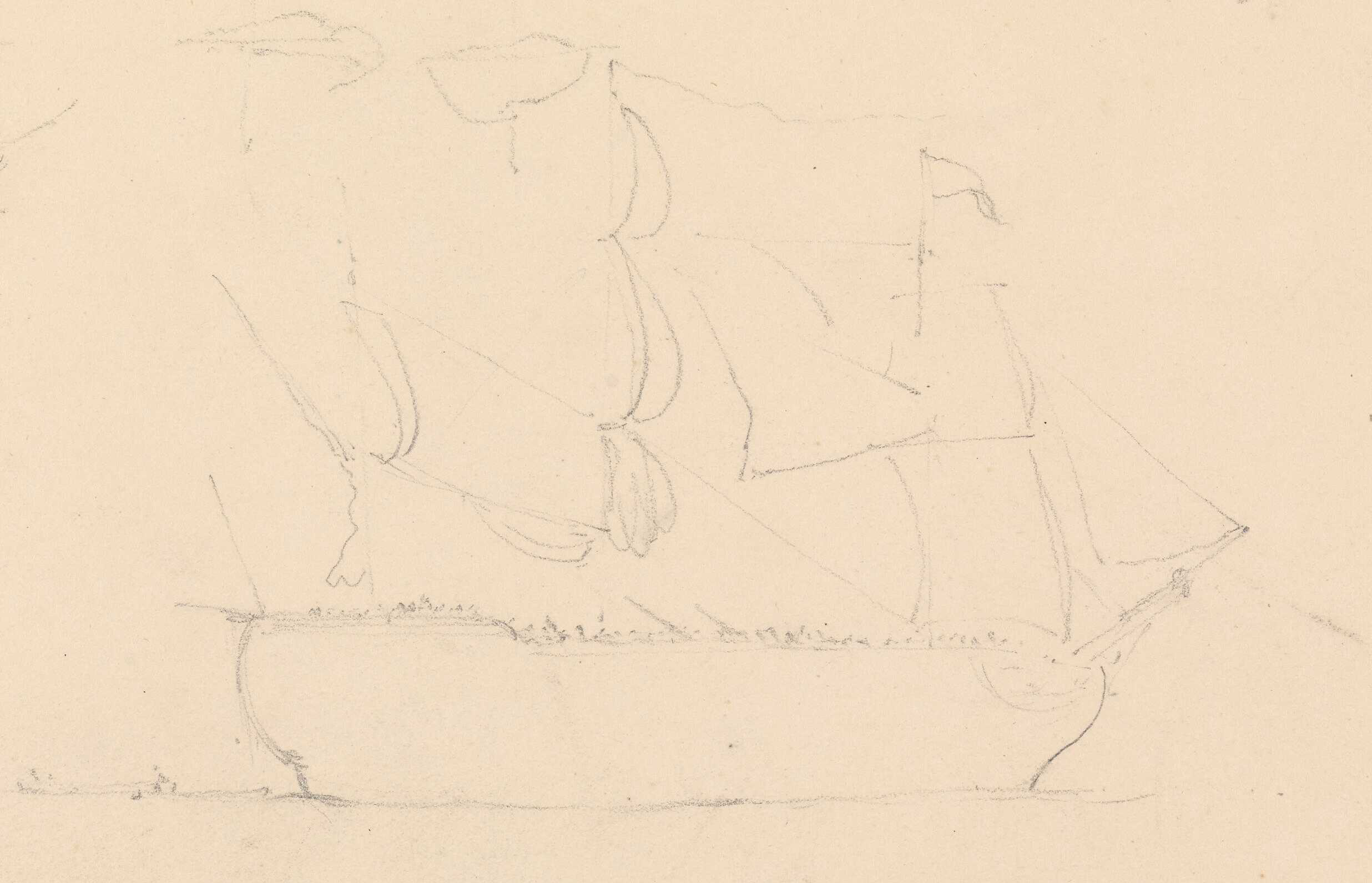
- The San Ildefonso going into Portsmouth harbour on 12 June 1814, drawn by John Christian Schetky

History

Spain
- Name: San Ildefonso
- Namesake: Town of San Ildefonso, Segovia, Spain
- Ordered: 23 February 1784
- Builder: Cartagena
- Laid down: 26 March 1784
- Launched: 22 January 1785
- Captured: 21 October 1805

United Kingdom
- Name: HMS Ildefonso
- Acquired: 21 October 1805
- Commissioned: 3 April 1806
- Decommissioned: 19 June 1806
- Recommissioned: 22 July 1808
- Reclassified: As a storeship late 1808
- Fate: Broken up in July 1816

General characteristics
- Class & type: Seventy-four (third rate)
- Armament: 74 guns (original): 28 × 24-pounder long guns on lower deck; 30 × 18-pounder long guns on upper deck; 10 × 8-pounder long guns on quarterdeck; 6 × 8-pounder long guns on forecastle

San Ildefonso was a ship of the Spanish Navy, built at Cartagena, Spain to a design by José Romero Fernández de Landa and launched in 1785. She was designed to be lighter than traditional Spanish vessels which had had difficulty matching the speed of ships of the Royal Navy. Though completed as a 74-gun ship, and always rated as such, San Ildefonso actually carried 80 cannons and obuses (howitzers) by the time of Trafalgar. She saw service against French and British vessels in the late 18th century, sailed twice to the Americas and was trapped in Cádiz by the British blockade. San Ildefonso was captured by the British third-rate HMS Defence at the Battle of Trafalgar and successfully weathered the storm afterwards to be taken into Royal Navy service as HMS Ildefonso.

== Design ==
San Ildefonso has been described as a technical milestone in 18th-century Spanish shipbuilding. Having fought the Royal Navy in various wars the Spanish admirals were concerned that their ships could not match equivalent British vessels for speed. San Ildefonso incorporated many amendments from traditional Spanish designs in order to improve her speed. Instead of traditional iron bolts holding the hull together the vessel utilised much lighter wooden treenails, the upper parts of the ship were made from pine and cedar instead of oak to reduce weight and lower the centre of gravity and the vessel was constructed shorter in length than a traditional Spanish seventy-four would be.

== Armament ==
Although completed with 74 guns, she was later re-armed in accordance with the October 1803 Ordnance Regulations, and by the time of her participation at the Battle of Trafalgar, San Ildefonso actually carried a total of 80 guns, comprising 28 × 24-pounder long guns on her lower deck, 30 × 24-pounder long guns on her upper deck (having replaced the original 18-pounders on that level), 4 × 8-pounder long guns and 8 × 30-pounder obuses (howitzers) on her quarterdeck, 2 × 8-pounder long guns and 2 × 30-pounder obuses on her forecastle, and 6 × 24-pounder obuses on her poop. However, unlike most other Spanish ships of the line (including all those present at Trafalgar), San Ildefonso did not carry any four-pounder anti-personnel obuses on her poop.

== Spanish service ==
San Ildefonso was designed by José Romero Fernández de Landa and built by him at the naval dockyard in Cartagena. She was ordered on 23 February 1784 with her keel being laid down a little over a month later. She took ten months to build, being launched on 22 January 1785. She began a forty-day sea trial period on 19 August 1785 but shortly afterwards was disarmed at Cartagena and placed in reserve for two years and nine months. San Ildefonso was refitted in 1788 and underwent more trials before being placed into reserve once more in October of that year. She was reactivated again in April 1789 and made a cruise to Cádiz in August, becoming damaged on the way. San Ildefonso underwent a third period of reserve later that year before being reactivated and having her interior layout rearranged.

The Morning After Trafalgar by Clarkson Stanfield, 1863. It depicts the dismasted San Ildefonso following the Battle of Trafalgar

San Ildefonso then sailed on campaign against the French and British navies for four years beginning in 1793. She returned to port at Cádiz on 3 March 1797 and was subsequently blockaded in that port by the Royal Navy. San Ildefonso sailed to America twice from 1798 to 1802 as an escort to convoys of galleons. During these voyages artillery officer Luis Daoiz de Torres, who would later lead the Spanish forces against French troops in the Dos de Mayo Uprising, served aboard the ship due to a shortage of trained naval officers. San Ildefonso was placed in reserve at Ferrol in 1802 for the last time in her career. After another period of refit in July and August 1805 she joined the main Spanish fleet prior to the Battle of Trafalgar. In her career to this point San Ildefonso had been in Spanish service for 21 years but had spent 9 of those years disarmed in reserve and had not fought any engagements.

== Capture and British service ==
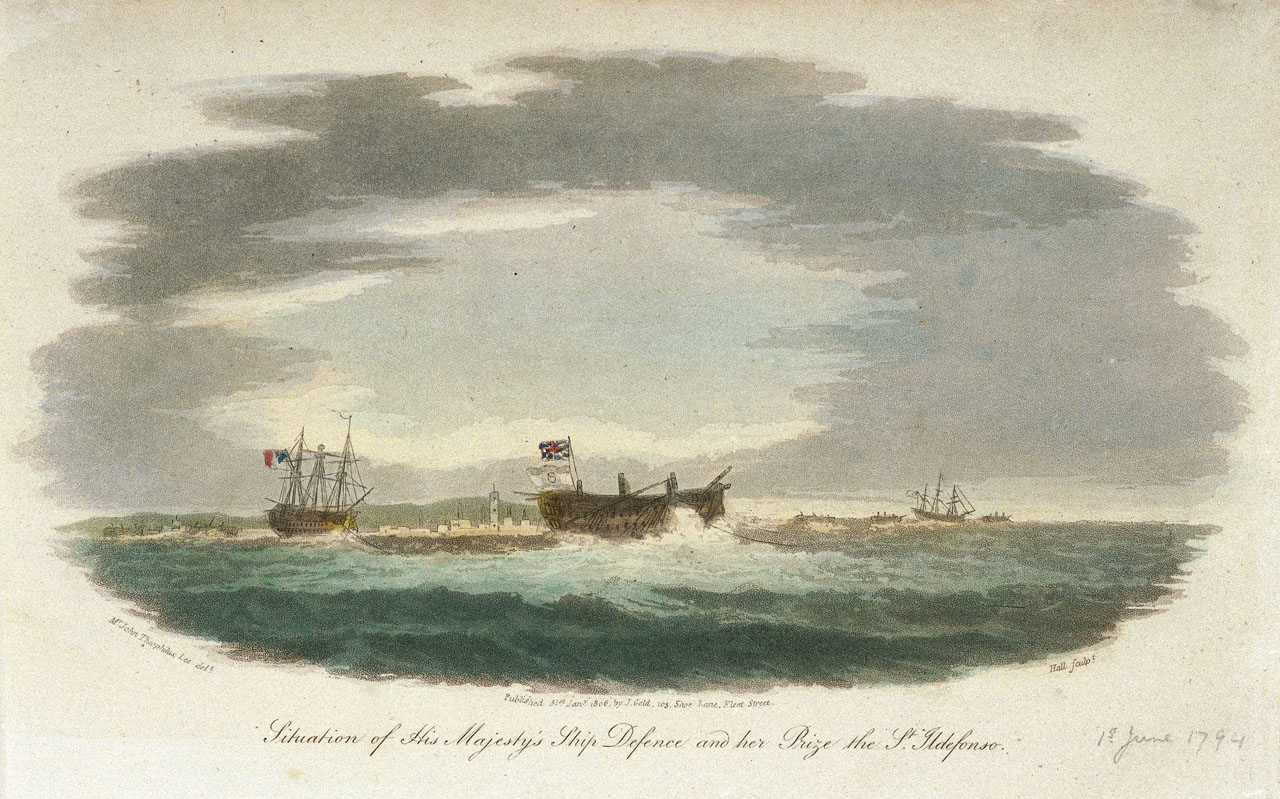
HMS Defence (left) and her prize, the San Ildefonso, riding at anchor the day after Trafalgar, near Cádiz, with other ships wrecked on the coast around Rota in the distance

San Ildefonso and her commander, Brigadier (Commodore) José de Vargas, were captured by the British third-rate HMS Defence. Defence was at the rear of the British line and so joined the battle later than most other ships but had already dismasted the French 74-gun ship Berwick before engaging San Ildefonso. The Spanish vessel had already been damaged in the action and after a fierce fight lasting less than an hour surrendered to the British Defence, having suffered casualties amounting to 34 dead and 126 wounded. San Ildefonso was successfully towed by the Defence to Gibraltar, surviving the storm that followed the battle. She was taken into British service as HMS Ildefonso. Ildefonso was laid up at Portsmouth until 3 April 1806 when she was placed under the command of newly promoted Captain John Quilliam, a veteran of Trafalgar. The ship was paid off in Portsmouth on 19 June but recommissioned on 22 July 1808 under Captain Edward Harvey. She was decommissioned later that year and reduced to a victualling storeship in Portsmouth and, later, Spithead. Being obsolete and of no further use after the conclusion of the Napoleonic Wars she was broken up in July 1816.

=== San Ildefonso's ensign ===
The 145 m^{2} (1,560 sq ft) naval ensign that San Ildefonso flew at the Battle of Trafalgar was hung in St Paul's Cathedral at Admiral Nelson's funeral on 9 January 1806. The flag, damaged during the battle, was presented to the National Maritime Museum, Greenwich by the cathedral in 1907.

The ensign draped in St Paul's for Nelsons funeral

In 1962 the ensign was draped over the parapet of the Queen's House for photography

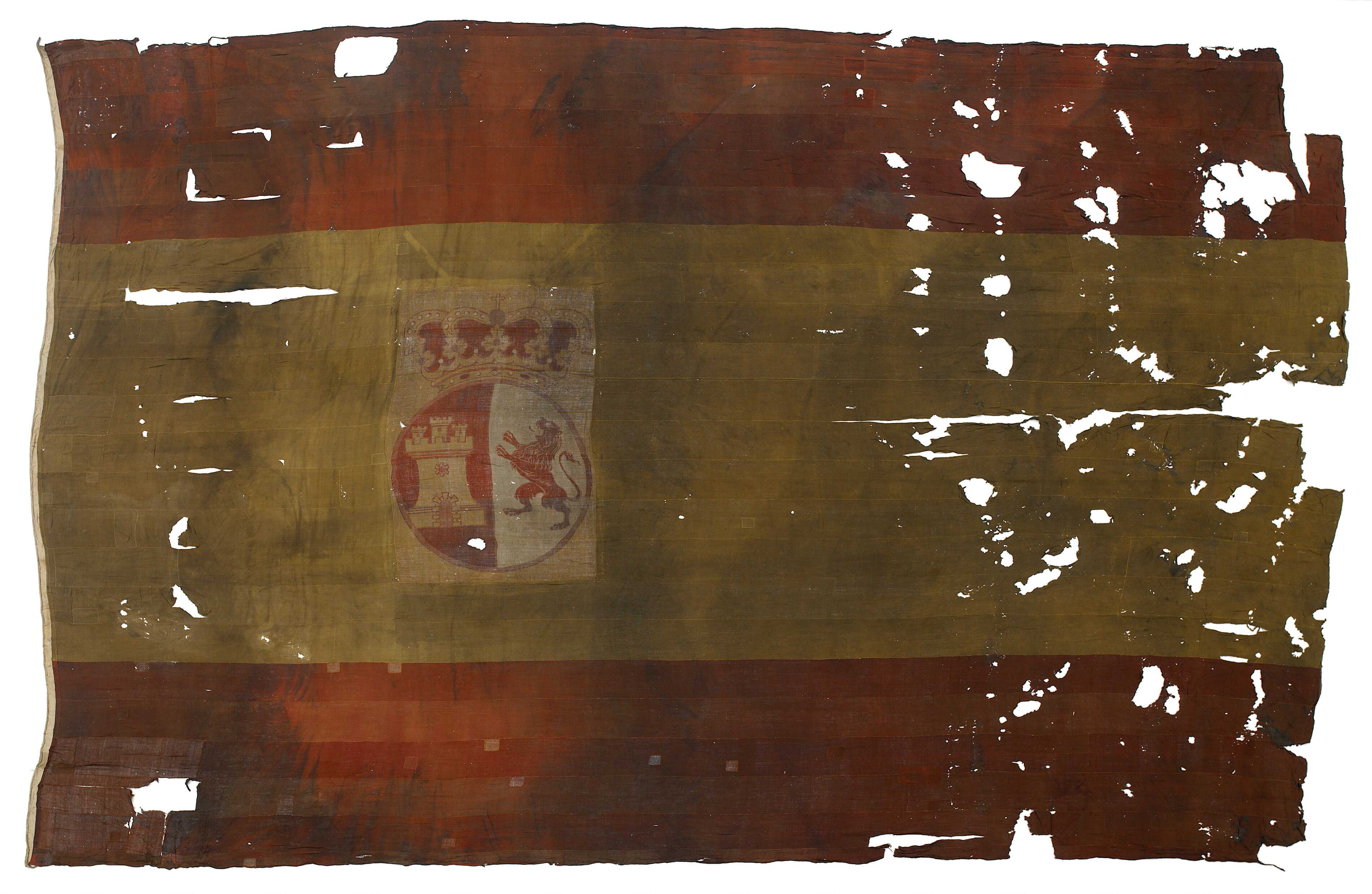
Presently at the National Maritime Museum, Greenwich

== Bibliography ==
- Adkin, Mark (2005). The Trafalgar Companion: A Guide to History's Most Famous Sea Battle and the Life of Admiral Lord Nelson. Aurum. ISBN 1-84513-018-9.
- Adkins, Roy (2004). Trafalgar: The Biography of a Battle. Little, Brown. ISBN 0-316-72511-0.
- Clayton, Tim & Craig, Phil (2004). Trafalgar: The Men, the Battle, the Storm. Hodder & Stoughton. ISBN 0-340-83026-3.
- Fremont-Barnes, Gregory (2005). Trafalgar 1805: Nelson's Crowning Victory. Campaign. Vol. 157. Osprey Publishing. ISBN 1-84176-892-8.
- Goodwin, Peter (2005). The Ships of Trafalgar: The British, French and Spanish Fleets October 1805. Naval Institute Press. ISBN 1-59114-824-3.
- Winfield, Rif; Tredrea, John M; García-Torralba Pérez, Enrique & Blasco Felip, Manuel (2023). Spanish Warships in the Age of Sail 1700—1860: Design, Construction, Careers and Fates. Barnsley, UK: Seaforth Publishing. ISBN 978-1-5267-9078-1.
