= Manuela Malasaña =

Spanish seamstress killed by French soldiers in 1808

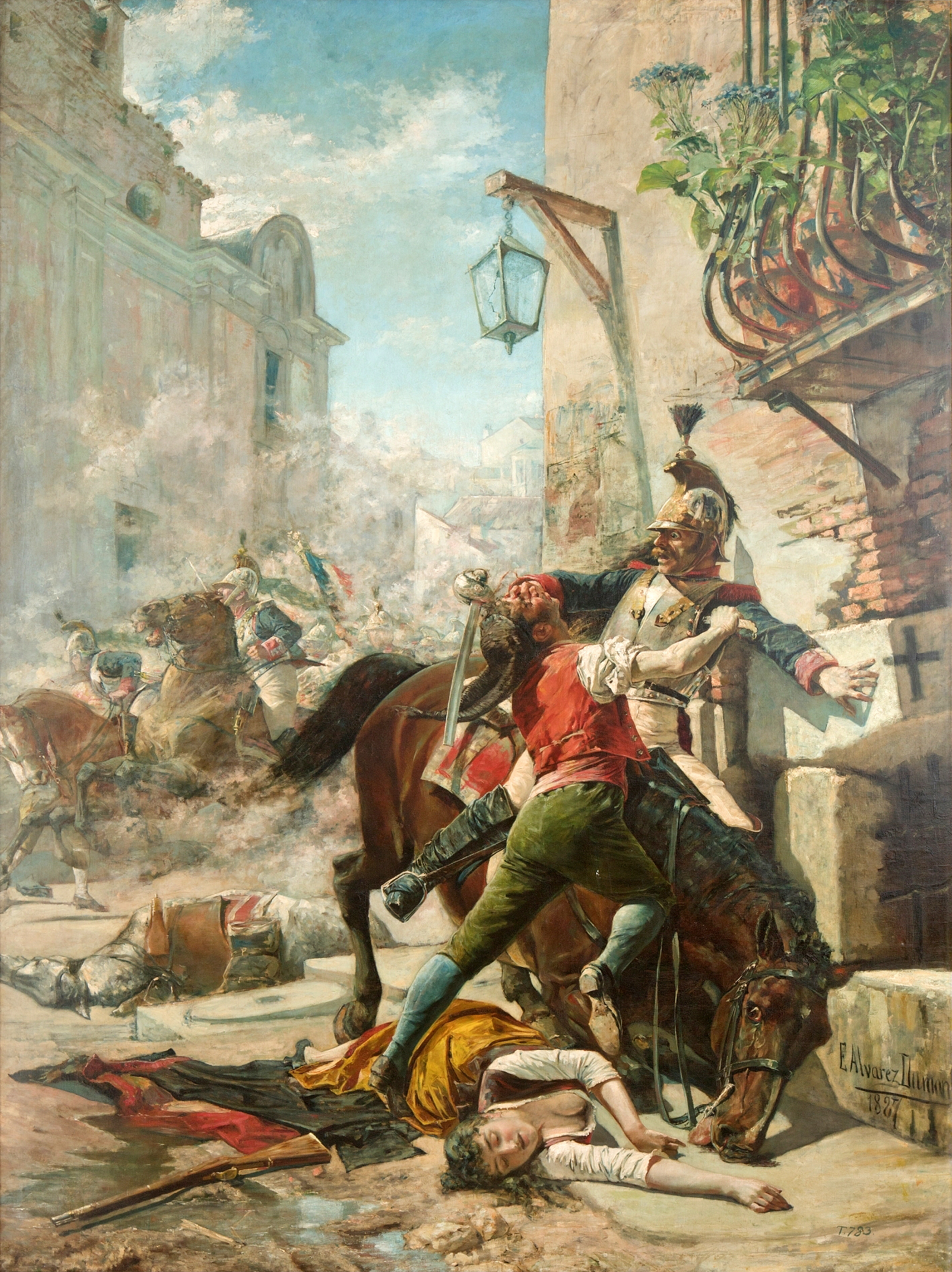
Malasaña

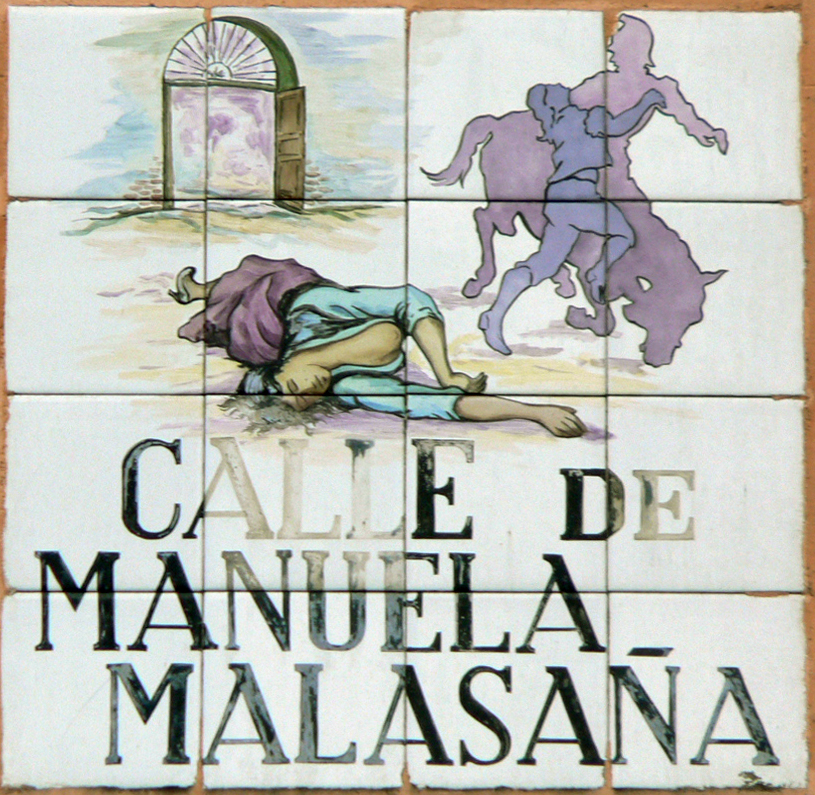
A street in the Centro district is named for Malasaña

Manuela Malasaña Oñoro ([maˈnwe.la ma.laˈsa.ɲa]; March 10, 1791 – May 2, 1808) was a Spanish seamstress killed by soldiers of Napoleon I of France during the Second of May Uprising in Madrid. The uprising was part of the Spanish War of Independence.

She was the daughter of a French baker named Jean Malesange, hispanicized "Malasaña", and his wife Marcela Oñoro. She was a seamstress and lived on the fourth floor of 18 San Andres Street, in the neighbourhood which was then known as Maravillas (now commonly known as Malasaña).

On May 2, 1808, Manuela was only 17 years old. The legendary version of her death says she fought the French, working in the defense of the Artillery Battery at Monteleón, led by Luis Daoíz y Torres and Pedro Velarde y Santillán. Her father was purported to fire against the French from the balcony of her house and she supplied him with gunpowder and munitions until she died when she was struck by a bullet. However, the scholar Carlos Cambronero discovered the death certificate of Jean Malasgne, proving that he had died before the uprising took place.

It is possible, though not certain, that Manuela Malasaña had fought in the park of artillery Monteleón, as it is known that other women from the neighborhood did, but the generally accepted version is that she would have remained sheltered from the fighting in the embroidery workshop where she worked, by order of the owner of the workshop. When the shooting stopped, she returned home.

She had been in possession of a pair of scissors and the French soldiers, under the authority of the Martial law which was in place at the time, accused her of carrying a "weapon" and immediately carried out a summary execution by shooting her. According to another version Manuela Malasaña came across French soldiers who tried to grope and molest her. She threatened them with a pair of scissors, for fear of sexual abuse or worse. The French soldiers shot her. Manuela died 18 hours after the uprising in the current Plaza del Dos de Mayo.

Her body was registered under number 74 in the list of the 409 victims of that day, the documentation is kept in the military and Municipal Archives of Madrid. She was buried in the Hospital de la Buena Dicha, (today Church of Buena Dicha in Silva Street) which was founded in 1594 and was a home for the poor. Many of the wounded of the 2 May revolt were treated at this hospital, and many of the casualties were buried there.

Her portrait is in the Hall of Heroines of the Army Museum and is the work of José Luis Villar and Rodriguez de Castro.

Manuela had become known in her neighborhood for her youth and charm, and dying so young and giving her life to the cause of freedom made her a great legend and heroine amongst the people of Madrid. The city of Madrid dedicated to her memory a street bearing her name in her old neighborhood of Maravillas, which crosses San Andres Street near where she lived. By extension, from the '80s, all of the Maravillas district became known as the Malasaña neighbourhood in Madrid. The nearby town of Móstoles also honoured her with a street and a metro station on line 12 (MetroSur).
