= Plaza del Dos de Mayo =

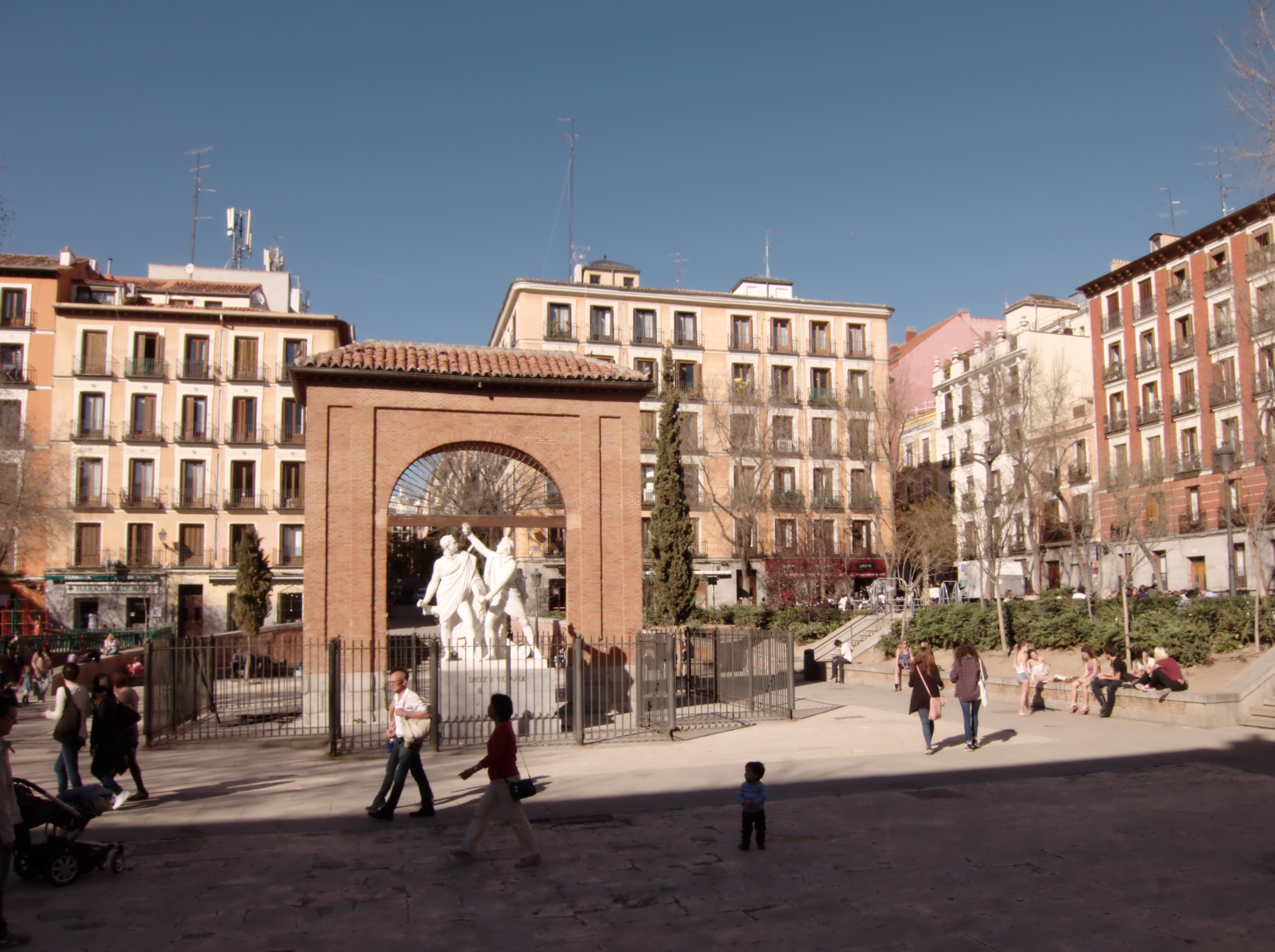
- View of the square in 2015
- Namesake: Dos de Mayo Uprising
- Type: square
- Maintained by: Ayuntamiento of Madrid
- Location: Centro, Madrid, Spain
- Postal code: 28004
- Coordinates: 40.426975°N 3.704064°W

The Plaza del Dos de Mayo is an urban square in Madrid, Spain. It is the centre of the Malasaña area, within the administrative neighborhood of Universidad.

Its name remembers the Dos de Mayo Uprising in 1808 that marked the beginning of the Spanish War of Independence. The plaza features a monumental arch in its centre dedicated to Luis Daoíz and Pedro Velarde, two soldiers fallen to the French army on 2 May 1808 who became heroes in the national imaginary. The area was the place where the Monteleón Artillery barracks lied in 1808 and where the heroic defense of the aforementioned "martyrs" took place.

In 1868 there was already an open semicircular space, but it left much to be desired. The municipal authorities, aware of the potential symbolic value, decided to refurbish and put the area in value. Following the demolishing of the Convent of Las Maravillas, the remains of the palace of the Dukes of Monteleón and further housing in order to create a gardened space with the monumental arch in its centre, the area was inaugurated on 1 May 1869.

More recently, the plaza became a preferential location for casual alcohol consumption.
