= Malasaña =

Ward in Madrid

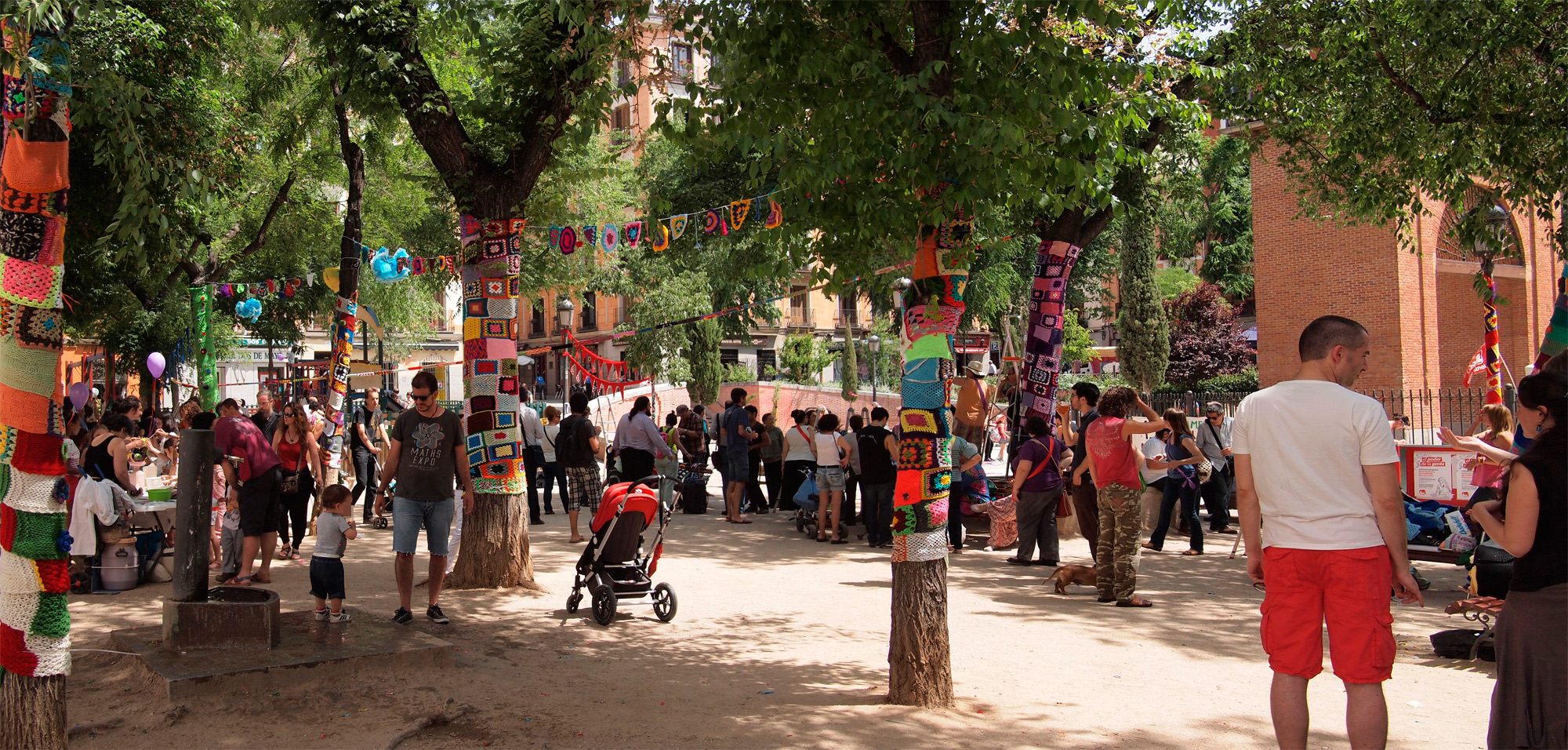
Yarn bombing at the plaza del Dos de Mayo

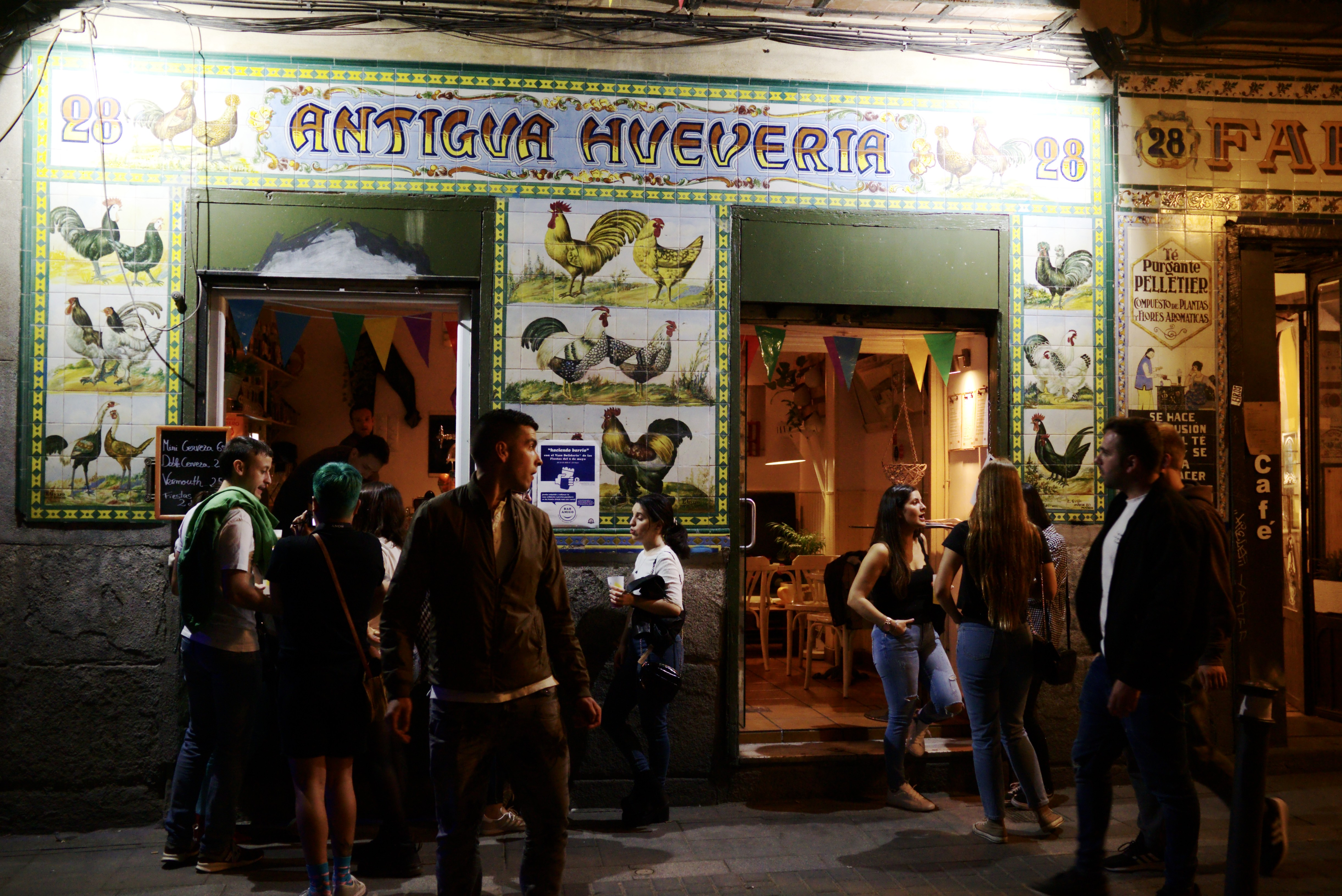
Nights in Malasaña are often crowded

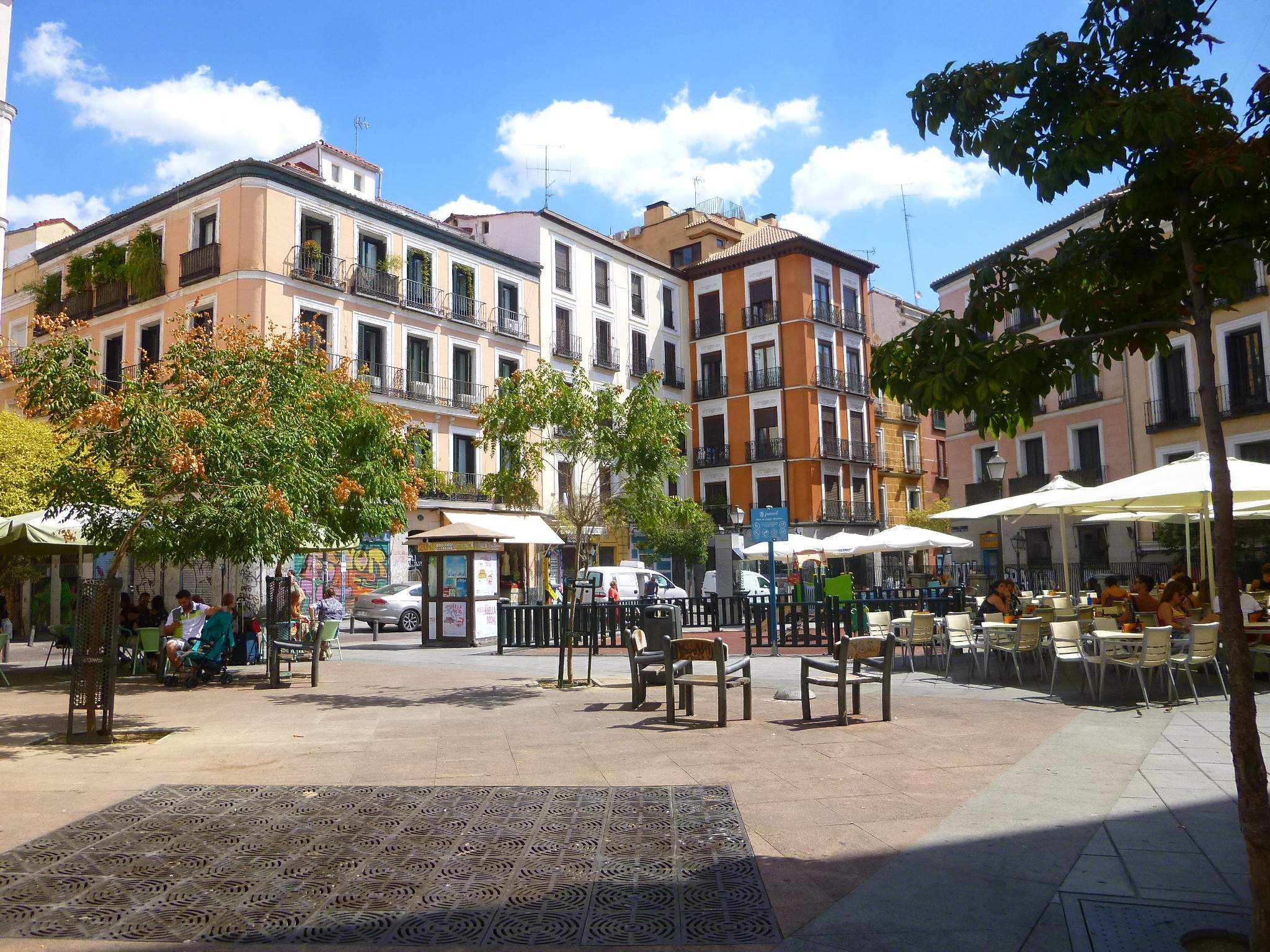
Joan Pujol square

Malasaña is a neighborhood district located in the center of Madrid, Spain. The district is square, bordered by Gran Vía to the south, Calle de Fuencarral to the east, Calle de Carranza to the north, and Calle de San Bernardo to the west.

== Overview ==
Malasaña is situated west of Chueca and east of Argüelles, making it a central neighborhood in Madrid. It is connected to the rest of the city by several metro stations. Notable residents include Esperanza Aguirre, the former president of the Community of Madrid, as well as various politicians and artists.

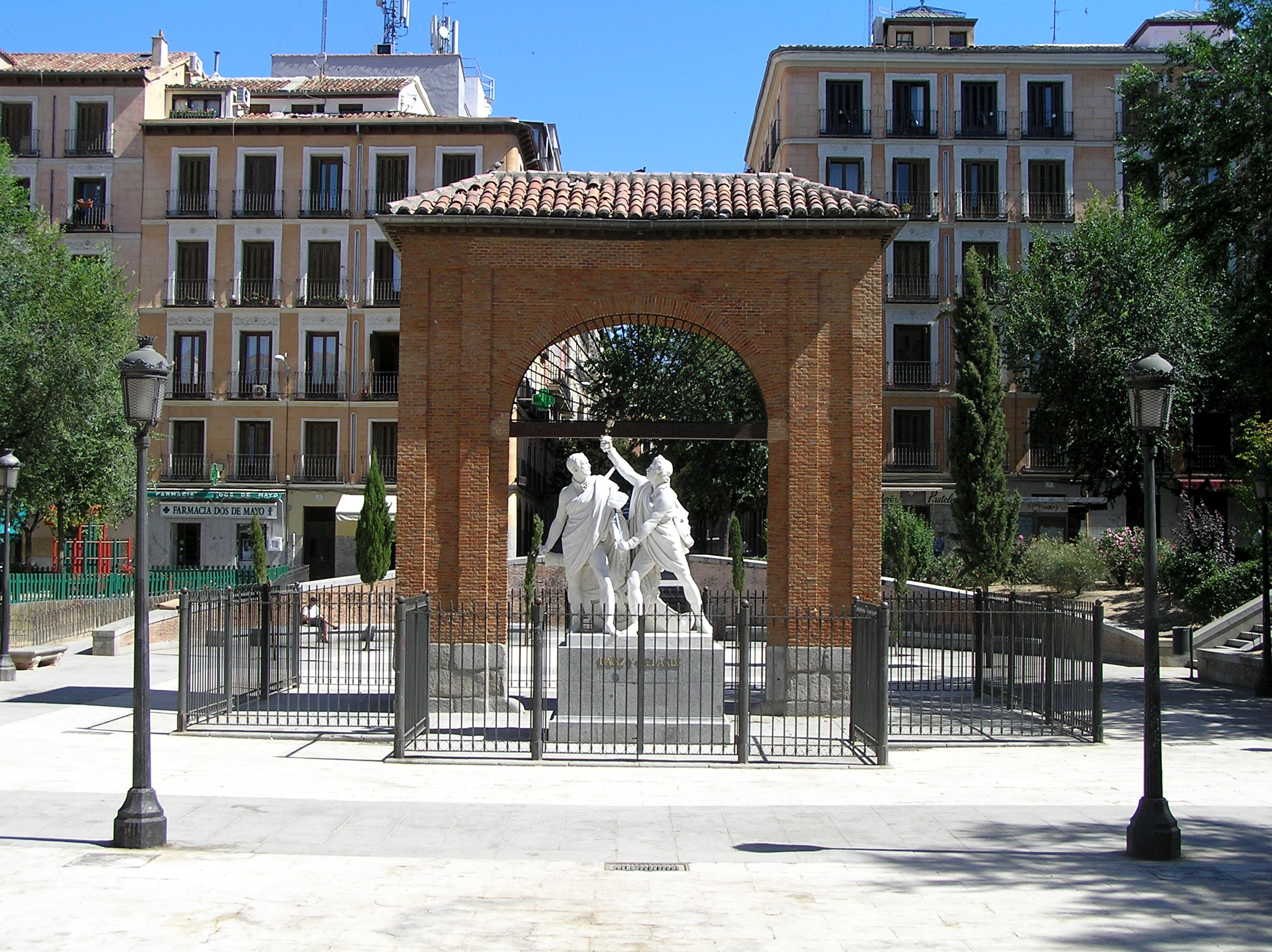
Heroes from 2nd May monument

The neighborhood is named after Manuela Malasaña, a 15-year-old girl who lived on the Calle de San Andrés, who was executed by French troops following the Dos de Mayo Uprising in 1808. A roundabout near the Glorieta de Bilbao also bears her name. The heart of the district is the Plaza del Dos de Mayo, a square that commemorates the uprising against the occupying forces and its violent suppression, an event that marked the start of the Spanish War of Independence.

== Culture ==
Malasaña is mentioned in Me Gustas Tú by Manu Chao, and the surf instrumental Farawel Malasaña by Bambi Molesters from Croatia.

With Chueca, Malasaña hosted the Art Festival Los artistas del barrio in October 2017, opening the doors of more than 70 venues to showcase the work of international and national artists like David Trullo, Pablo Sola, Daniel Garbade, Le frère, Pablo Kalafaker, Carmen Alvar, Rosa Guerrero, and more.

Malasaña has been used as a set by directors for multiple film productions, such as Marco Ferreri in El Cochecito (1960), Franklin J. Schaffner in Patton (1970), Fernando Colomo in Bajarse al moro (1989), Pedro Almodóvar in Pepi, Luci, Bom (1980) and in Law of Desire (1987), or Emilio Martínez Lázaro in The Worst Years of Our Lives (1994). It was the center of the movida movement in late 1970s and 1980s Madrid.

== Architecture ==
The architecture in Malasaña is traditionally uniform, featuring buildings with 4 to 6 floors, usually 3 to 5 windows wide. Each building is painted in a consistent color, with almost all windows adorned with French balconies and minimal ornamentation. Pedro de Ribera's Hospice, now the Municipal Museum on the Calle de Fuencarral, exemplifies the evolution of the Castilian baroque style towards a more decorative aesthetic, whereas the Cuartel del Conde-Duque, a former barracks that is today a cultural center, is an example of Madrid's Bourbon architecture.

== Plaza del Dos de Mayo ==
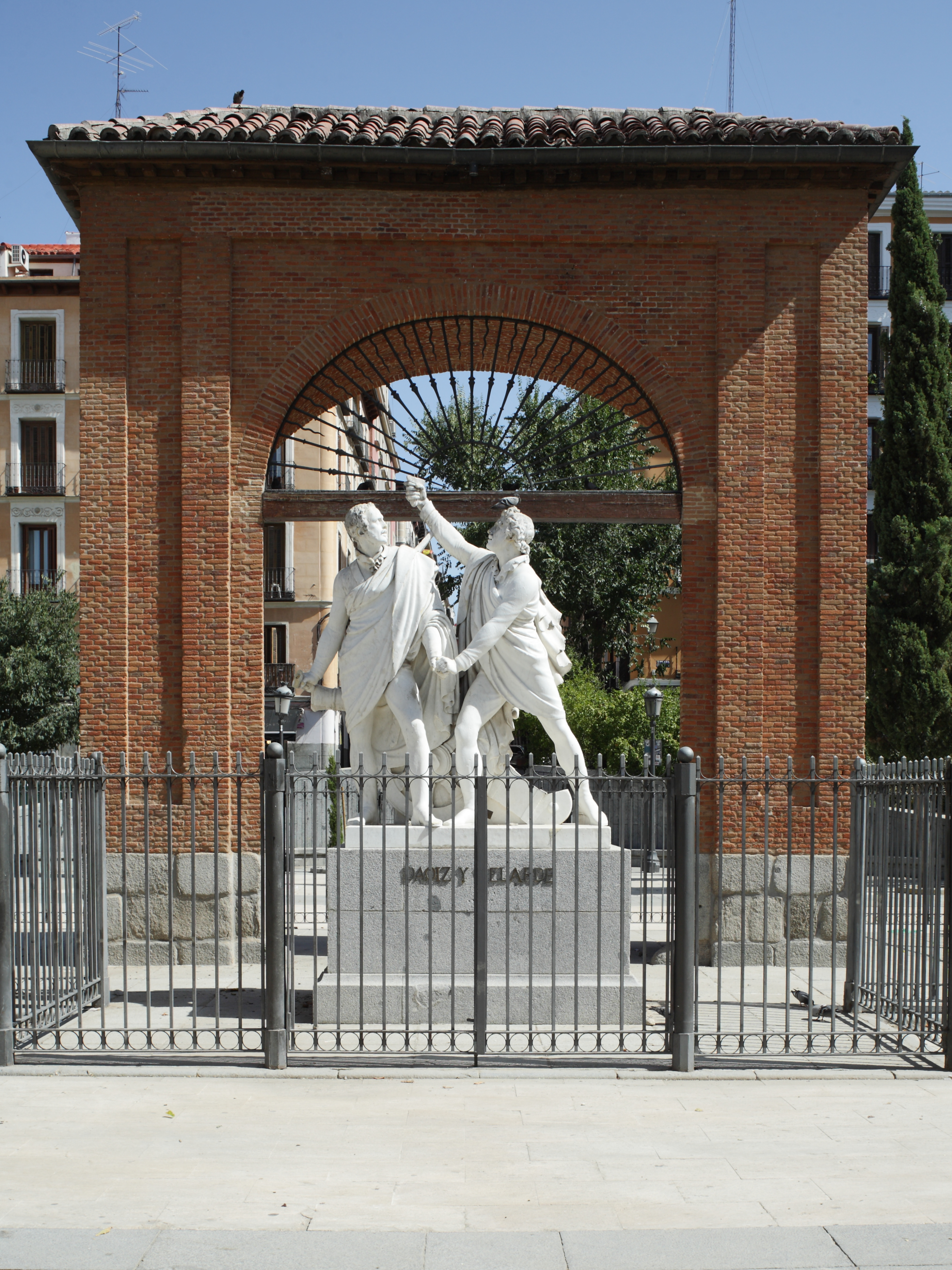
Plaza del Dos de Mayo's center, including the old arch as well as Daoíz and Velarde's sculpture.

The square is the core of the Malasaña neighborhood, surrounded by a number of bars and restaurants. A crafts market takes place here every weekend. The square's center includes an arch, which used to be the old entrance of the Cuartel de Artilleria, as well as a marble sculpture representing Daoíz & Velarde, two Spanish soldiers who fought against the French in the Dos de Mayo Uprising in 1808. Each of the figures used to hold a sword, but due to vandalism, the swords were removed, and both figures can be seen only holding the hilts.
