= Vendrell =

Vendrell is a surname. Notable people with the surname include:

- Joan Maria Vendrell Martínez (born 1976), Spanish ski mountaineer
- Xavier Vendrell (born 1966), Spanish politician
- Fernando Vendrell (born 1962), Portuguese film director and producer
- Carme Solé Vendrell (born 1944), Spanish writer and illustrator
- Francesc Vendrell (1940-2022), Catalan diplomat and ONU representative
- Elmano Vendrell, (1930-2020, Portuguese ophthalmologist
- Armida (actress) - Armida Vendrell (1911–1989), Mexican film actress and singer
- Josep Vendrell, (1882-1950) Spanish army officer and president of FC Barcelona (1943 to 1946)
- Germano Vendrell, (1851-1898) Portuguese writer born in Spain

== See also ==
- El Vendrell, town in Spain
