= Fernando Villalón =

Spanish poet

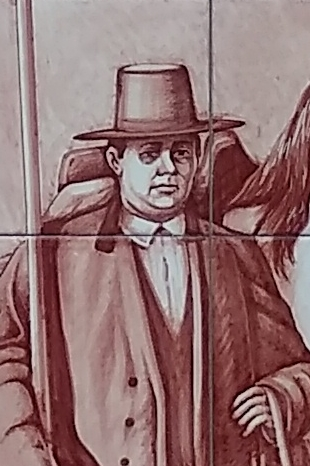
Fernando Villalón (Morón)

Fernando Villalón-Daoíz y Halcón, Count of Miraflores de los Ángeles (Morón de la Frontera, Seville, 31 May 1881 - Madrid, 8 March 1930) was a Spanish poet and bull breeder.

== Biography ==
He attended secondary school in El Puerto de Santa María, where he was a classmate of Juan Ramón Jiménez. He mostly lived in Andalusia and devoted himself to cattle-breeding and agriculture. He was also a compulsive but disorganised reader of cosmogenic, classic and modern poetry, bullfighting and spiritualism. His friends, members of the Generation of '27, especially Rafael Alberti, admired his enormous love of life and generosity. He funded and edited the Papel de Aleluyas, printed in Huelva and Seville from 1927 to 1928. His poetry is imaginative and sometimes anticipated Surrealism. A street is named after him in the Huerta de la Salud district of Seville, along with a cultural foundation in the town of Morón de la Frontera.

== Works ==
- Andalucía la Baja (Madrid, 1927)
- La Toriada (Málaga, 1928)
- Romances del Ochocientos (Málaga, 1929)
- Poesías completas (Madrid, 1944)
