= Morón de la Frontera =

- Municipality
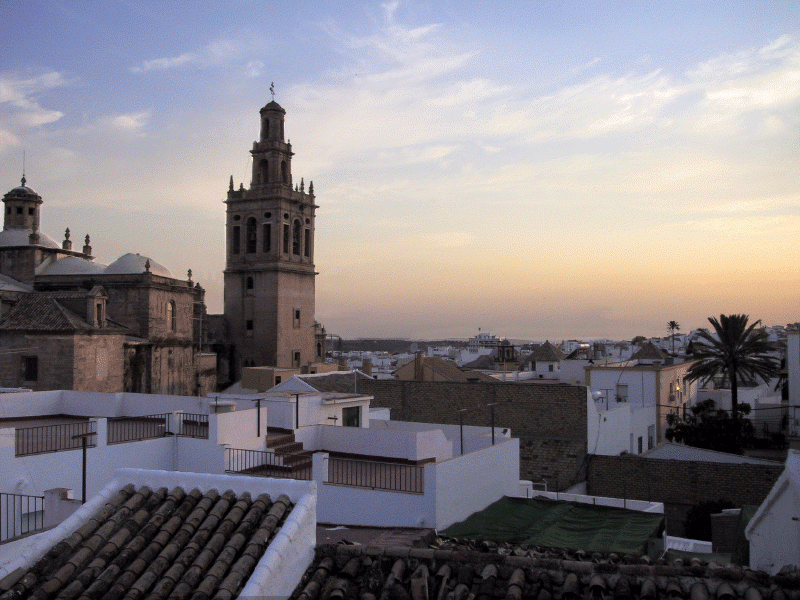

- Flag Coat of arms

- Location in Spain
- Coordinates: 37°7′20″N 5°27′6″W
- Country: Spain
- Autonomous community: Andalusia
- Province: Seville
- Comarca: Campiña de Morón y Marchena
- Judicial district: Morón de la Frontera

Government
  - Alcalde: Juan Manuel Rodríguez (PSOE)

Area
  - Total: 431.94 km^{2} (166.77 sq mi)
- Elevation: 297 m (974 ft)

Population (2025-01-01)
  - Total: 27,210
  - Density: 62.99/km^{2} (163.2/sq mi)
- Demonym(s): Moronero, Moronera / Moronense
- Time zone: UTC+1 (CET)
  - Summer (DST): UTC+2 (CEST)
- Postal code: 41530
- Official language(s): Spanish
- Website: Official website

Morón de la Frontera (Spanish pronunciation: [moˈɾon de la fɾonˈteɾa]) is a Spanish town in Seville province, Andalusia, 57 km (35 mi) south-east of Seville. Situated in the south of the province, it is the center of the region that bears the same name and is the head of one of the 85 judicial courts of Andalucia.

== Geography ==
In the year 2011 there were 28,489 inhabitants. At that time the municipality was 431.94 km^{2} (166.77 sq mi), a population density of 65.96 inhabitants/km^{2}, an average altitude of 297 m (974 ft) and is 67 kilometers (42 mi) from the provincial capital, Seville. Morón de la Frontera is ranked 11th in the municipality of the province in terms of the largest population. It is bordered in the north by Marchena and with Arahal. To the east is La Puebla de Cazalla, and to the west and the south are Montellano, Coripe and Pruna along with the province of Cádiz.

=== Climate ===
The climate of Morón de la Frontera is similar to the rest of the province of Seville, which is similar to other Mediterranean regions. Rain occurs fairly irregularly for most of the year, with the typical driest part of the year being during the summer and the wettest near the end of autumn. According to data from the meteorological station at the air force base from 1981 to 2010, the average annual precipitation was 543.6 mm (21.40 in) and the average relative humidity was 61%. In a typical year, there were 61.1 days with precipitation, and 52.5 days with precipitation more than 1 mm (0.039 in).

There are significant temperature differences between the day and night, and the average annual temperature is 17.9°C. Winters are cool and the summers are generally hot and dry, with the average high temperature being 35 °C and the average low temperature being 18 °C in July. During January and February, the prevailing winds were northeastern while during the rest of the year, especially during May and August, the prevailing winds were southeastern.

Climate data for Morón de la Frontera (1991-2020), extremes (1951-present)
Month	Jan	Feb	Mar	Apr	May	Jun	Jul	Aug	Sep	Oct	Nov	Dec	Year
Record high °C (°F)	27.6 (81.7)	28.6 (83.5)	30.8 (87.4)	37.4 (99.3)	39.7 (103.5)	44.8 (112.6)	46.6 (115.9)	46.0 (114.8)	44.4 (111.9)	36.7 (98.1)	30.0 (86.0)	25.6 (78.1)	46.6 (115.9)
Mean daily maximum °C (°F)	15.9 (60.6)	17.5 (63.5)	20.6 (69.1)	22.8 (73.0)	27.0 (80.6)	31.7 (89.1)	35.4 (95.7)	35.4 (95.7)	30.8 (87.4)	25.8 (78.4)	19.8 (67.6)	16.7 (62.1)	25.0 (76.9)
Daily mean °C (°F)	10.2 (50.4)	11.3 (52.3)	14.1 (57.4)	16.2 (61.2)	19.8 (67.6)	23.9 (75.0)	27.1 (80.8)	27.5 (81.5)	23.9 (75.0)	19.7 (67.5)	14.3 (57.7)	11.5 (52.7)	18.3 (64.9)
Mean daily minimum °C (°F)	4.5 (40.1)	5.1 (41.2)	7.4 (45.3)	9.6 (49.3)	12.6 (54.7)	16.1 (61.0)	18.7 (65.7)	19.5 (67.1)	16.9 (62.4)	13.5 (56.3)	8.7 (47.7)	6.2 (43.2)	11.6 (52.8)
Record low °C (°F)	−8.0 (17.6)	−7.8 (18.0)	−4.2 (24.4)	−0.4 (31.3)	1.6 (34.9)	6.0 (42.8)	3.0 (37.4)	9.0 (48.2)	5.4 (41.7)	1.2 (34.2)	−2.4 (27.7)	−7.0 (19.4)	−8.0 (17.6)
Average precipitation mm (inches)	59.7 (2.35)	47.9 (1.89)	53.5 (2.11)	59.6 (2.35)	37.5 (1.48)	7.3 (0.29)	0.7 (0.03)	1.1 (0.04)	29.7 (1.17)	69.7 (2.74)	71.4 (2.81)	75.8 (2.98)	513.9 (20.24)
Average precipitation days (≥ 1 mm)	6.4	5.5	6.1	6.6	4.3	0.9	0.3	0.3	2.6	6.3	6.4	7.0	52.7
Average relative humidity (%)	74	70	64	61	55	49	44	47	55	63	71	76	61
Mean monthly sunshine hours	183	195	217	246	301	339	369	344	249	226	189	174	3,032
Percentage possible sunshine	60	63	58	62	69	77	82	82	67	65	62	58	67
Source: Agencia Estatal de Meteorologia

=== Flora and fauna ===
The vegetation in the area mainly consists of cultivated olives and, to a lesser extent, oaks and almonds. In the surrounding mountains common flora include rosemary, mastic, thyme, and cane apple. Fauna includes several species of rabbits and hares as well as a large variety of birds.

== History ==
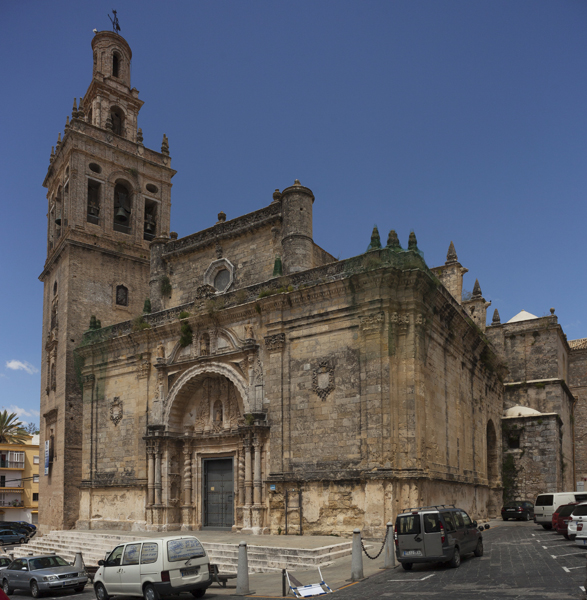
San Miguel church

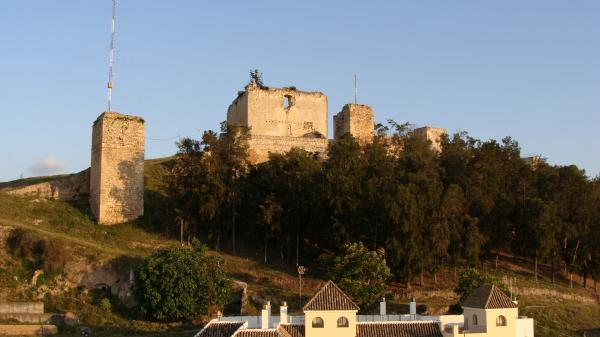
Morón de la Frontera Moorish castle

=== Overview ===
The origins of the city go back to prehistory, with the first human settlement being near the hill where the castle is today. For this reason and the rugged topography of this region, the historical district has steep and narrow roads, but newer sections of the city to the west and northwest have more standard sized roads. Much of the architecture in the city is listed under the categories of Bien de Interés Cultural and conjunto histórico, categories that are part of Spain's national system of heritage listing.

=== Etymology ===
After the Roman conquest of the Iberian peninsula, this placed was called Maurorum, which was a reference to the large population from North Africa. During the Moorish rule of the Iberian Peninsula the Latin term evolved into Mawror, and finally Moron. Though generally less accepted, there is another theory that the name Moron comes from the preromanesque word morr, translated as "rocky hill" or "rock." This has been justified by the rocky terrain around Moron.

The phrase "de la Frontera" or "Of the Border" refers to the border with Granada, because it was a border town between Fernando III's 1240 Christian conquest of Iberia until the fall of the kingdom of Granada in the late fifteenth century.

There are other cities with the same name in Spain, France, Argentina, Cuba, Venezuela, Peru and Mongolia.

== Economy ==
The economy of Morón is primarily based in the industries of construction, and the production of olive oil, cereals and preserved vegetables. The extraction of calcium oxide and, to a lesser extent tourism industry, are also important to the economy. With the development of the working population, more women have been incorporated into the labor market, increasing from 19.56% of women participating in 1981 to 41.42% in 2001. Most of the female workforce is employed in the sale of food and household goods. Many of these women are also employed by the olive industry part-time during the live harvesting season, both for making olive oil, and other olive products.

== Demographics ==
The last census by the national institute of statistics, released January 1, 2011, states that the city has 28 489 inhabitants. In the 20th century, the demographics of the city were affected similarly to other agrarian zones in the province. Remarkably, the population of Morón de la Frontera actually increased during the Spanish Civil War, but this shift also produced a larger ratio of women to men in the city due to the conscription of many military-age men. There was smooth population growth into the 1960s, which was then followed by a sudden decline due to the decreasing birth rate and emigration. Since the late 1980s, the city has maintained slow but stable population growth.

== Symbols ==
=== Flag ===
The flag of Morón de la Frontera is a blue rectangle that contains the municipal coat of arms in the center. It is unknown why the flag is blue or when the flag was adopted by the city.

=== Coat of arms ===
Morón de la Frontera's coat of arms consists of a white horse in reins in front of a red background. the outline of the shield is gold and is topped by a royal crown. The figure of the horse was adopted in the fifteenth century. Though there are several legends about the origin of the figure, most historians agree it is a reference to a type of Berber horse. Nearby cities like Los Corrales, Coripe and Utrera also carry a horse on their shields. The coat of arms is completed with the crown of Henry II of Castile.

The current design was adopted in the year 1970, and is attributed to the painter Joaquín Pascual Alemán. The horse's reins represent the desire for freedom. The figure is based on the equine figures present in the baroque paintings of Diego Velázquez.

=== Representation in the coat of arms of Seville ===
In the coat of arms of the province of shield, the cities with judicial courts are represented by simplified versions of their coat of arms. This arrangement began when the province of Seville was created in 192.

== Landmarks ==
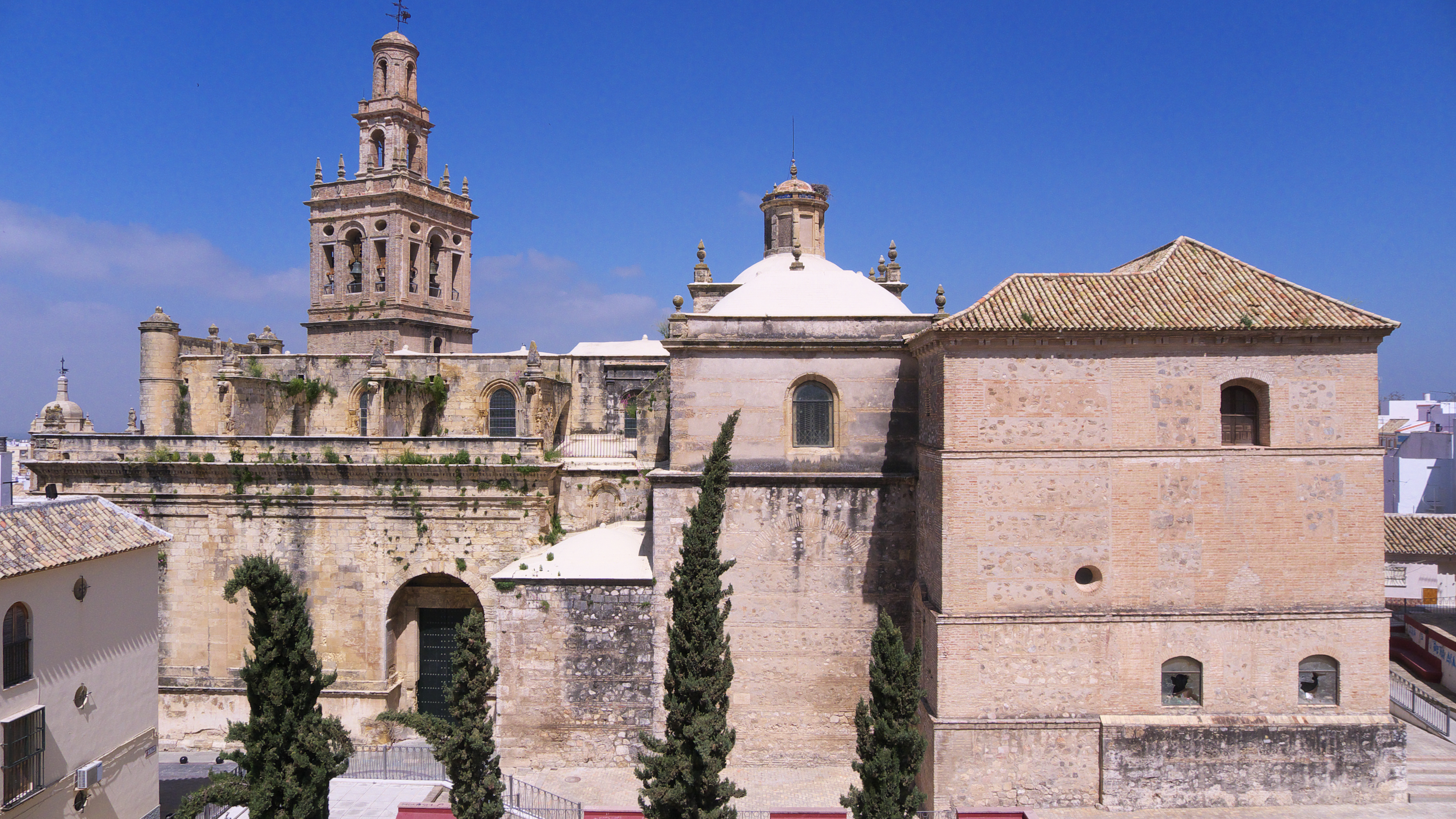
San Miguel church

It is primarily known outside of Spain as being home to Morón Air Base. The most remarkable monuments are the Moorish castle ruins and the main church (San Miguel).

== Famous people ==
- Fernando Villalón, poet
- Diego del Gastor, guitarist
- Ramón Castellano de Torres, historian and painter
- Juan Antonio Carrillo Salcedo, Law teacher
- Capitan Bartolome Gonzalez y Olivarez, born circa 1615, founder of one of the González branches of Nuevo León, Tamaulipas, Texas and the U.S. Southwest.

== Sister cities ==
- Abanilla, Spain.
- Dos Torres, Spain.
- Morón, Cuba.
- La Romana, Dominican Republic.
- Strabane, United Kingdom.

== See also ==
- List of municipalities in Seville
