= El Vendrell =

- Municipality
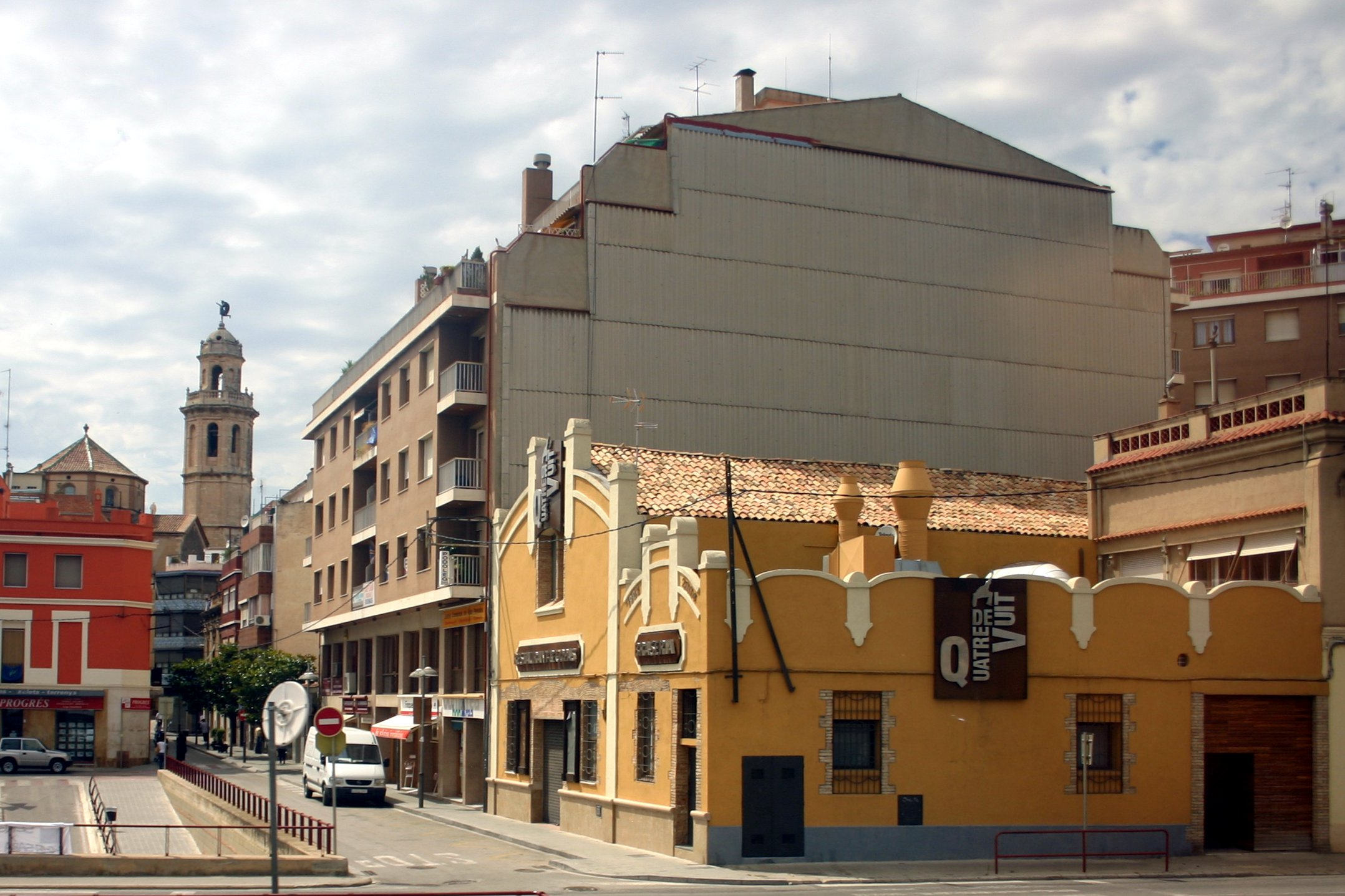
- El Vendrell

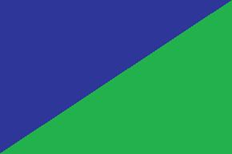
- Flag Coat of arms

- Location in Catalonia
- Coordinates: 41°13′13″N 1°32′05″E
- Country: Spain
- Community: Catalonia
- Province: Tarragona
- Comarca: Baix Penedès

Government
  - Mayor: Kenneth Martínez, del PSC (2019)

Area
  - Total: 36.8 km^{2} (14.2 sq mi)
- Elevation: 10 m (33 ft)

Population (2025-01-01)
  - Total: 41,133
  - Density: 1,120/km^{2} (2,890/sq mi)
- Climate: Csa
- Website: elvendrell.net

El Vendrell (Catalan pronunciation: [əl βənˈdɾeʎ], Spanish: [el βenˈdɾeʎ]) is a town located in the province of Tarragona, Catalonia, in the wine-growing region of Penedès. It is wedged between the Mediterranean and the coastal range. El Vendrell is the capital of the Baix Penedès comarca and a tourist spot, with the beaches of Comarruga, Sant Salvador and El Vendrell.

It is the source of the Catalan family name "Vendrell".

== Notable people from El Vendrell ==
- Pau Casals
- Àngel Guimerà
- Andreu Nin
- Josep Nin i Tudó
- Manuel Nin

== Demographics ==
It has a population of 41,133 (register office, 2025).

1900	1930	1950	1970	1986	2014
5,103	5,081	5,224	8,903	13,448	n/a

== Sports ==
The city has a roller hockey team, Club d'Esports Vendrell, one of the most important in Spain, which plays in the main League OK Liga.

The city also has two amateur football clubs, Club d'Esports Vendrell (CD Vendrell) and UE Tancat. Both are members of the Federació Catalana de Futbol.

== Bibliography ==
- Panareda Clopés, Josep Maria; Rios Calvet, Jaume; Rabella Vives, Josep Maria (1989). Guia de Catalunya, Barcelona: Caixa de Catalunya. ISBN 84-87135-01-3 (Spanish). ISBN 84-87135-02-1 (Catalan).
