= Monumento a los Caídos por España (Madrid) =

War memorial in Madrid, Spain

Monument to the Fallen for Spain
- Monumento a los Caídos por España
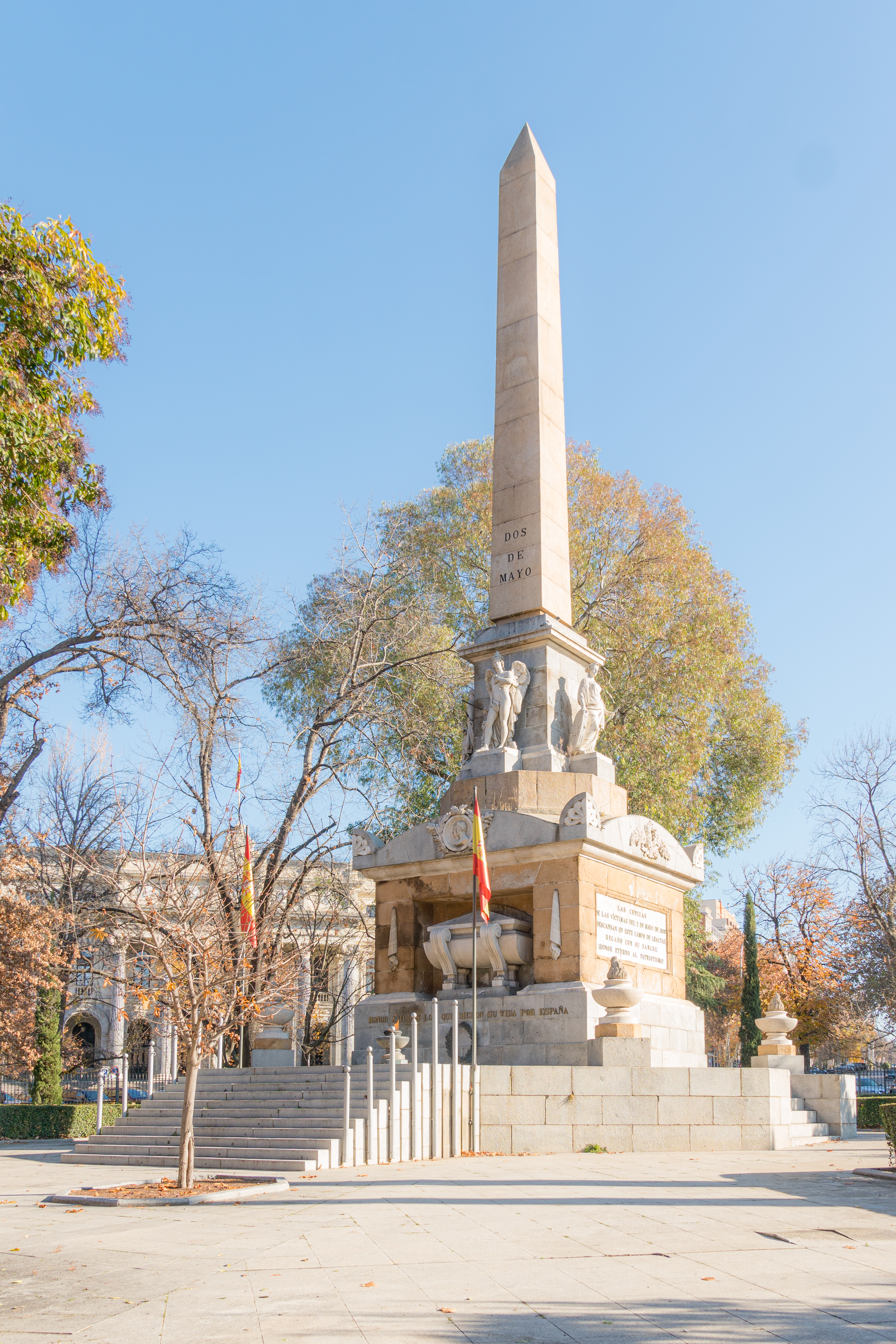
- 40.41638°N 3.69289°W
- Location: Plaza de la Lealtad, Madrid, Spain
- Designer: Isidro González Velázquez
- Height: c. 30 m
- Opening date: 2 May 1840
- Dedicated to: Those who gave their life for Spain

The Monument to the Fallen for Spain (Spanish: Monumento a los Caídos por España) or the Monument to the Heroes of the Second of May (Monumento a los Héroes del Dos de Mayo), popularly known as el Obelisco ("the Obelisk"), is a war memorial in Madrid, Spain. It lies on the centre of the Plaza de la Lealtad.

== History and description ==
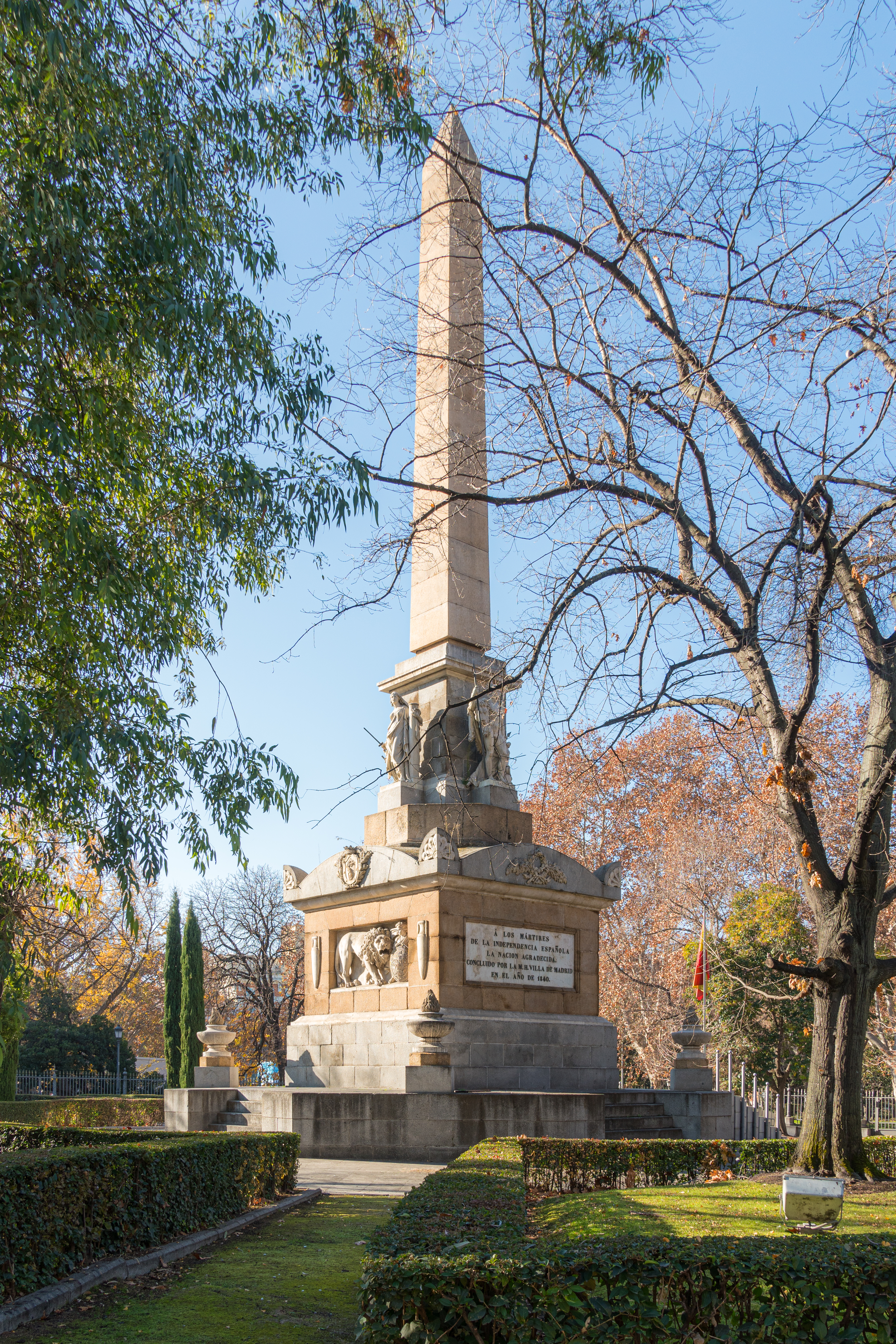
Plaque reads: To the martyrs of the Spanish Independence, a thankful nation. Concluded by the Most Honorable Village of Madrid in the year 1840.

It is located at the Plaza de la Lealtad, between the Madrid Stock Exchange Building and the Ritz Hotel, next to the Paseo del Prado.

Standing close to 30 metres high, the monument is built on the place where General Joachim Murat ordered the execution of numerous Spaniards after the Dos de Mayo Uprising of 1808. After various attempts to create a memorial as an homage to the participants of the uprising, the inauguration of the monument took place on May 2, 1840, the anniversary of the event. On November 22, 1985, King Juan Carlos I re-inaugurated the monument as a memorial to all those who gave their life for Spain, including those who died in conflicts other than the Peninsular War. Since then, a flame fueled by gas has been constantly burning on the front of the monument. This parallels other war memorials around the world of national symbolic importance, such as the Tomb of the Unknown Soldier.
