= Obus =

The Obus (French for "cannon shell") was a French automobile manufactured from 1907 until 1908. A voiturette, it was produced by A. Souriau of Montoire.
