= Countship of Miraflores de los Angeles =

The Countship of Miraflores de los Angeles (Condado de Miraflores de los Ángeles) is a comital title granted by Charles II of Spain on 28 November 1689 to Juan de Torres de Navarra y de la Vega Ponce de León (died 1719), with the previous title Vizconde de la Vega. Its name refers to Miraflores de los Ángeles, a district of the town of Málaga.

== Counts of Miraflores de los Ángeles ==
- Juan de Torres de Navarra y de la Vega Ponce de León, 1st count of Miraflores de los Ángeles (died 1719);
- [...], 2nd count of Miraflores de los Ángeles;
- Bartolomé de Torres de Navarra y Ponce de León, 3rd count of Miraflores de los Ángeles (a quién en 1729 Felipe V le confirmó el título como hereditario perpetuo);
- [...], 4th count of Miraflores de los Ángeles;
- Ignacio de Torres de Navarra Ponce de León y Villalón (died 1852), 5th count of Miraflores de los Ángeles, son of María Josefa Villalón and Auñón, married Mª del Carmen Auñón y Angulo. Succeeded by his son:
- Francisco Javier de Torres de Navarra y Auñón, 6th count of Miraflores de los Ángeles, born 1805, married his first cousin Mª Josefa de León y Villalón. Succeeded by:
- Andrés Villalón-Daoiz y Torres de Navarra, 7th count of Miraflores de los Ángeles. Succeeded by his son:
- Fernando Villalón-Daoiz y Halcón (1881-1930), 8th count of Miraflores de los Ángeles, poet. Succeeded by his brother:
- Jerónimo Villalón-Daoiz y Halcón, 9th count of Miraflores de los Ángeles. Marquessate of Villar del Tajo revived for him 9 April 1921. Married Mª Teresa Sánchez de Ibargüen y Villalón-Daoiz. Elder brother of the Real Maestranza de Caballería de Sevilla;
- Ignacio Sánchez de Ibargüen y Benjumea, current count of Miraflores de los Ángeles, from 29 November 1995.
