= Luis Daoíz y Torres =

Spanish Army officer

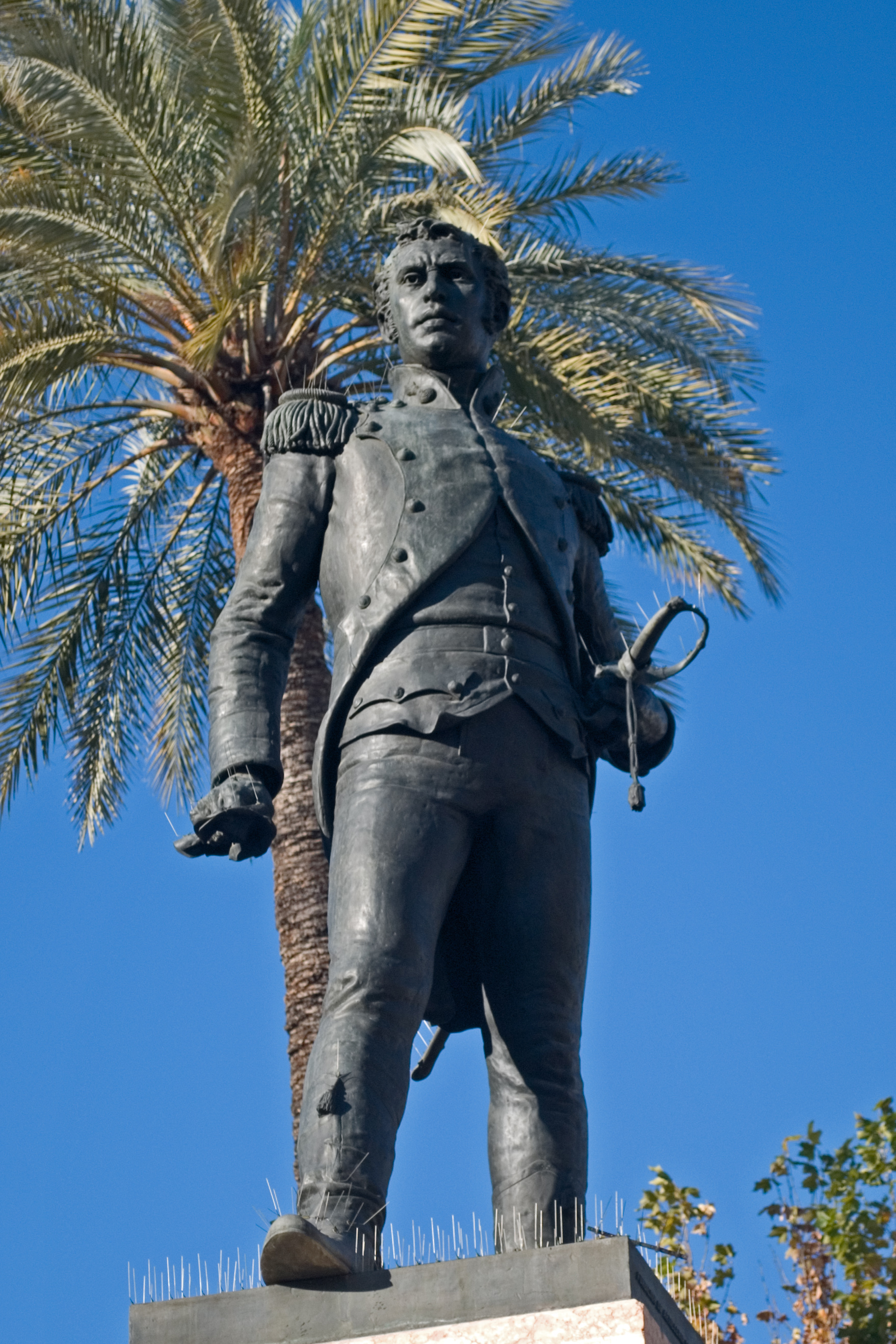
- A statue of Daoíz in Seville showing him in the act of refusing his orders from the junta and resolving to fight the French
- Born: Luis Gonzaga Guillermo Escolástica Manuel José Joaquín Ana y Juan de la Soledad Daoíz Torres; 10 February 1767; Seville, Spain
- Died: 2 May 1808 (aged 41); Madrid, Spain
- Burial place: Monumento a los Caídos por España
- Military career
- Allegiance: Kingdom of Spain
- Branch: Spanish Army
- Service years: 1782–1808
- Rank: Captain
- Conflicts: War of the Pyrenees; Anglo-Spanish War (1796–1808); Assault on Cádiz (1797); Peninsular War; Dos de Mayo Uprising

Captain Luis Daoiz y Torres (10 February 1767 – 2 May 1808) was a Spanish Army officer who was one of the leaders of the Dos de Mayo Uprising which resulted in the outbreak of the Spanish War of Independence. His surname was derived from the town of Aoiz in Navarre and he was descended from a long line of Spanish gentry with military service dating to the Reconquista. Daoíz's great grandfather married the daughter of the Count of Miraflores de los Angeles and he spent much of his early life in palaces owned by the family.

Born in Seville, after receiving a Catholic education Daoiz trained at the Royal School of Artillery in Segovia. He saw action against Moroccan forces in North Africa, where Daoiz was commended for his bravery and promoted to lieutenant. After serving against the French in the short-lived War of the Pyrenees, he was captured. After refusing to serve in the French army, Daoiz was imprisoned.

After his release he served on secondment to the Spanish Navy during the Anglo-Spanish War, participating in the defence of Cádiz and on convoy duty in the Atlantic Ocean, for which Daoiz was promoted to captain. Tiring of naval service, he rejoined his artillery regiment. His subsequent duties included assisting in the manufacture of new guns for horse artillery units, attending the signing of the Treaty of Fontainebleau with France and participating in the invasion of Portugal in 1807.

Daoiz returned to Madrid in 1808 and was a leader of the uprising on 2 May in which he assisted civilians resisting French efforts to forcibly relocate the Spanish royal family. His defence of the barracks at Monteleón was the only instance on that day in which the Spanish army fought the French and, although ultimately unsuccessful, it inspired a country-wide uprising against France. Daoiz died in the fighting and was subsequently commemorated as a national hero.

== Ancestry ==
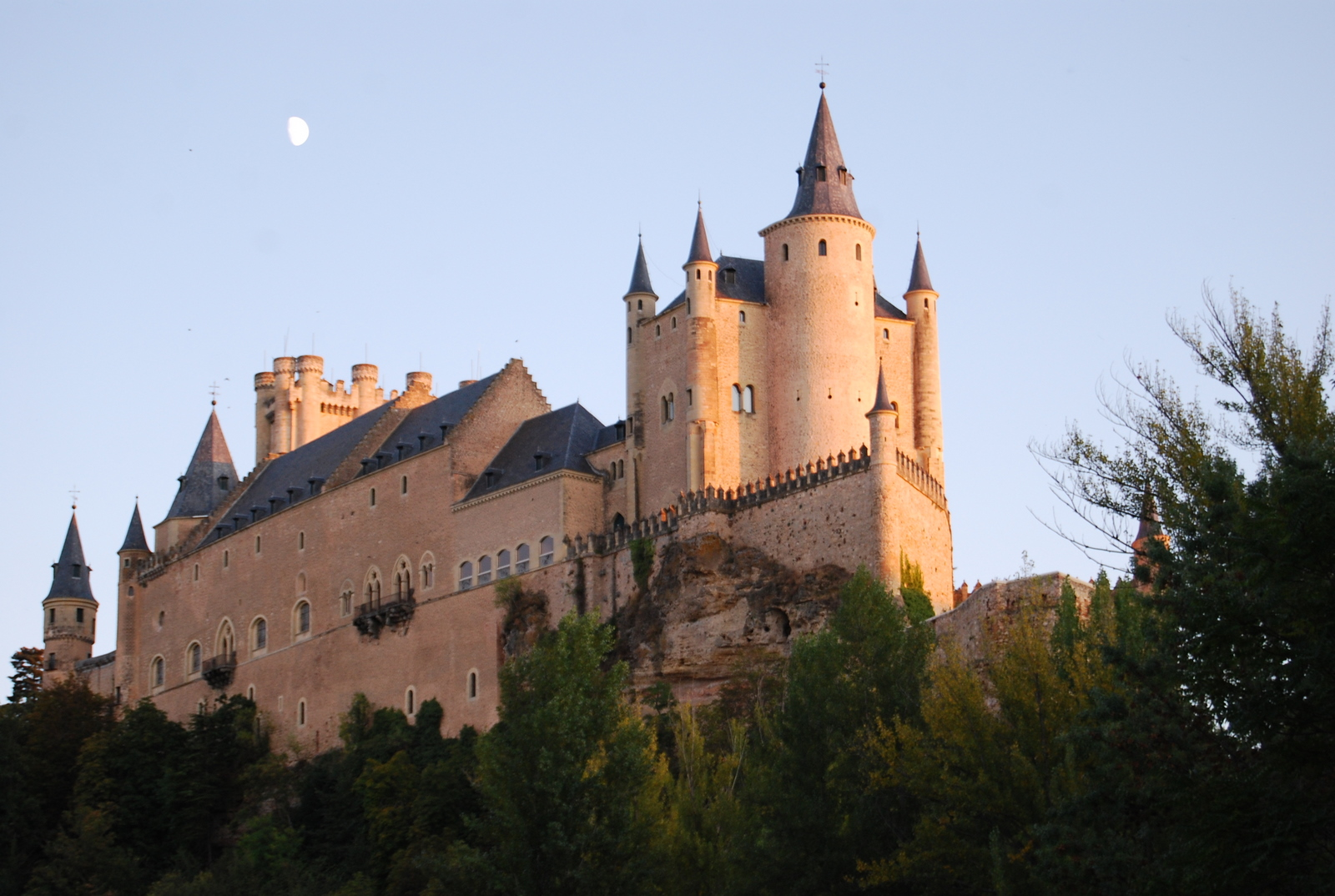
The Alcázar of Segovia, home of the Royal School of Artillery

Luis's oldest known ancestor is Don Berenguer D'Aoiz, who was named for the town of Aoiz in Navarre and fought in the Reconquista of Spain from the Moors. Members of the family subsequently served in the militia, including Don García Garcés D'Aoiz who fought at the Battle of Las Navas de Tolosa in 1212, a decisive Christian victory and a turning point in the Reconquista. Other ancestors fought in the 15th century Granada War, the 16th century conquest of Naples and in 17th century Flanders. Luis's great grandfather, Joaquín D'Aoiz, was sheriff of Gibraltar in 1704 when the territory was captured and occupied by Anglo-Dutch forces, the family subsequently moving to El Puerto de Santa María and changing their surname to Daoíz. Joaquín's grandson Martin married Francisca Torres Ponce de León, daughter of the Count of Miraflores de los Angeles, in 1766 and their son Luis was born in a palace owned by the Miraflores family in Calle del Horno, Seville.

== Early life ==
Luis Daoíz was born on 10 February 1767 and baptised the same day as "Luis Gonzaga Guillermo Escolástica Manuel José Joaquín Ana y Juan de la Soledad Daoíz Torres". Daoíz lived for much of his childhood at the palace in Calle del Horno, spending some of his summers at a house in Calle Iglesia (now renamed Calle de Daoíz) in Mairena del Alcor. He was educated at the Colegio de San Hermenegildo Jesuit college in Seville up to the age of 15, when his parents decided that he would become an officer in the Spanish Army, which their families considered a career suitable for a gentleman. Daoíz's father was able to arrange the necessary paperwork for him to enter the elitist artillery corps which only permitted noblemen to take commissions.

Daoíz entered the Royal School of Artillery at Segovia as a cadet on 10 February 1782 and graduated as an ensign on 9 February 1787. According to his entrance report he had a dark complexion, brown hair, large eyes and a small stature, being less than five feet tall. At the school Daoíz excelled at mathematics and sports, in particular saber fencing and was able to speak French, English, Italian and Latin in addition to his native Spanish. After graduation Daoíz was assigned to the Real Regimiento de Artillería (Royal Regiment of Artillery) at Puerto de Santa Maria. He was able to use a considerable private income from property and farms owned by his family around Gibraltar to supplement his official salary.

== Army career ==
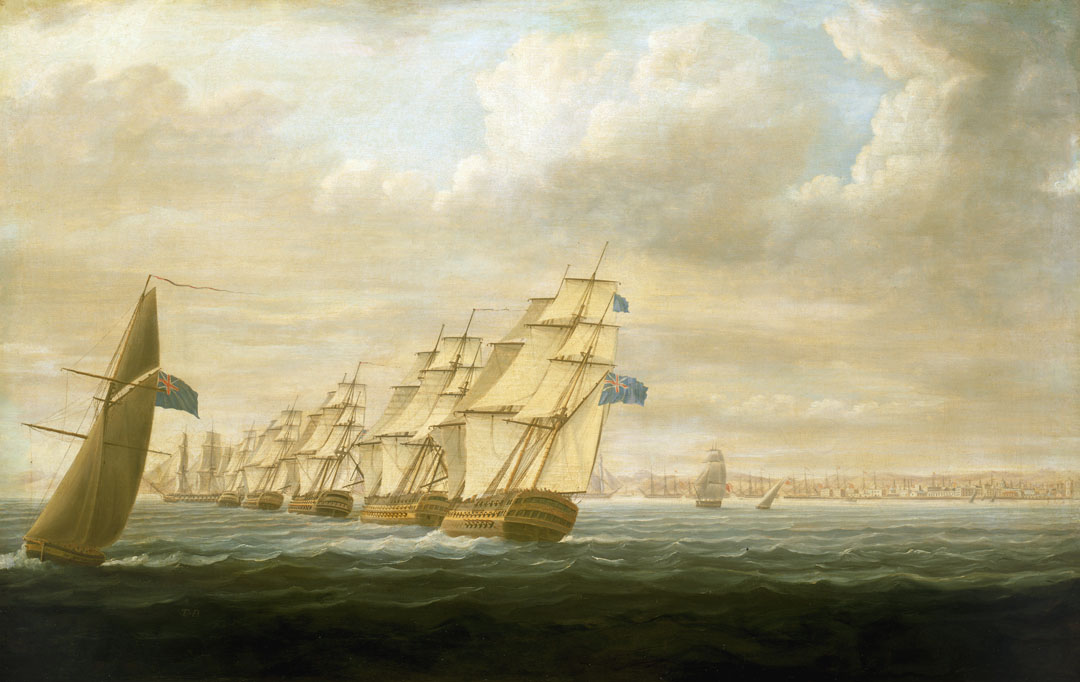
The British blockading squadron off Cádiz

Daoíz volunteered to help defend Ceuta against Moroccan forces in 1790 and was given command of an artillery battery. He remained in North Africa to assist with the defence of Oran in 1791, spending part of the time with a unit of miners. Daoíz was commended by his superiors, including artillery Brigadier Andres Aznar, for his courage and zeal in the battles and was promoted to lieutenant on 28 February 1792. After Spain joined the First Coalition against the French First Republic, Daoíz begin fighting in the War of the Pyrenees in March 1794 but was captured in a French counterattack on 25 November. He was held as a prisoner of war at Toulouse where he turned down an offer of freedom and a commission in the French Revolutionary Army, which was short of artillery officers. After the Peace of Basel ended the war between France and Spain on 22 July 1795, Daoíz was released and made his way back to El Puerto de Santa Maria.

Spain signed the Second Treaty of San Ildefonso in 1795, allying itself with France against Great Britain and beginning the Anglo-Spanish War a year later. On 11 July 1797, Daoíz was placed in charge of a gunboat in the defence of Cádiz under by Admiral Jose de Mazarredo y Salazar against a blockading squadron of the British Royal Navy. During the engagement his gunboat was involved in an attack on the British ship of the line HMS Powerful. Later that year he was seconded to the Spanish Navy, which was short of trained officers, for service aboard the 74-gun ship of the line San Ildefonso. Daoíz sailed twice with the vessel to the Americas, escorting galleons. During this time he assisted the ship's captain, Jose de Iriarte, by acting as a translator during negotiations with foreign officials and found time to write a short treatise on the instruction of soldiers and sailors. Whilst with the ship in Havana in November 1800 Daoíz was reading back issues of a gazette and was surprised to find that he had been promoted to captain on 4 March 1800, whilst at sea. He did not enjoy the long trips away from Spain and requested a land based posting, serving initially as a lieutenant in the infantry before joining the newly formed 3rd Artillery Regiment of Seville on 7 July 1802. Had he stayed aboard the San Ildefonso Daoíz may have seen action with the ship at the Battle of Trafalgar on 21 October 1805.

On 2 December 1803 Daoíz was ordered by Manuel de Godoy to be seconded to the Royal Bronze Foundry. There he sat on a committee, headed by Brigadier Maria Vicente Maturana, to decide the design and oversee the production of new light guns for horse artillery units. Daoíz agreed to wed a noblewoman from Utrera in 1807, the marriage ceremony taking place in spring the next year. In 1807 Daoíz was commander of the Spanish artillerymen that attended the signing of the Treaty of Fontainebleau, an agreement between Spain and France to split up Portugal into three smaller states, and was part of the Franco-Spanish force that invaded and occupied Portugal. He moved with his regiment to Madrid in 1808 and took command of a battery of the 2nd company (some sources say 3rd company) at the former palace of the Duke of Monteleón. He became known to the men under his command as "el Abuelo" ("the grandfather") due to his relative age and good temperament.

== Dos de Mayo ==
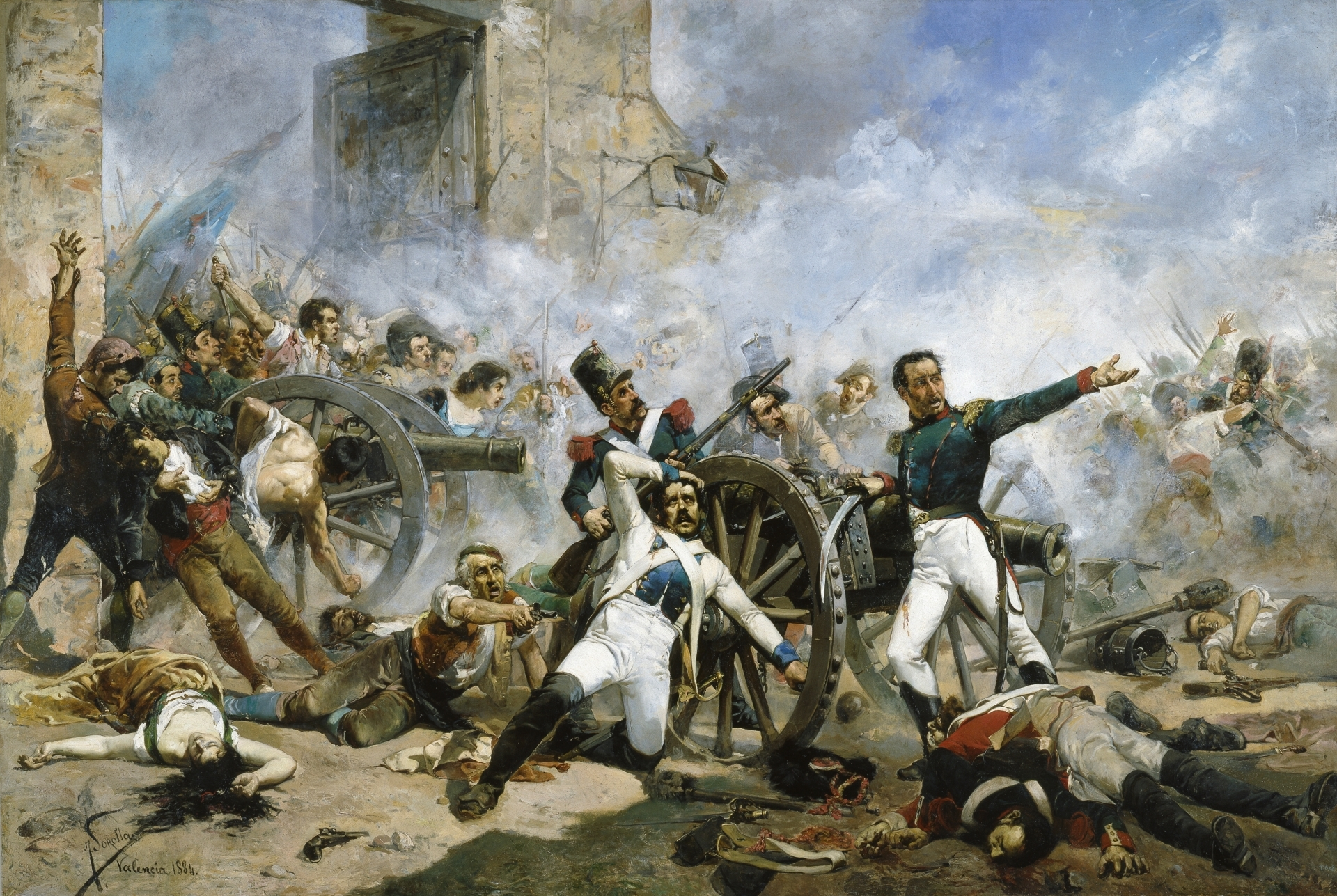
Joaquín Sorolla's depiction of the defence of Monteleón

As part of the Treaty of Fontainebleau, French troops began to arrive in Spain and occupy strategic points. Marshal Joachim Murat was ordered to Madrid with 30,000 troops and began taking control of the main palaces and barracks of the city, which had just 2-4,000 Spanish troops in its garrison. The presence of a French garrison was resented by much of the populace and Daoíz himself had to be restrained from fighting a duel with a French soldier he overheard insulting Spain in a tavern. On 2 May a crowd, hearing of French plans to send members of the Spanish royal family away to France, gathered outside the Royal Palace in Madrid to protest. It is not known how the fighting started, but British consul John Hunter recorded that by 11 am French troops were firing musket volleys into the crowded square and fighting had spread across Madrid. French troops were dispatched to take possession of the Spanish barracks to secure their arms and ammunition.

Daoíz, the highest-ranking officer at the Monteleón barracks found himself in command of just 4 officers, 3 NCOs and 10 men. He sought reinforcements at his regimental headquarters and returned with the 3rd company of the 2nd Battalion, a further 33 men and 2 officers. Daoíz's orders from the local junta were to remain in the barracks and co-operate with French forces but, after conferring with Captain Pedro Velarde y Santillán, he decided that the French troops were hostile to Spain and that they would defend the barracks against any French interference. By this time a large crowd of civilians had gathered at the barracks, requesting weapons with which to oppose the French, and Daoíz ordered the armoury opened to them. With 9 cannon, and 120 soldiers and armed civilians under his command, Daoíz now made arrangements for the defence of the barracks. A battery of 24-pounder guns were placed at the main gate facing into the street and were loaded with canister shot by their military and civilian crews. A small detachment of French stationed near the barracks were captured by Verlarde and their weapons and ammunition distributed to civilians.

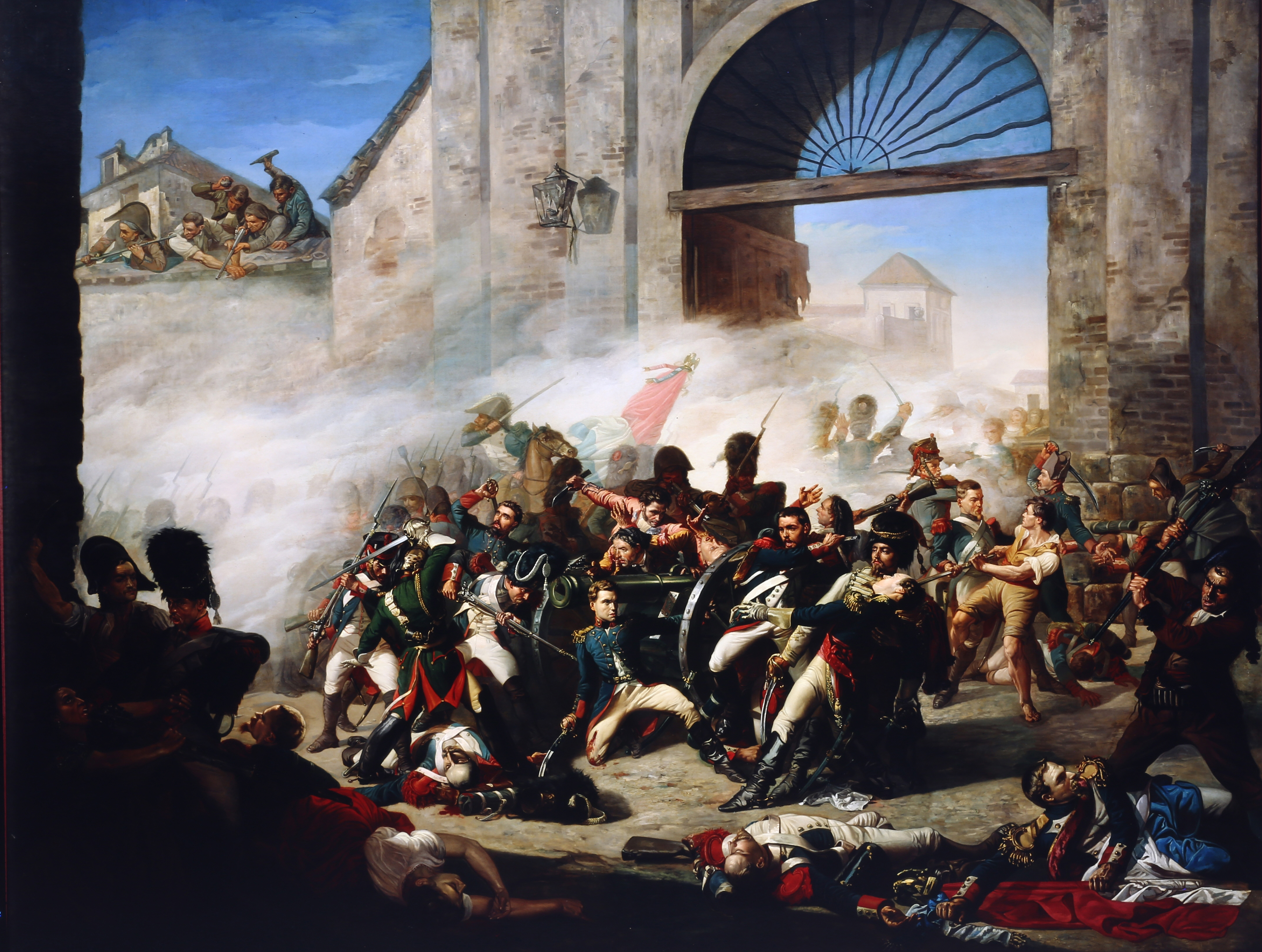
Manuel Castellano's 1862 painting of Daoíz (centre) receiving his fatal wound

According to Hunter, when the first French troops advanced up the street to take possession of the barracks, they were fired upon and several were killed before they halted to await reinforcements and occupy neighbouring buildings. Soon the French commanding officer, General Joseph Lagrange, had around 2,000 men in the area. French battalions, including a unit of Imperial Grenadiers, made two assaults on the guns, but both were repulsed, and the Spaniards captured a French colonel. A third wave of French troops reached the artillery lines and fired into the barracks, killing many of the defenders including Velarde, before charging with fixed bayonets. Hunter claimed that Daoíz, who had been shot in the hip, continued to issue orders despite his wound and was wounded twice more whilst fighting the French with his sabre. Daoíz is said to have been stabbed in the back with a bayonet and killed whilst approaching a French officer waving a white flag of truce. The dying Daoíz was dragged away by his men, who continued to fight within the barracks buildings before surrendering at the request of Spanish Captain-General the Marquis de San Simón. The Spanish at Monteleón had held out against superior French numbers for around three hours. Daoíz was 41 years old when he died, and had over 26 years of continuous service in the Spanish Army.

== Aftermath ==
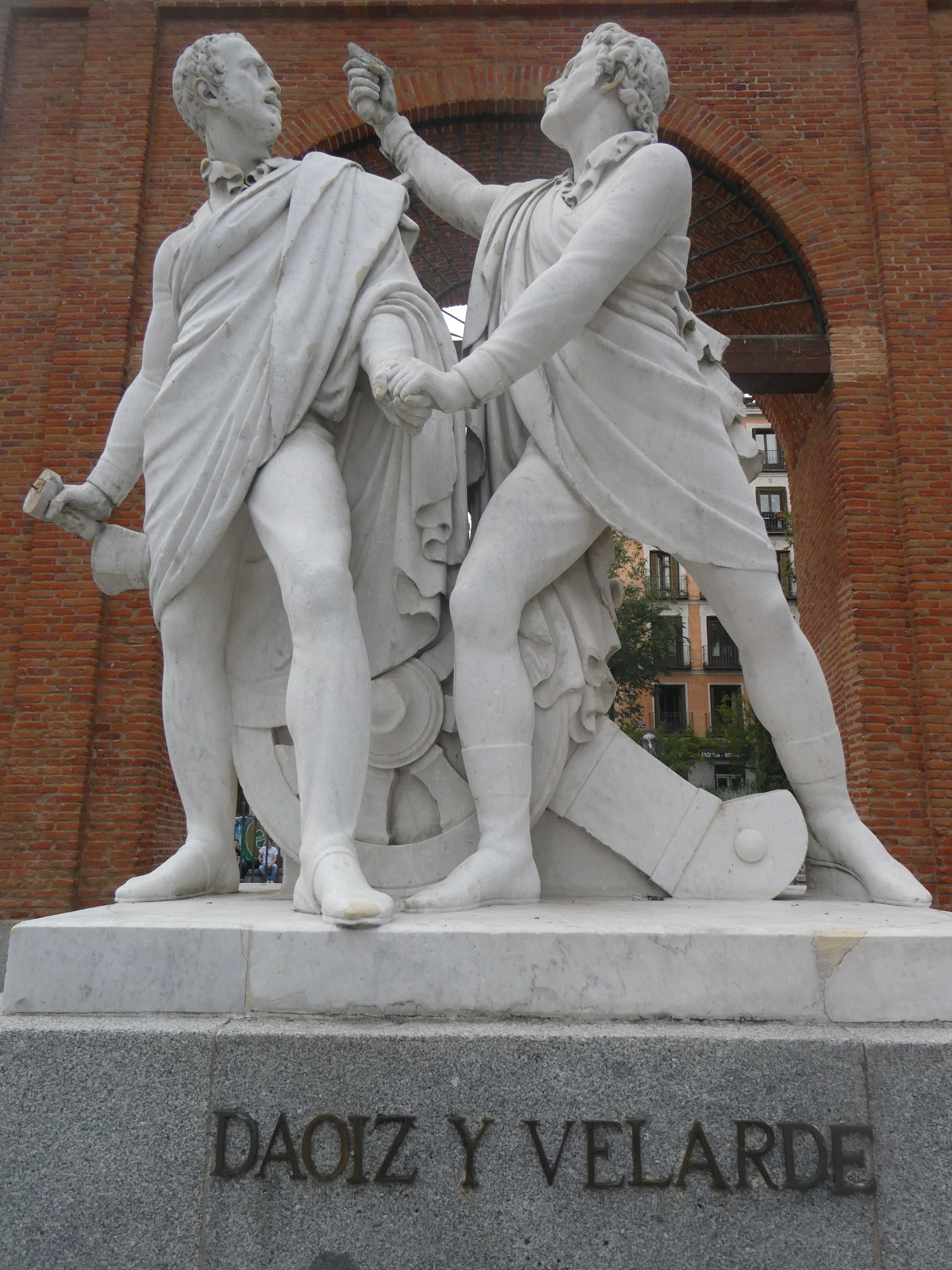
Monument to Daoíz and Velarde in Madrid

The French surgeon is said to have insisted on treating Daoíz before tending to his own men, but his efforts were in vain and Daoíz was buried in the Church of St Martin alongside his men. Velarde, who spearheaded the uprising alongside Daoíz, was also killed, but another artillery officer, Lieutenant Ruiz, managed to escape. Members of the Junta went around the city asking for resistance to stop, and by 2am the next morning calm had been restored.

Marshal Murat convened a military tribunal, chaired by General Emmanuel Grouchy, that morning to summarily try and sentence anyone found in possession of a potential weapon. Many Spaniards lost their lives, and artist Francisco Goya, who witnessed the aftermath of the executions, painted his famous painting The Third of May 1808 to commemorate this event. The fighting and executions claimed at least 154 French and 409 Spanish lives and inspired resistance to the French across the country, signalling the start of the Spanish War of Independence. After Daoíz's death his wife entered a convent in Seville.

== Legacy ==
Daoíz is commemorated as a leader of the initial resistance against French rule in Spain and, along with Velarde, is remembered in many monuments across the country. The ashes of Daoíz and Velarde, with those of others involved in the Dos de Mayo uprising, were transferred to the Monumento a los Caidos por España in Madrid after its construction in 1840. The monument originally served as a memorial to those who lost their lives on the Dos de Mayo but on 22 November 1985 King Juan Carlos I redesignated it in memory of all Spaniards who died in war and it now serves as Spain's national Tomb of the Unknown Soldier.

In 1852 a plaque was erected on the spot where Daoíz's house stood in Seville, being replaced in 1869 by a twice lifesize statue depicting the pivotal moment of the Dos de Mayo when Daoíz decided to disobey his orders and resist the French. A monument commemorating the "Martyrs of Liberty" who died on 2 and 3 May stands on the spot of Murat's executions and contains representations of both Daoíz and Velarde. A monument to Daoíz also stands in Segovia, where he studied at the artillery academy and in Madrid the two statues of lions that stand outside of the Spanish Congress of Deputies building are popularly known as Daoíz and Velarde. The Premio Daoíz military honour is awarded once every five years to an artillery officer in the Spanish Army. The award in memory of Daoíz is for services to the nation in the preceding five years and the honorary sabre is presented by the monarch in a ceremony held at the Alcázar of Segovia on 2 May.
