= Dos de Mayo Uprising =

1808 rebellion during the Peninsular War

Dos de Mayo
- Part of the Peninsular War
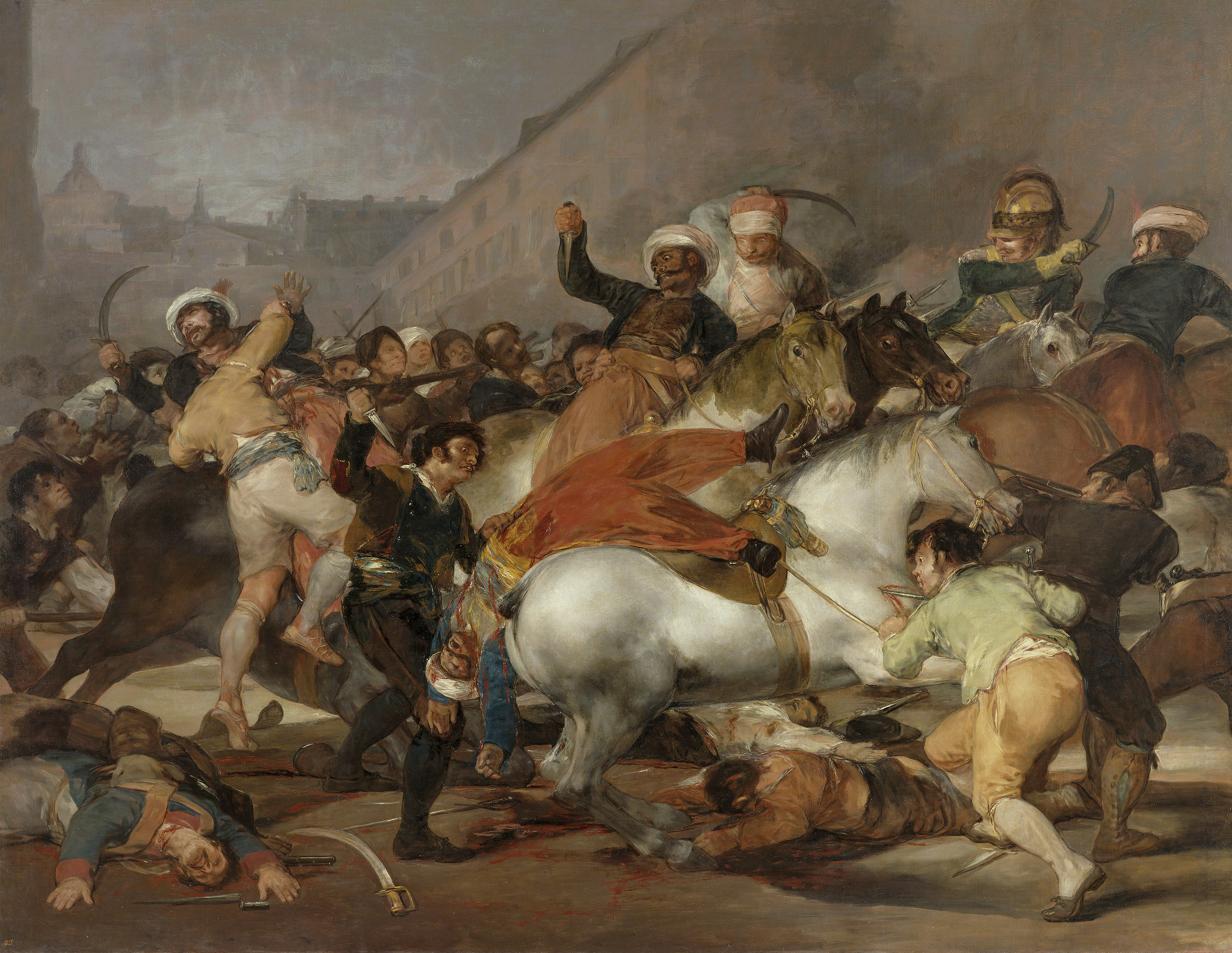
- The Second of May 1808; Francisco de Goya, 1814
Date	2 May 1808
Location	Madrid, Spain 40°25′N 3°42′W
Result	French victory: Uprising suppressed but people's revolt spreads throughout Spain; Mass executions in reprisal; Outbreak of the Peninsular War; End of the Franco-Spanish alliance in the Napoleonic Wars

Belligerents
(First French Empire) France	Spain

Commanders and leaders
(First French Empire) Joachim Murat	Pedro Velarde y Santillán †; Luís Daoíz de Torres †

Casualties and losses
31 killed, wounded or captured or 150 dead or: 31 dead, 114 wounded	200 killed, wounded or captured or: 200 dead, 200 wounded, 300 executed

Peninsular War: Spain
current battle
Wellington in command
Wellington not in command

The Dos de Mayo or Second of May Uprising took place in Madrid, Spain, on 2–3 May 1808. The rebellion, mainly by civilians, with some isolated military action by junior officers, was against the occupation of the city by French troops, and was violently repressed by the French Imperial forces, with hundreds of public executions. These actions led to the Spanish people revolting against French occupation and outbreak of the Peninsular War, and ended the Franco-Spanish alliance in the Napoleonic Wars.

== Background ==
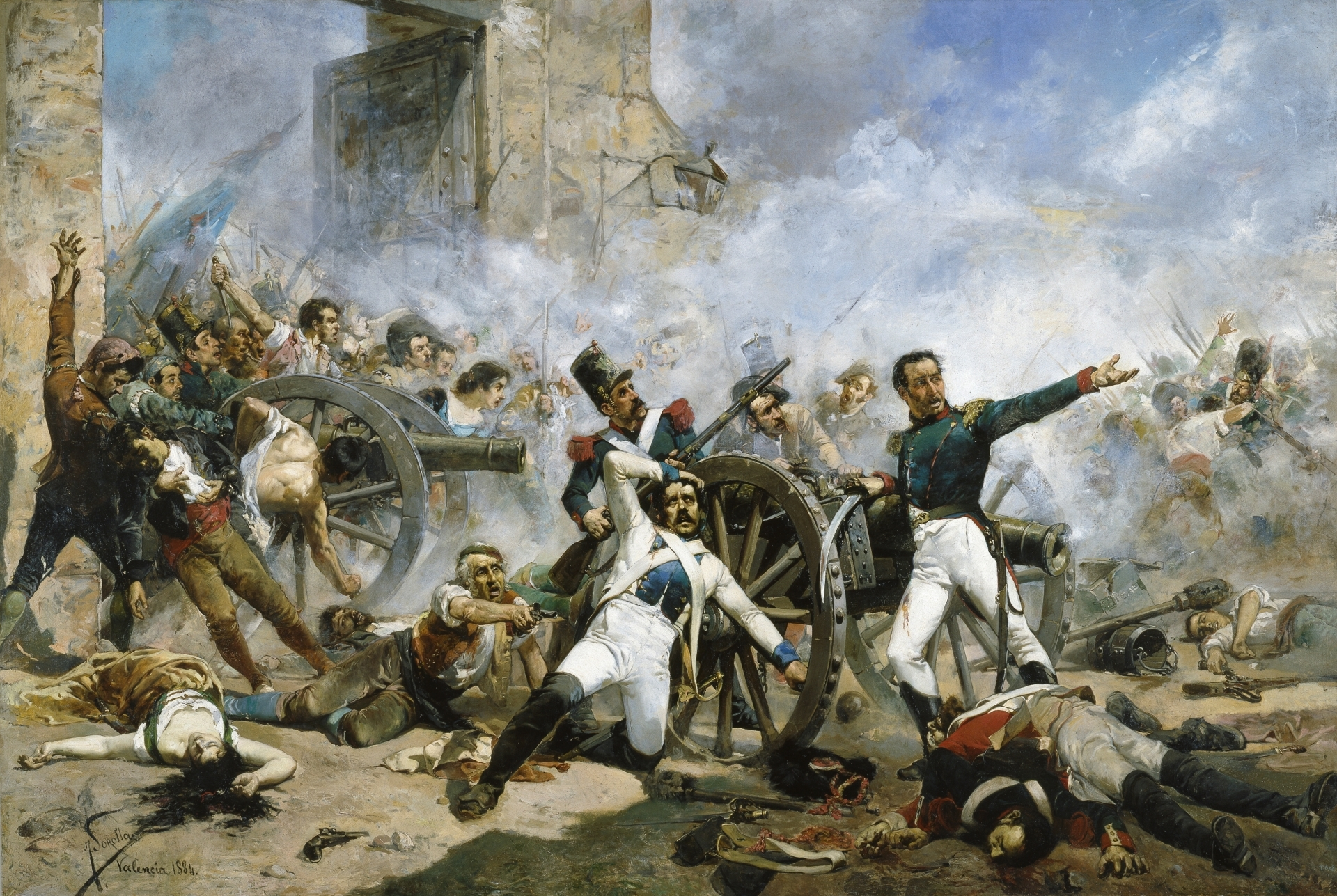
Second of May 1808: Pedro Velarde y Santiyán takes his last stand.

The city had been under the occupation of Napoleon's army since 23 March of the same year. King Charles IV had been forced by the Spanish people during the Tumult of Aranjuez to abdicate in favor of his son Ferdinand VII, and at the time of the uprising both were in the French city of Bayonne at the insistence of Napoleon. An attempt by the French general Joachim Murat to move Charles IV's daughter and her children along with his youngest son to Bayonne sparked a rebellion.

=== Social aspects ===
The Dos de Mayo was among the few spontaneous popular uprisings of the war, launched without significant fore-planning, funding, or leadership by government elites. While elements within the Spanish military and state bureaucracy did envision military action to expel the French from the country, Murat's hold on Madrid was held to be unassailable in the short term. The two most senior uniformed leaders involved in the Dos de Mayo, Daoíz and Velarde y Santillán, were caught unprepared by the actions of the laboring poor: Velarde, a 28-year-old artillery captain, was secretly plotting a campaign elsewhere in the country, but considered a direct attack on the Spanish capital impractical – drawn to the sound of gunfire, he joined the fighting contrary to his own military instinct, and would perish leading the defense of the Monteleón artillery barracks.

== Beginning of the uprising ==
On 2 May a crowd began to gather in front of the Royal Palace in Madrid. Those gathered entered the palace grounds in an attempt to prevent the removal of Francisco de Paula. Marshal Murat sent a battalion of grenadiers from the Imperial Guard to the palace along with artillery detachments. The latter opened fire on the assembled crowd, and the rebellion began to spread to other parts of the city.

What followed was street fighting in different areas of Madrid as the poorly armed population confronted the French troops. Marshal Murat had quickly moved the majority of his troops into the city and there was heavy fighting around the Puerta del Sol and the Puerta de Toledo. Murat imposed martial law in the city and assumed full control of the administration. Little by little, the French regained control of the city, and many hundreds of people died in the fighting. The painting by Spanish artist Francisco de Goya, The Charge of the Mamelukes, portrays the street fighting that took place. The Mamelukes of the Imperial Guard fighting residents of Madrid in the Puerta del Sol, wearing turbans and using curved scimitars, provoked memories of Muslim Spain when Arabs had ruled Spain.

There were Spanish troops stationed in the city, but they remained confined to barracks. The only Spanish troops to disobey orders were from the artillery units at the barracks of Monteleón, who joined the uprising. Two officers of these troops, Luis Daoíz y Torres and Pedro Velarde y Santiyán are still commemorated as heroes of the rebellion. Both died during the French assault of the barracks, as the rebels were reduced by vastly superior numbers.

== Impact of the uprising ==
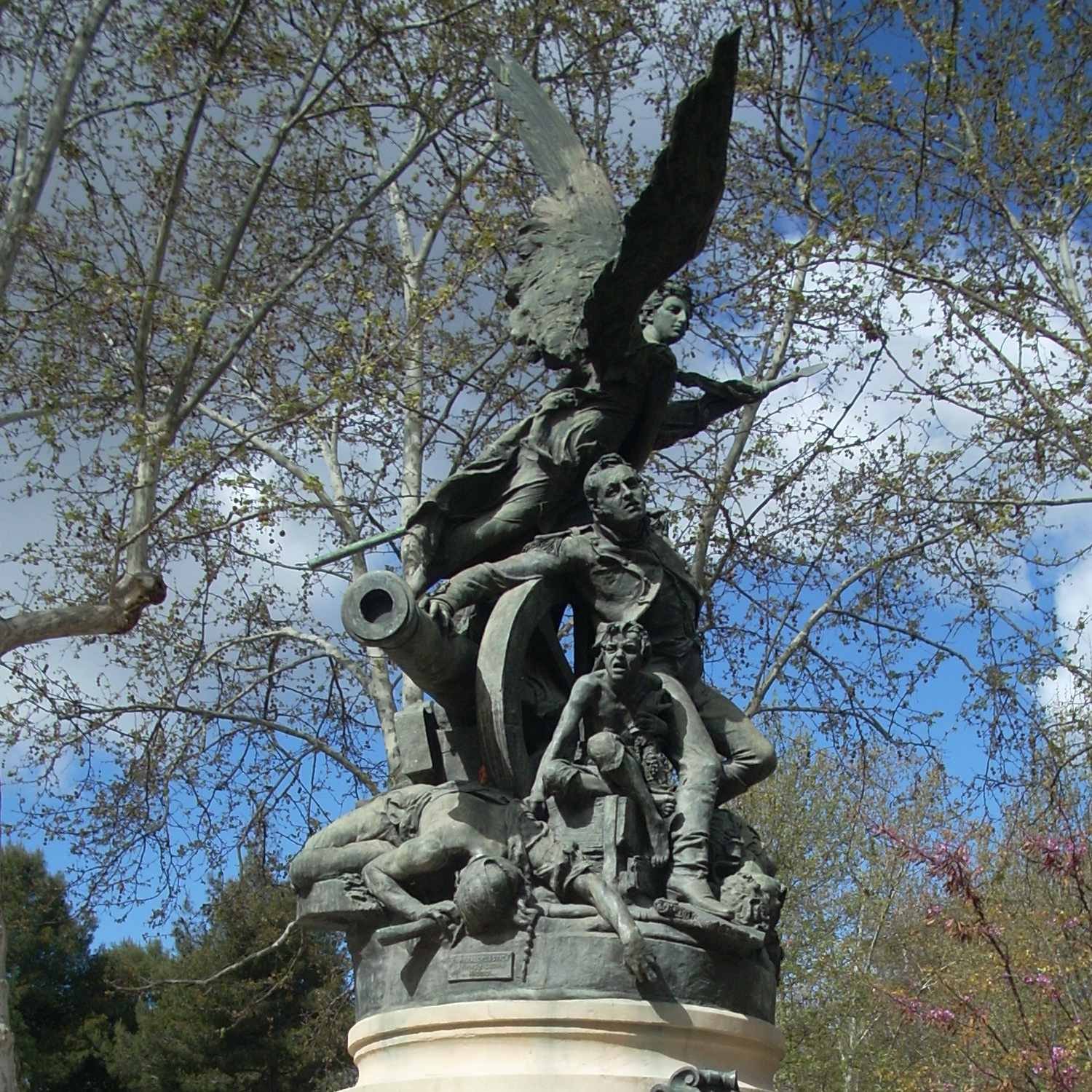
The Heroes of the Second of May memorial, Madrid

The repression following the crushing of the initial rebellion was harsh. Marshal Murat created a military commission on the evening of 2 May to be presided over by General Grouchy. This commission issued death sentences to all of those captured who were bearing weapons of any kind. In a statement issued that day Murat said: "The population of Madrid, led astray, has given itself to revolt and murder. French blood has flowed. It demands vengeance. All those arrested in the uprising, arms in hand, will be shot."

All public meetings were prohibited and an order was issued requiring all weapons to be handed in to the authorities. Hundreds of prisoners were executed the following day, a scene captured in a famous painting by Goya, The Third of May 1808. As the French had been attacked with a variety of improvised weapons, any craftsmen found with shearing scissors, kitchen knives, sewing needles, or other tools of their trade were summarily shot. Only a handful of French-speaking madrileños were able to avoid execution by pleading in words intelligible to their executioners.

That same day, in the nearby town of Móstoles, news of the repression prompted Juan Pérez Villamil, who was secretary of the Admiralty and prosecutor of the Supreme War Council, to encourage the mayors of the town, Andrés Torrejón and Simón Hernández, to sign a declaration of war calling on all Spaniards to rise up against the invaders. The name of this declaration was "Bando de los alcaldes de Móstoles" or "bando de la Independencia", which means "Edict of the Independence."

== Analysis ==
The Dos de Mayo Uprising, together with the subsequent proclamation of Napoleon's brother Joseph as king led to a rebellion against French rule. While the French occupiers hoped that their rapid suppression of the uprising would demonstrate their control of Spain, the rebellion actually gave considerable impetus to the resistance.

The uprising and subsequent revolts leading to the Peninsular War have sometimes been compared to the War in the Vendée, as it shared some similarities in that both were counterrevolutionary uprisings ("the common people's Baroque victory over the Enlightenment", in the words of historian Ronald Fraser). However, the Spanish revolts originated amongst urban populations rather than the rural peasantry and were spread nationally instead of just being concentrated in one region, as well as being aimed to restore a popular king. The revolt also depended upon cross-class appeal, with the labouring classes willing to fight on the insistence that the nobility and clergy likewise enlisted into military service.

== Aftermath ==
The Dos de Mayo Uprising put Iberia in revolt against French rule starting with the Action of Valdepeñas.

The Invasion of Portugal had started with the occupation of Lisbon in 1807. But the Dos de Mayo Uprising started a rebellion in Portugal with the Combat of Padrões de Teixeira.

The British intervention started with the Battle of Roliça led by Wellington.

The Spanish conventional warfare started with the Battles of El Bruch.

Napoleon started his invasion of Spain with the Battle of Zornoza.

== Commemoration ==
The Second of May is now a public holiday in the Community of Madrid. The place where the artillery barracks of Monteleón was located is now a square called the Plaza del Dos de Mayo, and the district surrounding the square is known as Malasaña in memory of one of the heroines of the revolt, the teenager Manuela Malasaña, who was executed by French troops in the aftermath of the revolt.

Several memorials to the heroes of 2 May are located around Madrid, including the Monumento a los Caídos por España (Monument to those who fell to their deaths for Spain).

The name of the Spanish Navy screw frigate Villa de Madrid, in commission from 1863 to 1884, although literally meaning simply "City of Madrid", was chosen with the intention of honoring the role of the people of Madrid in the Dos de Mayo Uprising.

== See also ==
- Timeline of the Peninsular War

Preceded by Invasion of Portugal (1807)	Napoleonic Wars; Dos de Mayo Uprising	Succeeded by Battles of El Bruch
