= Pedro Velarde y Santiyán =

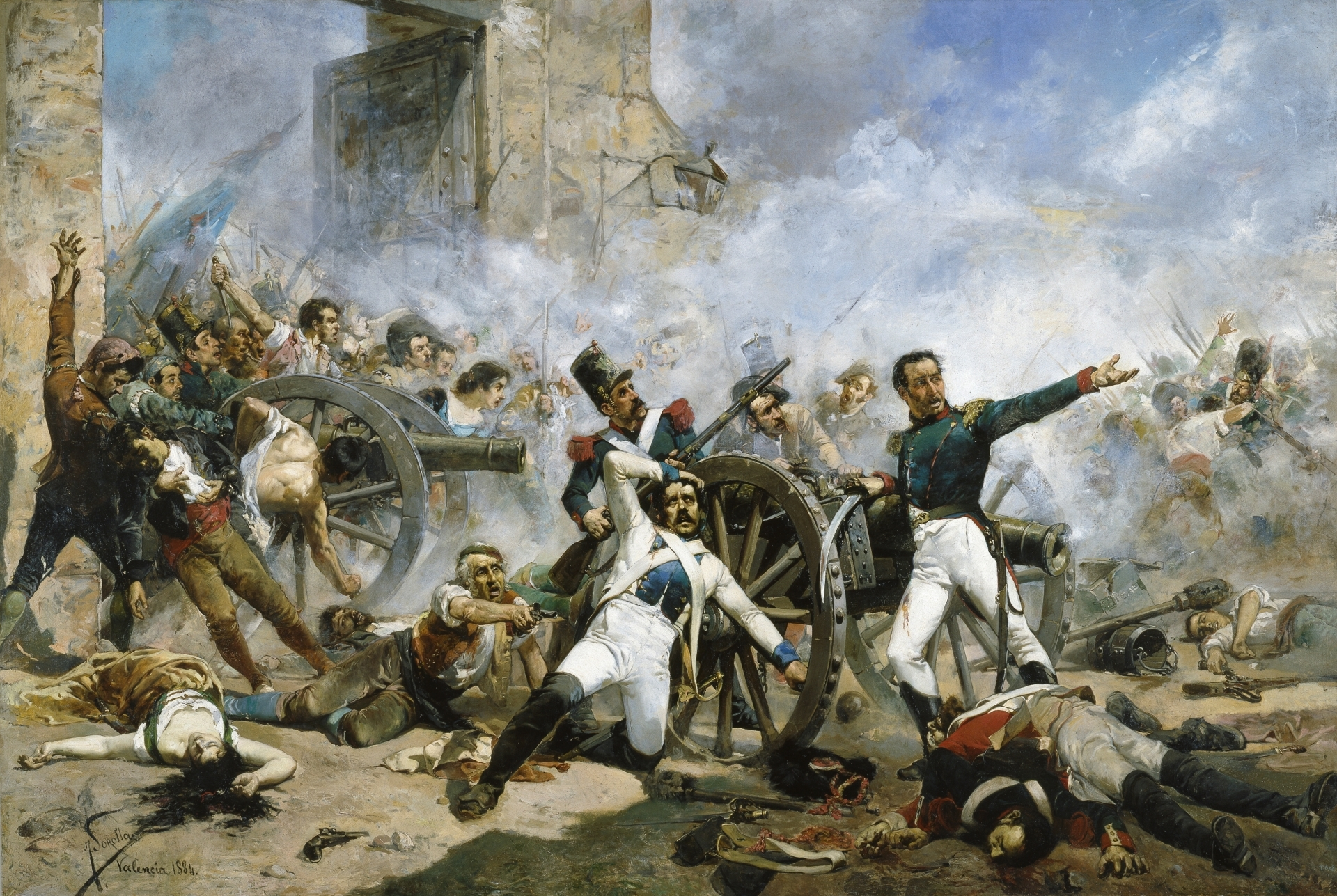
- Defensa del Parque de Artillería de Monteleón, by Joaquín Sorolla depicts Velarde's last stand
- Born: Pedro Velarde y Santiyán; 19 October 1779; Muriedas, Camargo, Spain
- Died: 2 May 1808 (aged 28); Madrid, Spain
- Military career
- Allegiance: Spain
- Branch: Spanish Army
- Service years: 1793–1808
- Rank: Captain
- Conflicts: War of the Oranges; Peninsular War; Dos de Mayo Uprising

Captain Pedro Velarde y Santiyán (19 October 1779 – 2 May 1808) was a Spanish Army officer best known for his participation in the Dos de Mayo Uprising against the French occupation of Madrid. Dying during the uprising, he became a hero and martyr in Spain during and after the Peninsular War.

Born to a Cantabrian family in Muriedas, Camargo, Velarde enrolled in the Artillery College (Colegio de Artillería) at the Alcázar of Segovia in 1793. He graduated near the top of his class and was commissioned into the Spanish army, being promoted to sub-lieutenant in 1799. He fought in the War of the Oranges against Portugal in 1800 and was promoted to lieutenant in 1802 and captain in 1804.

Velarde returned to the Artillery College after the war and worked as an instructor in mathematics and ballistics, in which he became something of an expert. In 1806 he was made a secretary of the Artillery Corps' Junta Superior Económica and established himself in Madrid. When the Dos de Mayo Uprising against France's occupation of Madrid erupted on 2 May 1808, Velarde took up arms and rallied his men. Acting on orders from the local junta, Velarde and fellow captain Luis Daoíz y Torres led 20 Spanish soldiers and approximately 80 civilian volunteers, including women, to defend the Monteleón artillery barracks against a force of 2,000 French troops. Velarde, and most of his soldiers, were killed in the fighting.

His body was recovered from the battlefield and carried off to a burial. Velarde's epic last stand, immortalized in artwork and monuments, assured him a central place in the pantheon of heroes from the national resistance to Napoleon that has since formed part of Spain's national mythology. The name of one of the two lions standing at the Congreso de los Diputados is Velarde. The other lion's name is Daoiz.
