= Acacias (Madrid Metro) =

Madrid Metro station

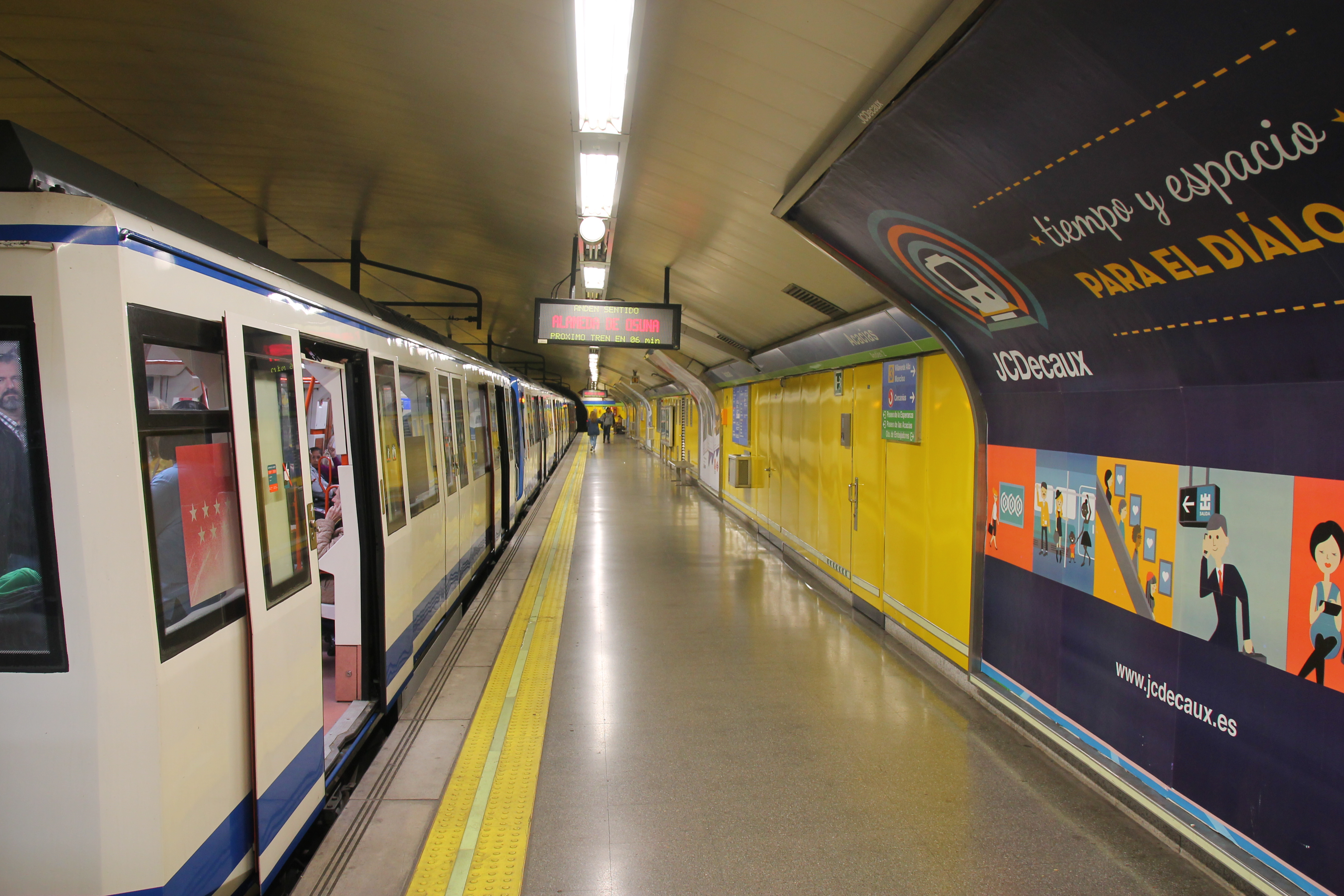

General information
- Location: Arganzuela, Madrid; Spain
- System: Madrid Metro station
- Owner: CRTM
- Operator: CRTM

Construction
- Structure type: Underground
- Accessible: No

Other information
- Fare zone: A

History
- Opened: 5 June 1968; 58 years ago

Services
Preceding station	Madrid Metro	Following station
Puerta de Toledo towards Alameda de Osuna	Line 5	Pirámides towards Casa de Campo
Location
- Location within Madrid

Acacias is a station on line 5 of the Madrid Metro. It's named after Paseo de las Acacias, "Acacias Walk"). It is located in fare Zone A. The station offers connection to the Embajadores metro station and Cercanías station.

== History ==
On 5 June 1968 the first section of line 5 was opened between Carabanchel and Callao, including Acacias station, which was joined to Embajadores station by means of a corridor to allow a transfer with line 3 and the Cercanías line C-5.
