= La Latina (Madrid Metro) =

Madrid Metro station

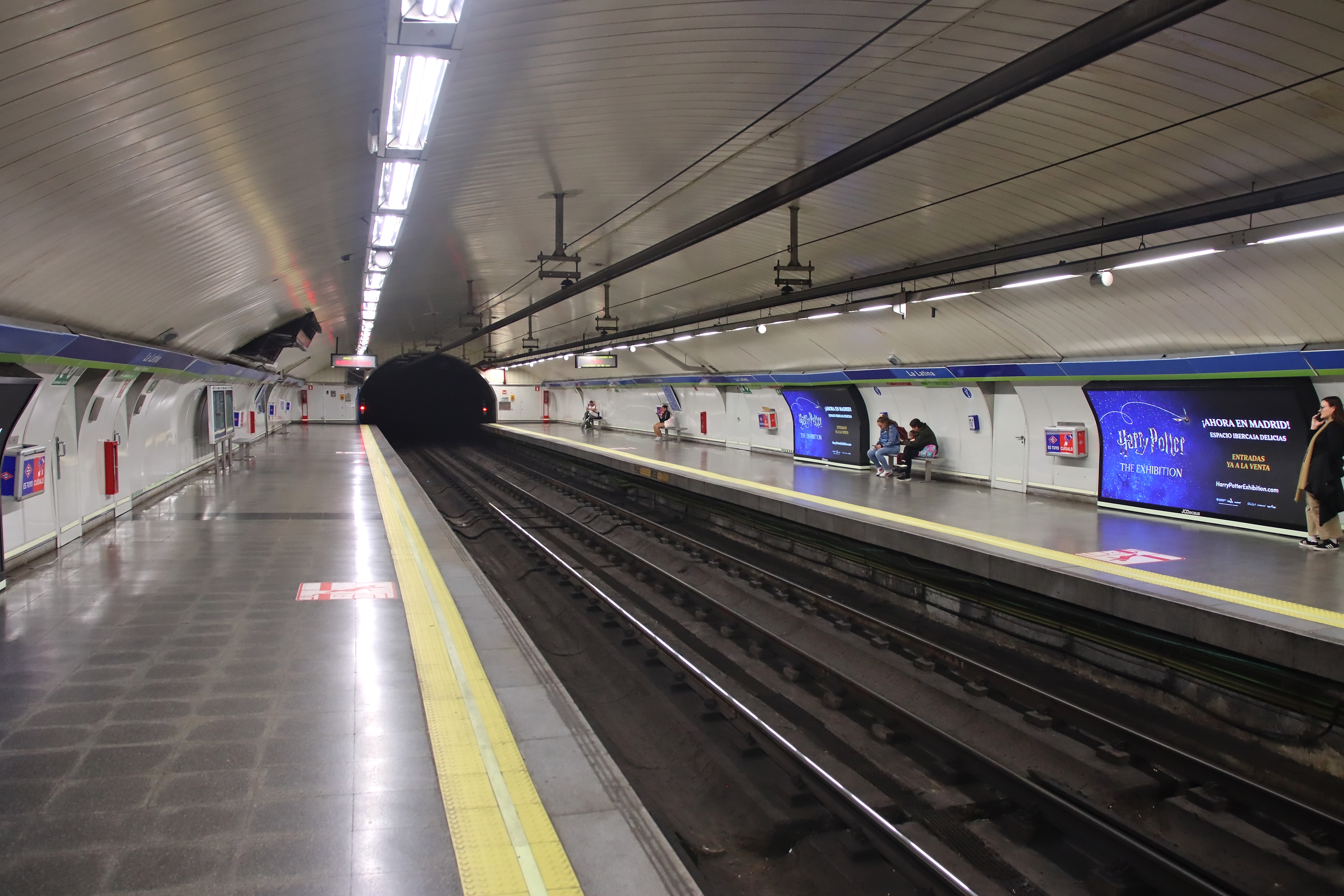

General information
- Location: Centro, Madrid; Spain
- Coordinates: 40.411279°N 3.7081611°W
- System: Madrid Metro station
- Owner: CRTM
- Operator: CRTM

Construction
- Accessible: No

Other information
- Fare zone: A

History
- Opened: 5 June 1968

Services
| Preceding station | Madrid Metro | Following station |
|---|---|---|
| Ópera towards Alameda de Osuna | Line 5 | Puerta de Toledo towards Casa de Campo |
Location
- Location within Madrid

La Latina [la laˈtina] is a station of Line 5 of the Madrid Metro. It is located in the Barrio de La Latina, part of the district Centro, in fare Zone A.

== Overview ==
Located near Plaza de la Cebada, a central square of Madrid, La Latina was opened the 6 June 1968, when the Line 5 was inaugurated from Callao to Carabanchel.

It is an underground station at 28 m below ground with 2 tracks and 2 platforms. It counts 3 entrances: San Francisco (Calle de Toledo, 56), San Millán (C. Toledo, 65) and Toledo (C. Toledo, 62).
