= Marqués de Vadillo (Madrid Metro) =

Madrid Metro station

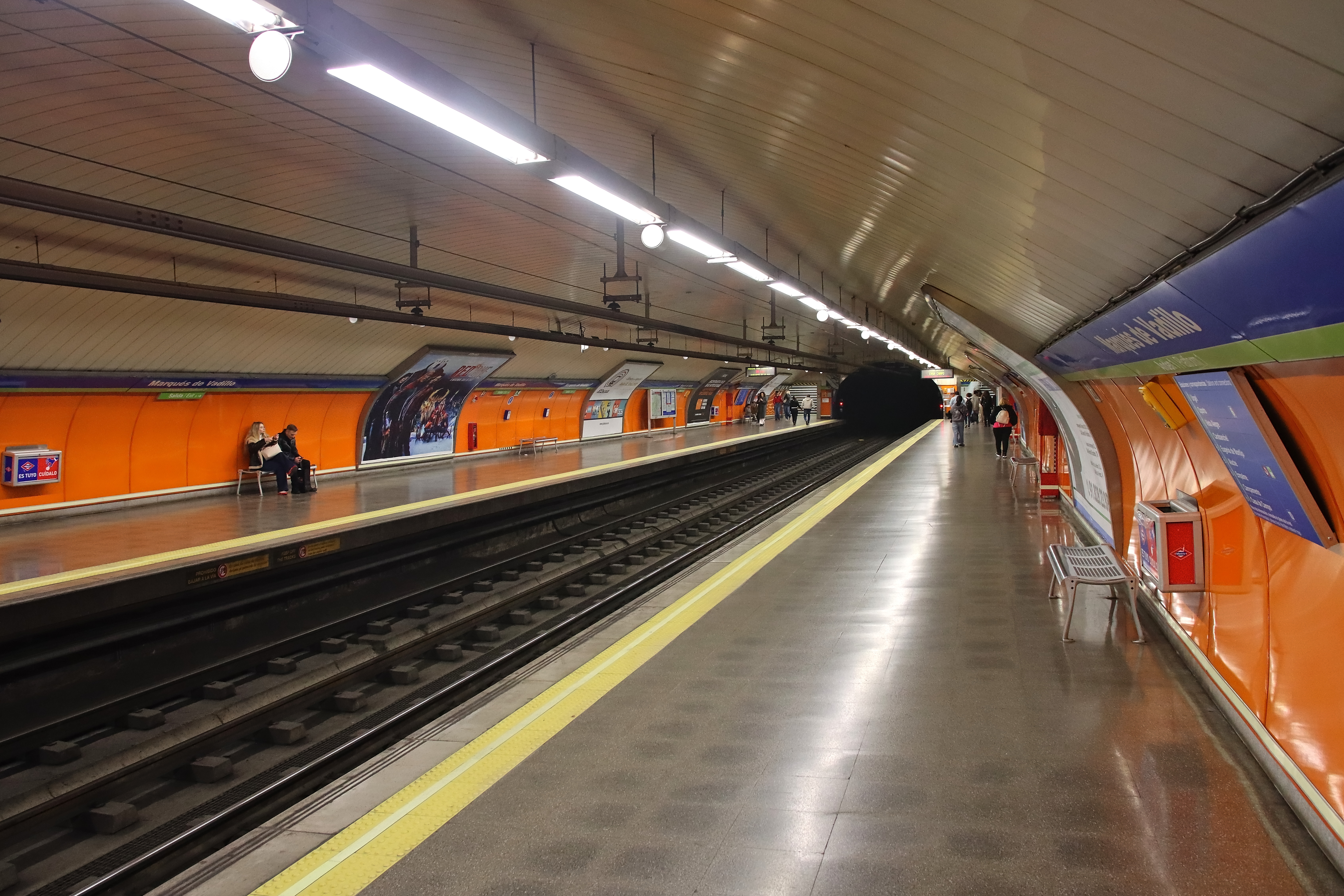

General information
- Location: Carabanchel, Madrid; Spain
- Coordinates: 40.3973571°N 3.7159575°W
- System: Madrid Metro station
- Owner: CRTM
- Operator: CRTM

Construction
- Accessible: No

Other information
- Fare zone: A

History
- Opened: 5 June 1968

Services
Preceding station	Madrid Metro	Following station
Pirámides towards Alameda de Osuna	Line 5	Urgel towards Casa de Campo
Location
- Location within Madrid

Marqués de Vadillo [maɾˈkes ðe βaˈðiʎo] is a station on Line 5 of the Madrid Metro, located under the Glorieta Marqués de Vadillo ("Marquess of Vadillo Roundabout"). It is located in fare Zone A.
