= Vicente Calderón Stadium =

Former stadium in Madrid, Spain

Estadio Vicente Calderón
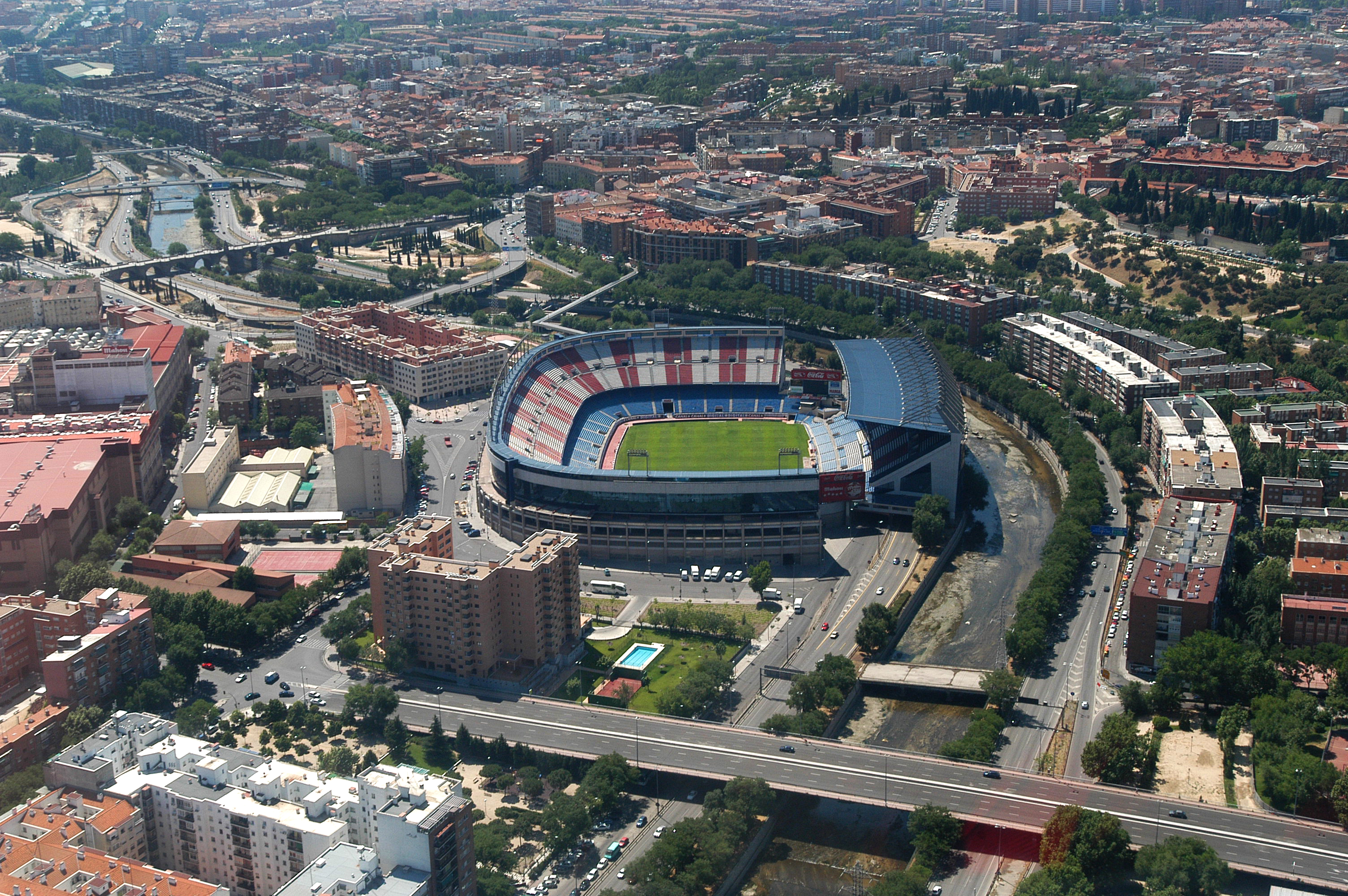
- UEFA
- Interactive map of Estadio Vicente Calderón
- Full name: Estadio Vicente Calderón
- Former names: Estadio Manzanares (1966–71)
- Location: Arganzuela, Madrid, Spain
- Coordinates: 40°24′6.19″N 3°43′14.18″W
- Capacity: 54,907
- Field size: 105 m × 70 m (115 yd × 77 yd)

Construction
- Groundbreaking: 3 August 1959; 67 years ago
- Opened: 2 October 1966; 60 years ago
- Renovated: 1972, 1982
- Closed: 28 May 2017; 9 years ago
- Demolished: 13 February 2019–6 July 2020
- Architects: Javier Barroso; Miguel Ángel García Lomas

Tenant
- Atlético Madrid (1966–2017)

The Vicente Calderón Stadium (Spanish: Estadio Vicente Calderón [esˈtaðjo βiˈθente kaldeˈɾon]) was the home stadium of Atlético Madrid from its completion in 1966 to 2017, with a seating capacity of 54,907. It was located on the banks of the Manzanares, in the Arganzuela district of Madrid, Spain.

The stadium was originally called the Estadio Manzanares, but this was later changed to the Vicente Calderón Stadium, in honour of their long-term President Vicente Calderón. The stadium closed in 2017 after the conclusion of the 2016–17 season, with Atlético Madrid moving to Metropolitano Stadium for the following season. Demolition began in 2019 and completed the following year.

The original capacity from 1966 was 62,000 people. For the 1982 World Cup it was decided to add another 4000 seats, so the capacity from 1982 to 2001 was 66,000. After 2001 downsizing of the stadium started in small steps until its closing in 2017, when it stood with just below 55,000 seats.

A notable, and rather spectacular feature of the Vicente Calderón, was that the M-30 dual carriageway, running from the South Node Toledo Bridge, passed below one of the main stands.

== History ==
Construction of a new stadium to replace El Metropolitano originally began in 1959, but came to a halt following financial problems. The ground eventually opened in 1966 as the Estadio del Manzanares, being renamed Vicente Calderón in 1972. The Stadium had a capacity of 62 000 people seated when opened in 1966. For the World Cup there was called for even more people in the Stadium, so by 1982 the capacity was 66 000 people. The 66 000 capacity was kept until 2001 when downsizing started in small steps at a time.

=== Departure of Atlético ===
The final match at the stadium was on 28 May 2017, between a past and present Atlético side and a world XI.

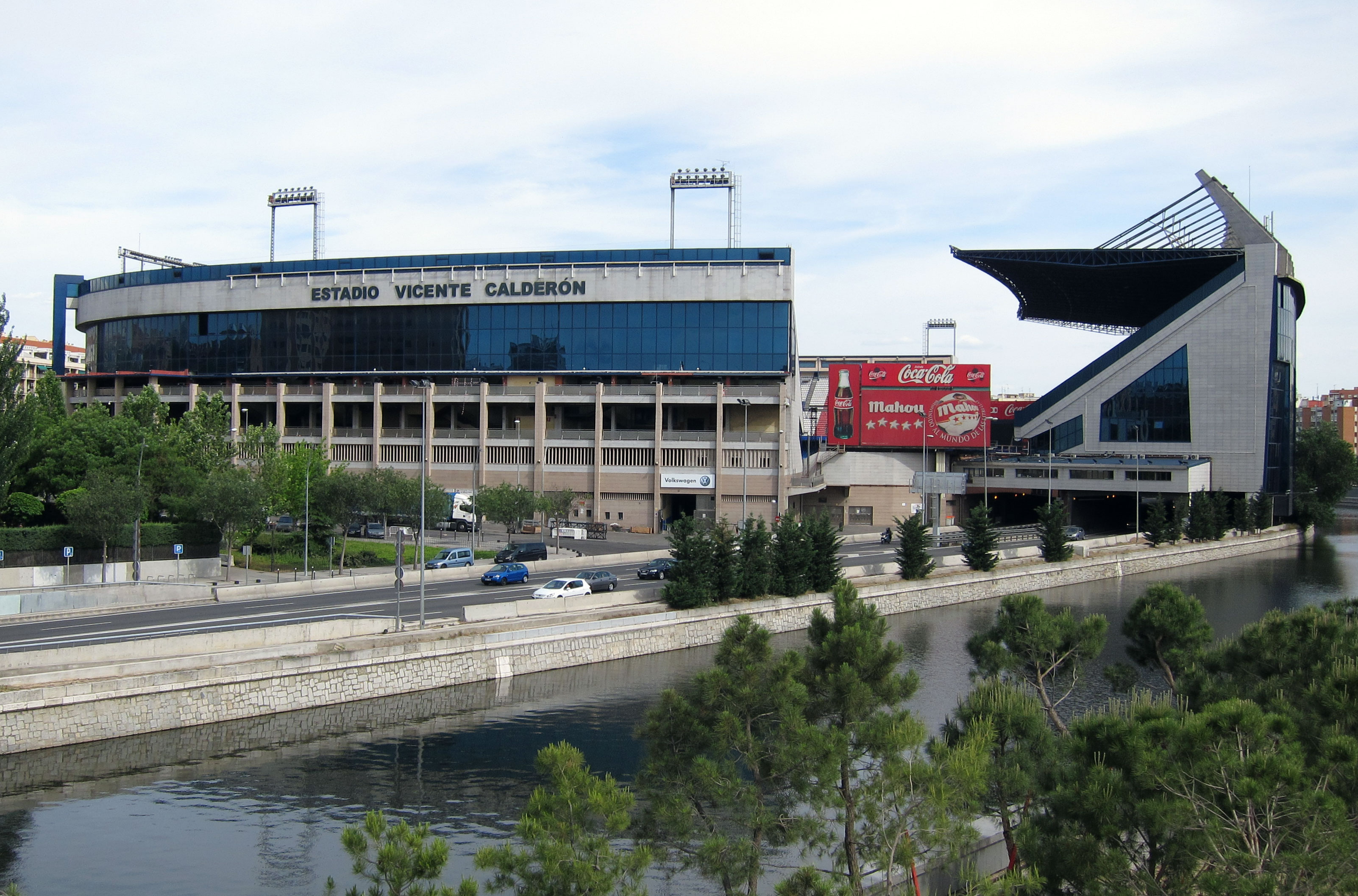
North external view of the stadium.

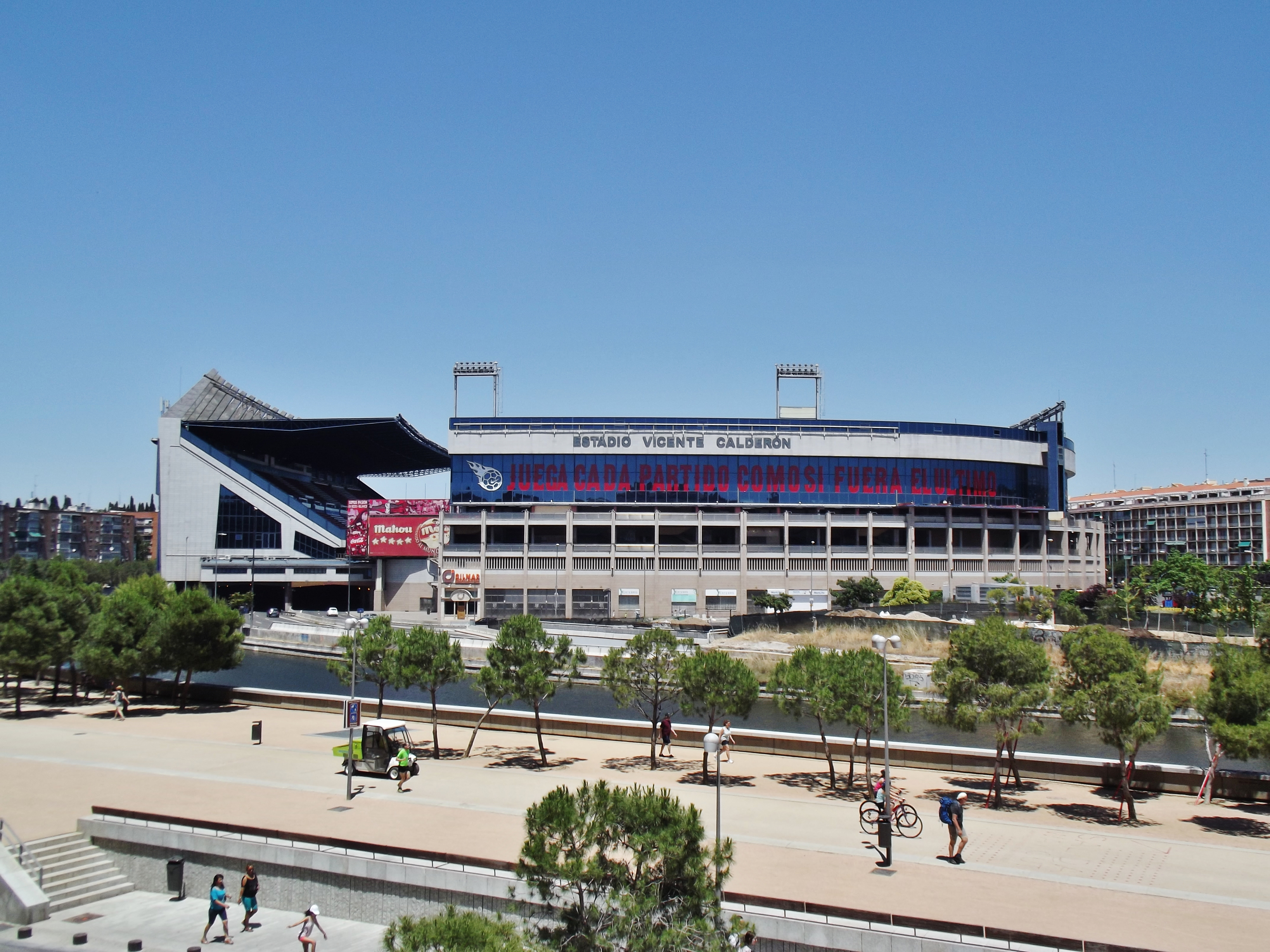
South external view of the stadium.

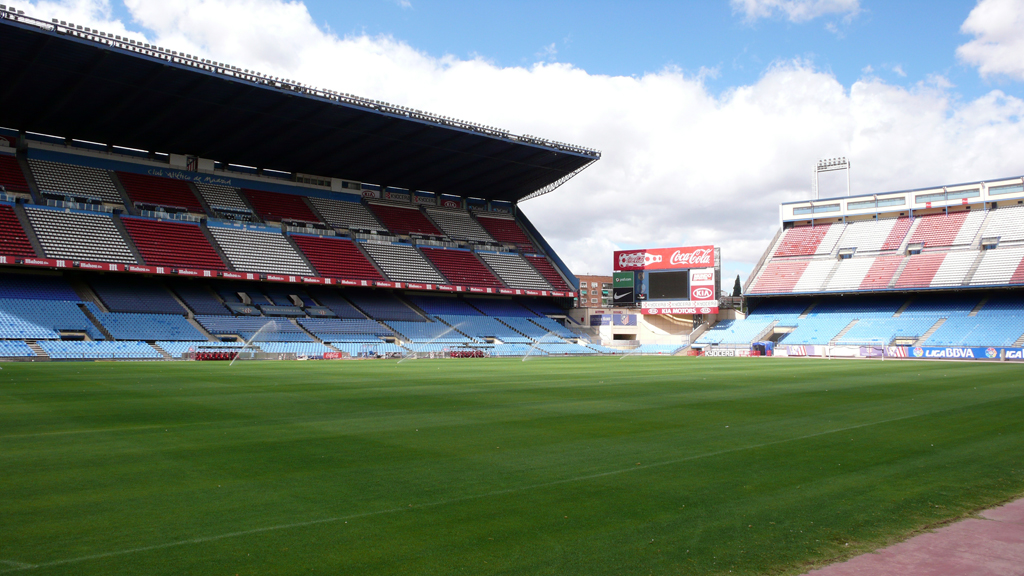
Northwest internal view of the stadium.

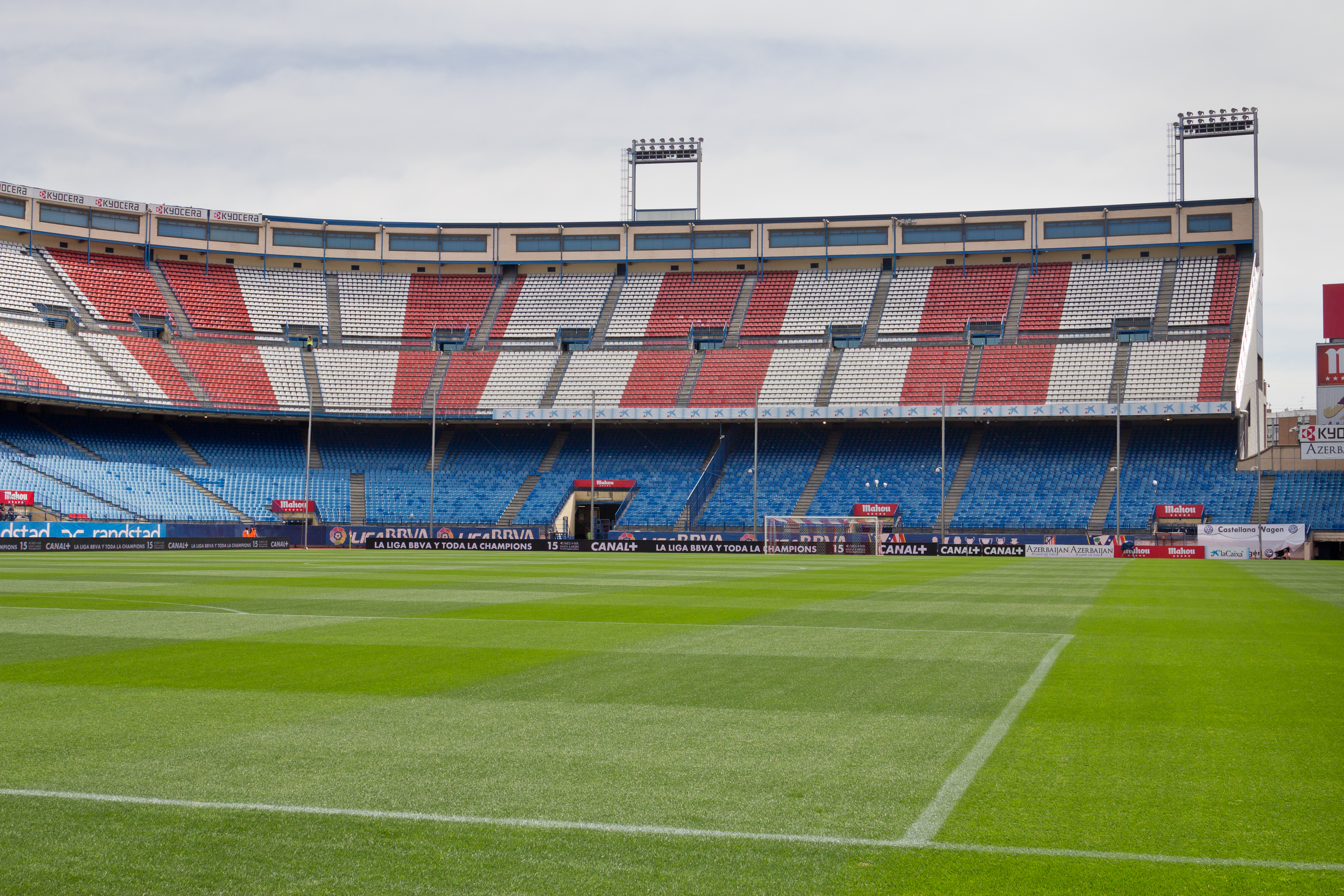
South end stand view of the stadium.

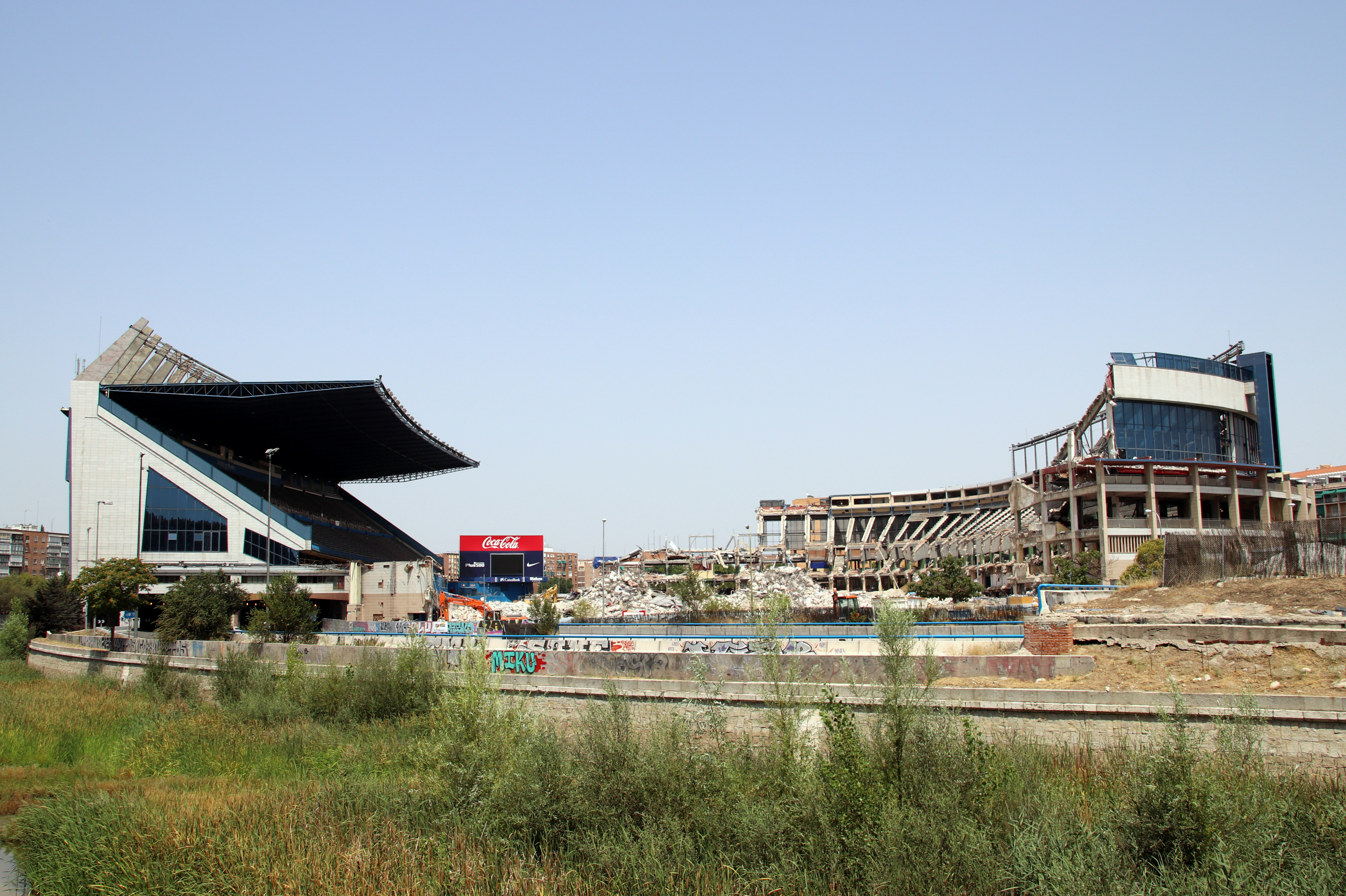
Demolition of the stadium (July 2019)

Both Bruce Springsteen and The Rolling Stones played here in 1988 and 1982. Bruce Springsteen had an attendance of 70 000 People on August 2, 1988. The Rolling Stones had attendance of 68 000 people. The Springsteen concert and the Springsteen Concert in Camp Nou in front of 95 000 people were the fastest selling tickets ever in the history of Spain. On 23 September 1992 Michael Jackson held a sold-out concert as part of his Dangerous World Tour to 54,907 people. Mexican pop group RBD recorded their Hecho en España DVD on 22 June 2007 during their Tour Celestial at the stadium. This tour spawned eight concerts throughout Spain.

== Location ==
The Estadio Vicente Calderón was located on the banks of the Manzanares river. The closest metro station to the grounds was Pirámides, located on Line 5.

== Copa del Rey finals ==
The stadium hosted the final of the Copa del Rey (also previously known as the Copa del Generalísimo) on 14 occasions: 1973, 1974, 1975, 1977, 1979, 1981, 1986, 1989, 1994, 2005, 2008, 2012, 2016, and 2017.

== 1982 FIFA World Cup ==
The stadium hosted three games in the 1982 FIFA World Cup:

Date	Team #1	Res.	Team #2	Round
28 June 1982	Austria	0–1	France	Group D (second round)
1 July 1982	Austria	2–2	Northern Ireland	Group D (second round)
4 July 1982	Northern Ireland	1–4	France	Group D (second round)

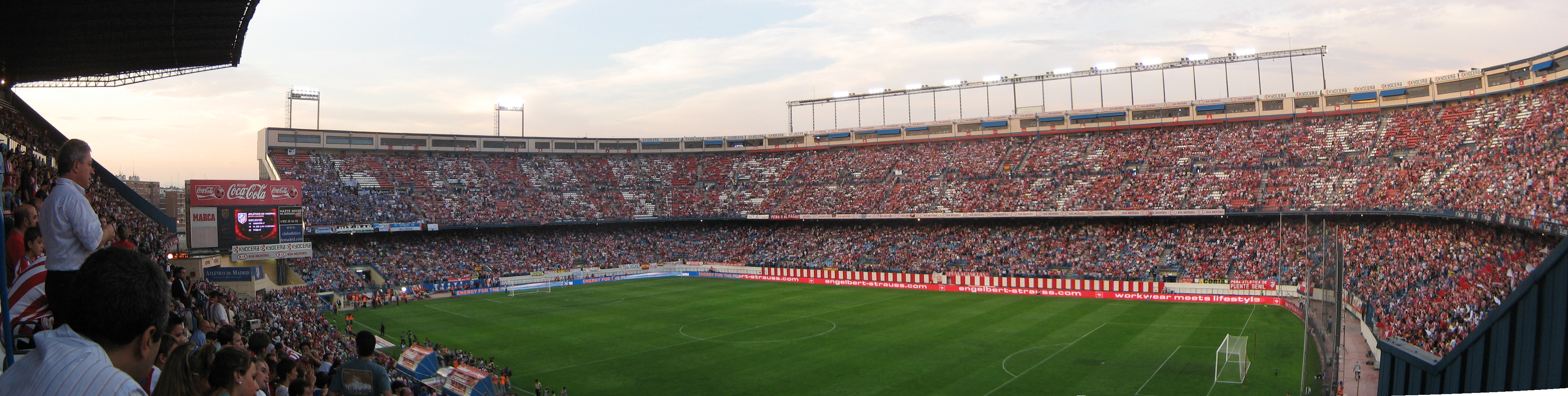
Panoramic view of the stadium
