= Barrio de La Latina (Madrid) =

Neighbourhood in the district of Palacio in the centre of Madrid, Spain

Coordinates: 40°24′52″N 3°42′36″W

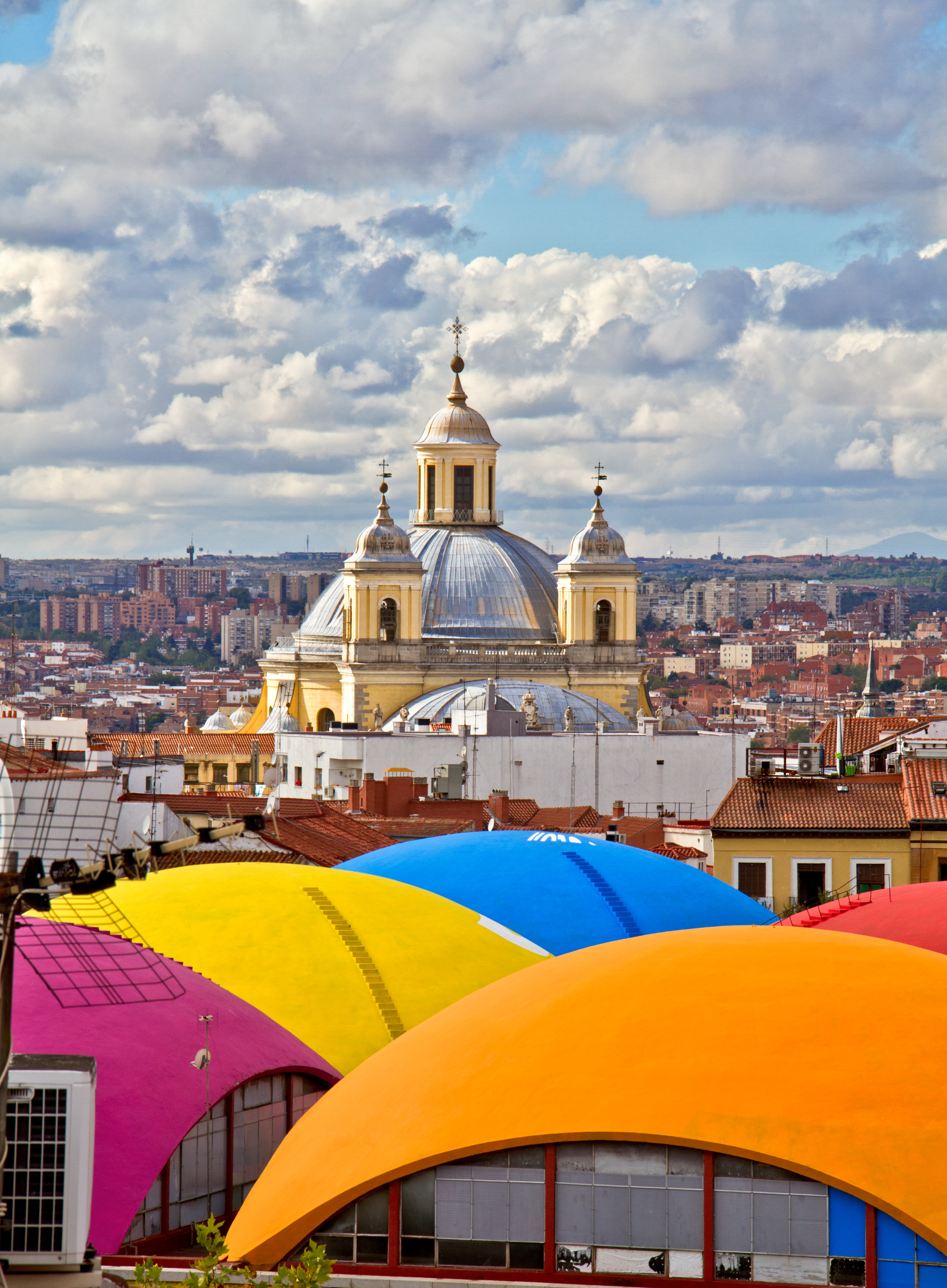
Skyline of La Latina

La Latina is a historic neighborhood in the Centro district of downtown Madrid, Spain. La Latina occupies the place of the oldest area in Madrid, the Islamic citadel inside the city walls, with narrow streets and large squares. It is administratively locked almost entirely within the district of Palacio in Centro. It was named after the old hospital, founded in 1499 by Beatriz Galindo "La Latina". It occupies a large part of what is known as El Madrid de los Austrias, and although its boundaries are subjective, it could be argued that it was essentially the vicinity of the carrera de San Francisco street - that continues from the Plaza de la Cebada up to the San Francisco el Grande Basilica. These limits are: to the north, Segovia street - a deep ravine formerly occupied by the San Pedro Stream which empties into the Manzanares River, to the south there is la Ronda and Puerta de Toledo, on the east there is Toledo street - bordering Rastro and the district of Lavapiés - and to the west, Bailen street.

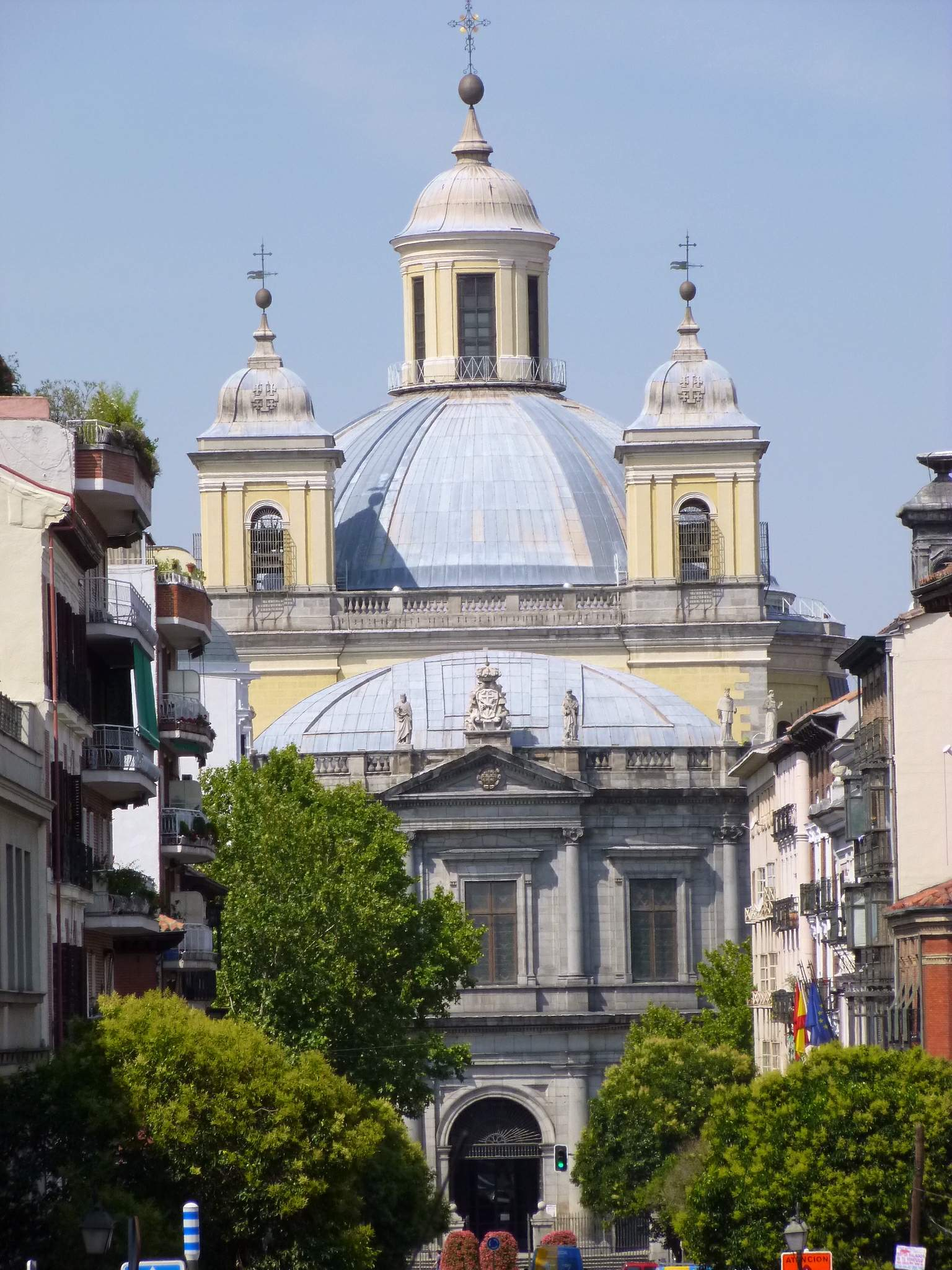
Main façade of the San Francisco el Grande Basilica, Madrid, seen from the Carrera de San Francisco.

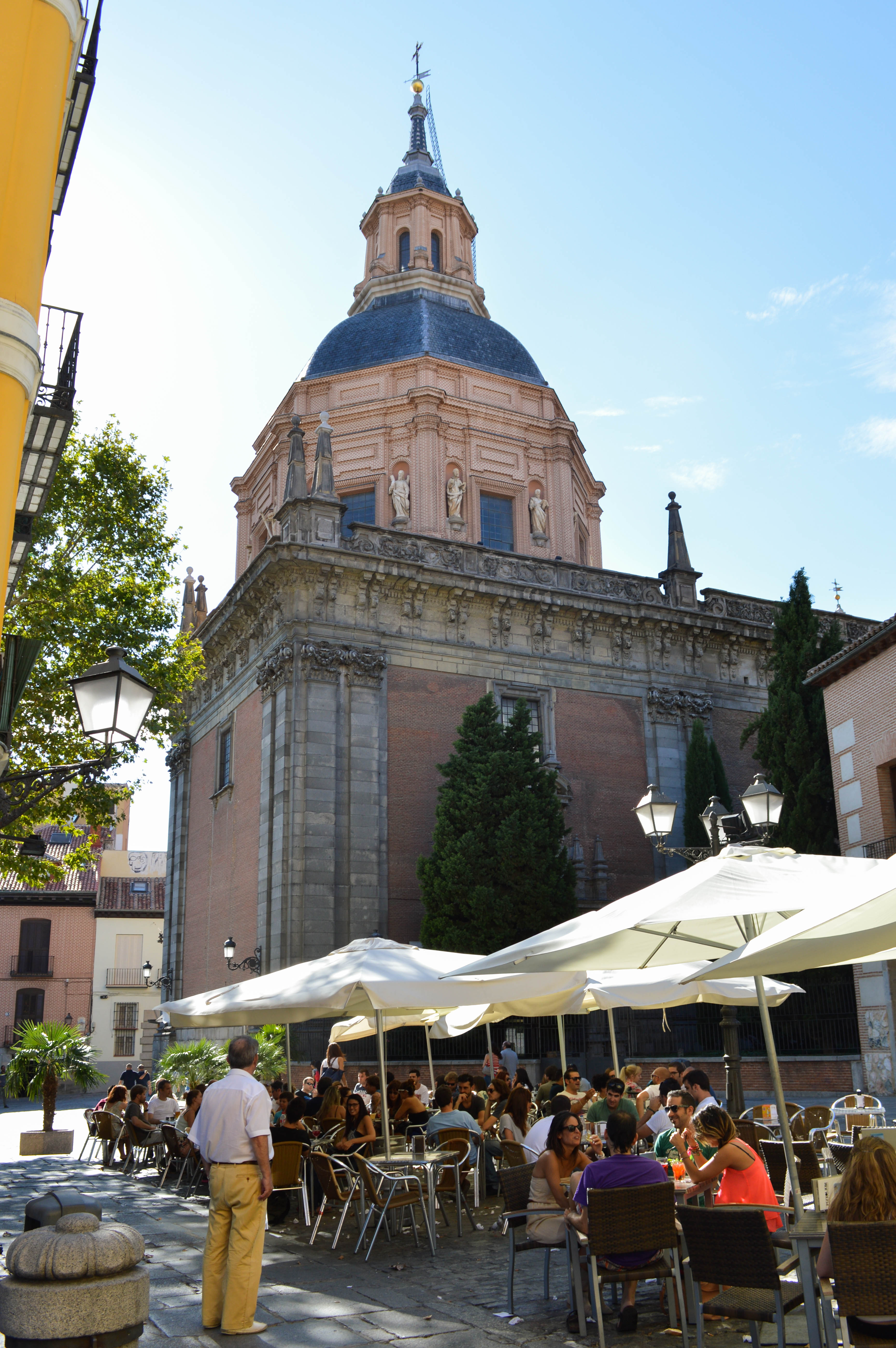
San Andrés church

== History ==
La Latina occupies much of the oldest section of Madrid, sometimes referred to as El Madrid de los Austrias which maintains a peculiar urban layout similar to the medieval distribution, with spacious squares and narrow streets that follow the former course of creeks. As such, the effect is often that of a traditional pueblo rather than the heart of a major city. Its configuration overlaps almost perfectly with the first walled enclosures of the ninth-century fortress, Almudena - and that of the city - Medina - that surrounded it. Its streets have felt the presence of all historical events that took place in Madrid in all periods, without losing its popular character. In this sense it can be said that La Latina constitutes a large part of the true historic center of Madrid.

Despite the remarkable survival of some ancient buildings - among which are some of the best examples of so-called "casas a la malicia" (malice houses) - the construction of the neighborhood is mostly nineteenth century on ancient plots of collapsed or downed buildings which maintain the urbanism of narrow and broken streets with large plazas. There are very typical buildings with large and numerous windows that sometimes constitute narrow wrought iron balconies, slightly protruding eaves with Arabic tiled roofing and coloured mortar façade. They consist of four or five floors, further divided into flats according to the increase in height, generally devoting the entire first floor to residence for the owner and the rest to rentals.

Similar to the rest of Madrid, the integration of new buildings is present, sometimes breaking the cityscape with their ten stories and exposed brick.

Particularly characteristic of this movement was the demolition of the old la Cebada market, opened in 1875 to replace and institutionalize open-air sale in La Plaza de la Cebada and to satisfy the new modernist taste. Health problems, lack of historical consciousness and mid-twentieth century aesthetics led to the demolition of the original market. A mid-twentieth century concrete structure boasting a great vaulted ceiling replaced it. There are currently unfunded plans for a modern market with roof-top public space to replace it. Currently the city's draft amendment of the la Cebada market and attached sports facilities, has been stalled due to financial problems facing the town hall.

The Plaza de la Cebada has functioned as a food market, usually wholesale, since the fifteenth century, occupying a large space outside the walls of the Puerta de Moros enabled for this purpose. City fairs were held there in the eighteenth century, and in the nineteenth century it bore witness to the executions of General Rafael de Riego, who was hanged, and the bandit, Luis Candelas, by garrotte. There is currently a local, community-based movement to revive the space as has occurred in other Madrid markets.

There is a historical explanation for the two Caves (Lower and Upper), currently two streets that run almost parallel filled with shops and entertainment venues. These originally marked the access holes dug under the wall that allowed access in and out of the citadel even with the doors closed. In the seventeenth century, merchants coming from different areas around Madrid to sell in the market stayed in inns, taverns and hostelries on these streets. Travellers and their horses stayed in facilities governed by their countrymen. These facilities grew in quality and services creating a leisure shopping framework tailored to these visitors with fresh money and little social control. Only some of these lodges and the entire orientation to leisure dining and tavern activities, among which include the Casa Lucio, La Soleá and many other traditional establishments in Madrid of maximum relevance of its kind, are still preserved.

== Overview ==
In and around this area are the origins of Madrid. Its difficult to put precise boundaries on La Latina, because, like its immediate neighbors, streets are narrow and winding. There are quite a few nightlife spots, though the neighborhood is best known as having one of the best concentrations of tapas bars (particularly on the Cava Baja and Cava Alta). These tapas bars are most easily accessed by heading north-northeast from the Metro down Calle De Toledo, taking a left (west) on Calle de la Colegiata, and then making a second left, effectively doubling back slightly upon arrival. There are also a number of attractive churches, like the Iglesia de San Andres and the Iglesia de San Francisco el Grande.

On Sundays and major holidays, the Rastro flea market begins on the eastern edge of La Latina, spilling out of the San Millan exit of the La Latina metro stop to the Plaza de Cascorro all the way to the Ronda de Toledo to the south. Plaza de la Paja is another interesting and entertaining spot of this neighborhood.

On the other side, La Latina borders with Plaza Mayor and overlaps with the ancient part of the town, El Madrid de los Austrias, where the Palacio Real (Royal Palace) is located.

La Latina has developed a gay area centered on Calle Calatrava, with many bars and some restaurants/tapas bars that cater to the community. The popular La Paloma festival in August is also very popular among the gay community and takes place along Calatrava and surrounding streets.

== Transportation ==
La Latina is served by Metro Line 5 (Green) at two stops: La Latina and Puerta de Toledo as well as many buses. Because of its semi-pedestrian character, the price of metered parking, shortage of places to park, which is a difficult endeavour, especially on evenings and weekend nights and Sunday mornings, and the intensity of traffic at all hours - even at dawn on the days mentioned - public transportation and walking are recommended.

== Gallery ==
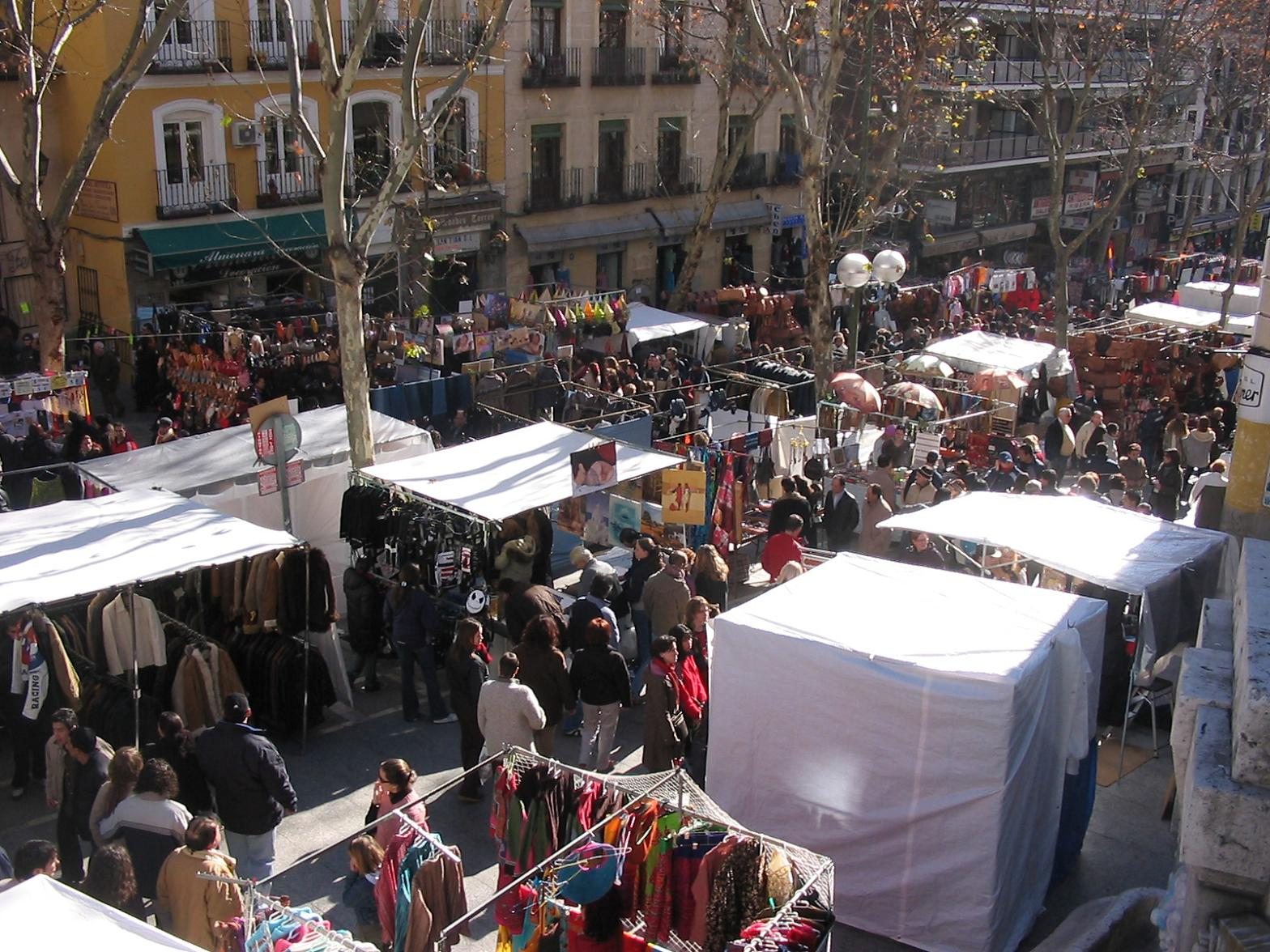
Ribera de Curtidores, the main street of el Rastro flea market.

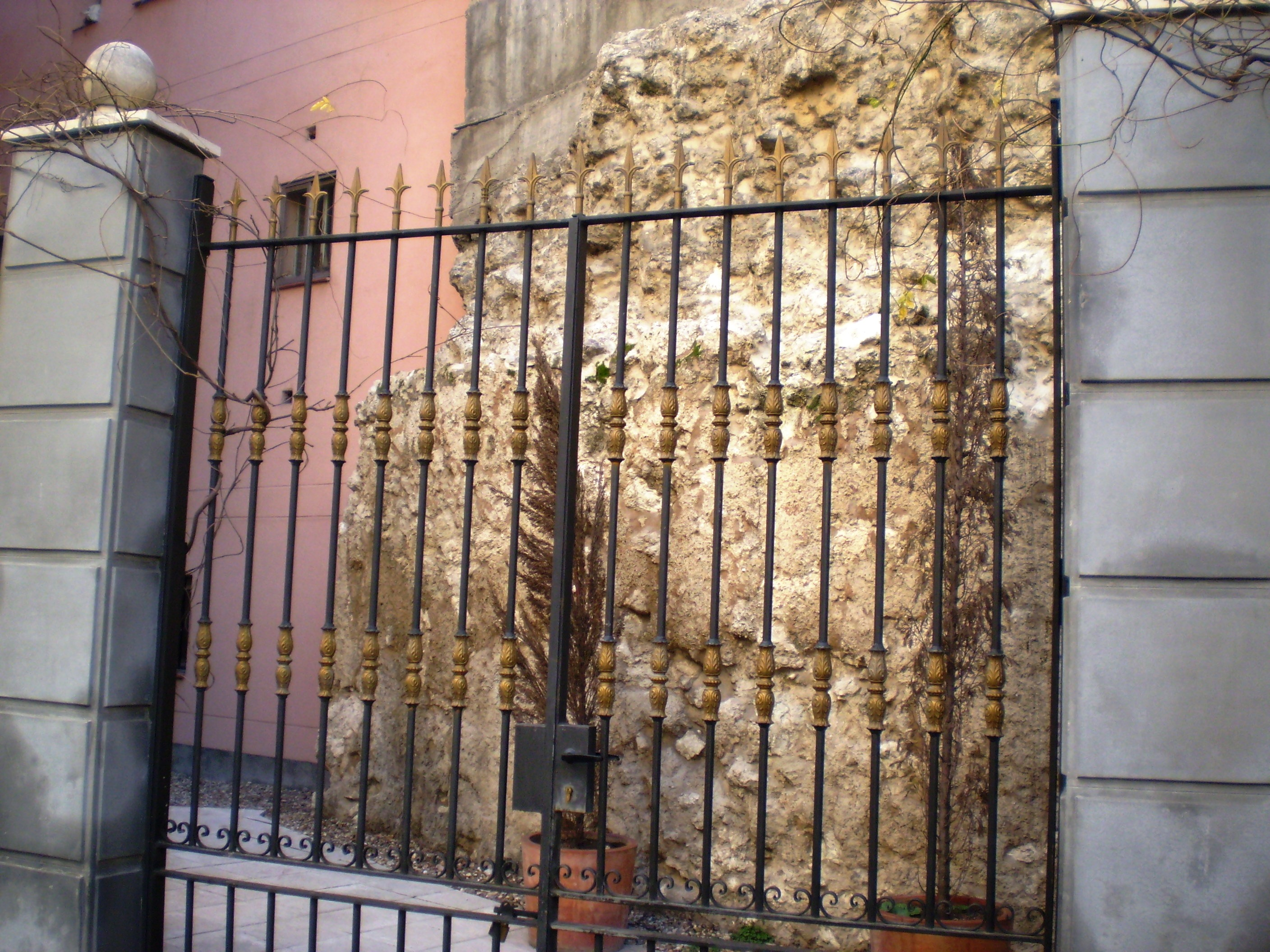
Remains of the Christian wall of Madrid on Mancebos Street.

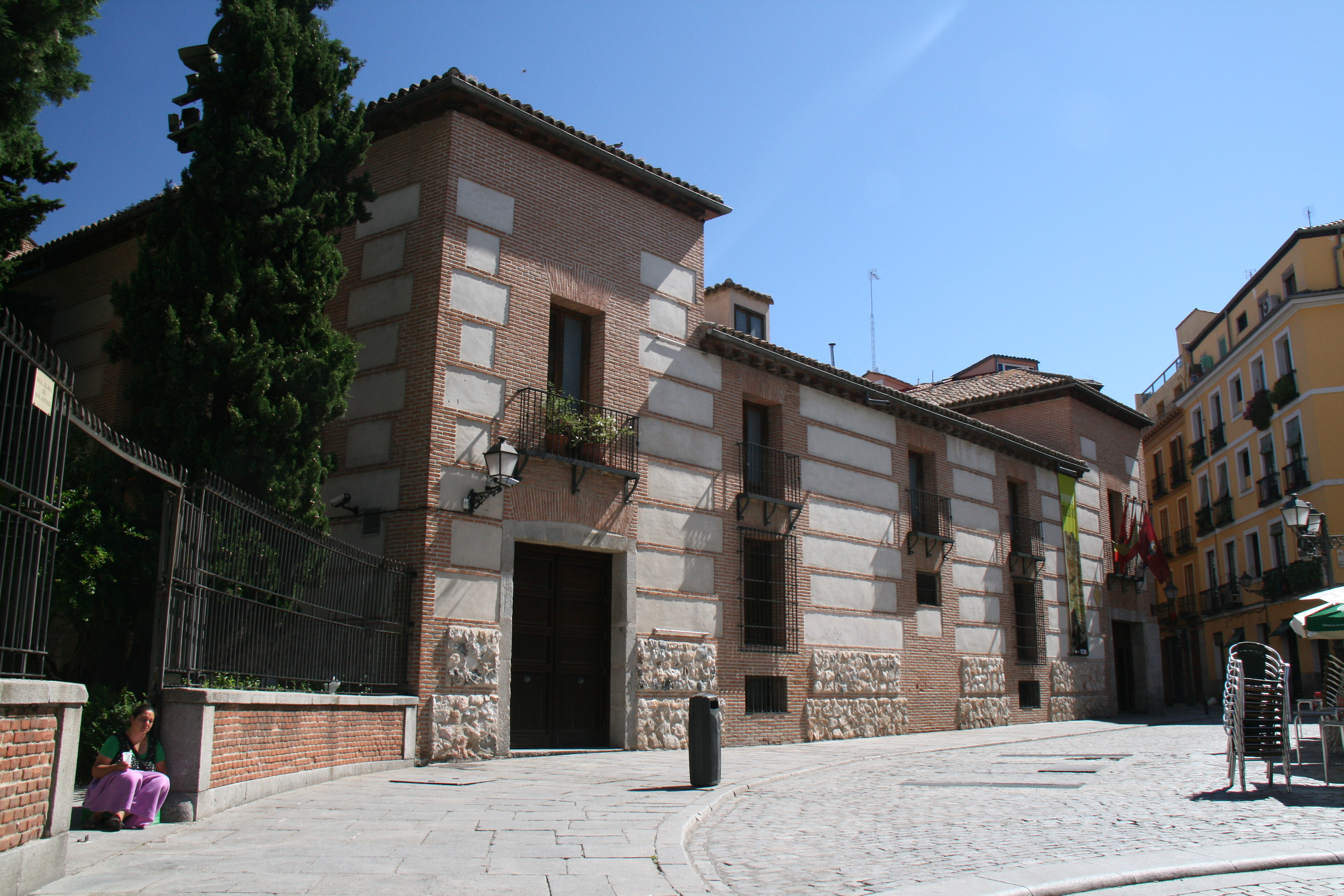
San Isidro House Museum or Museum of origins in San Andrés Square

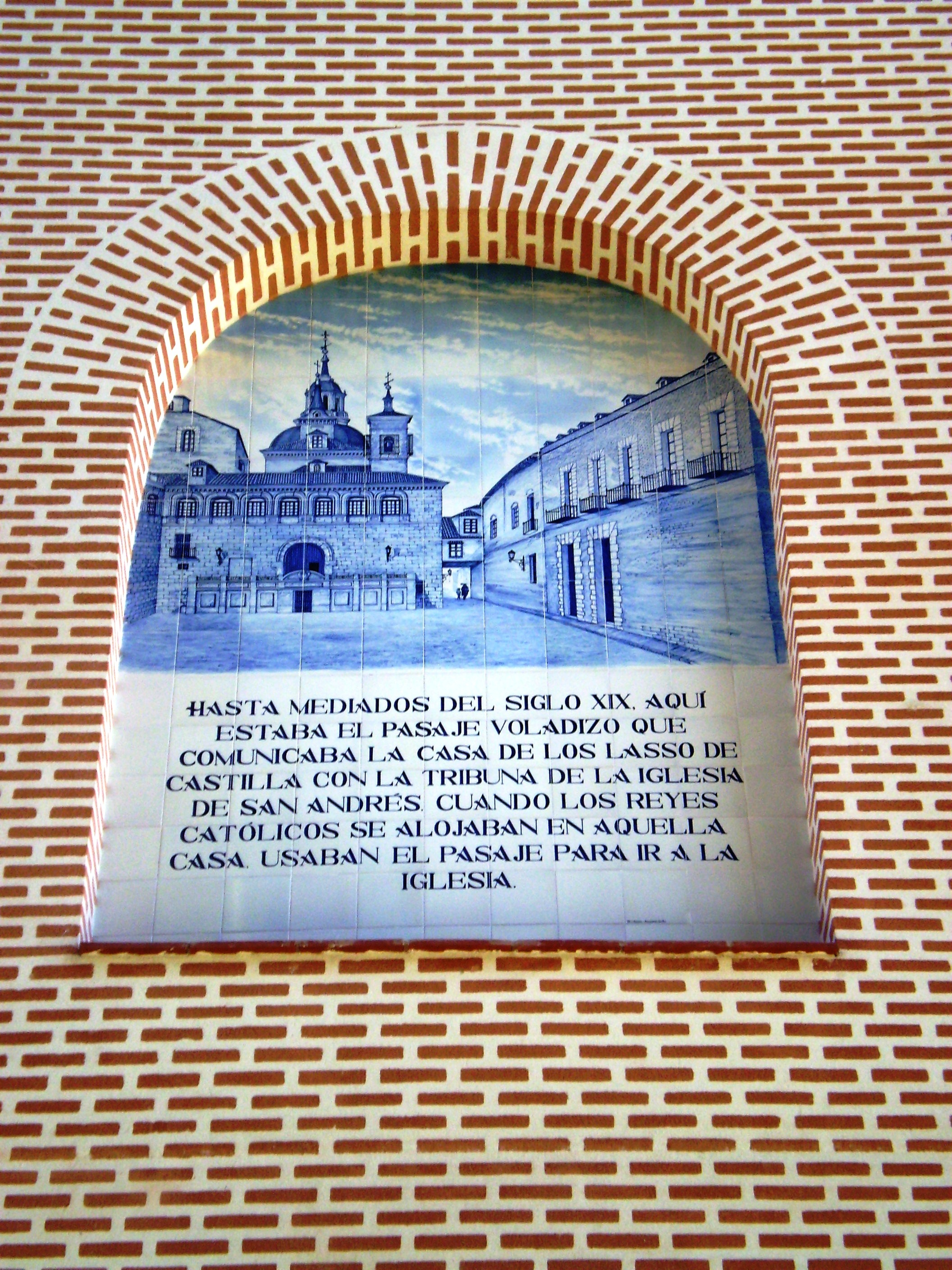
Arch in the San Andrés Church (Madrid), which faces the passage connecting the Palacio de los Lasso of Vega with the temple.

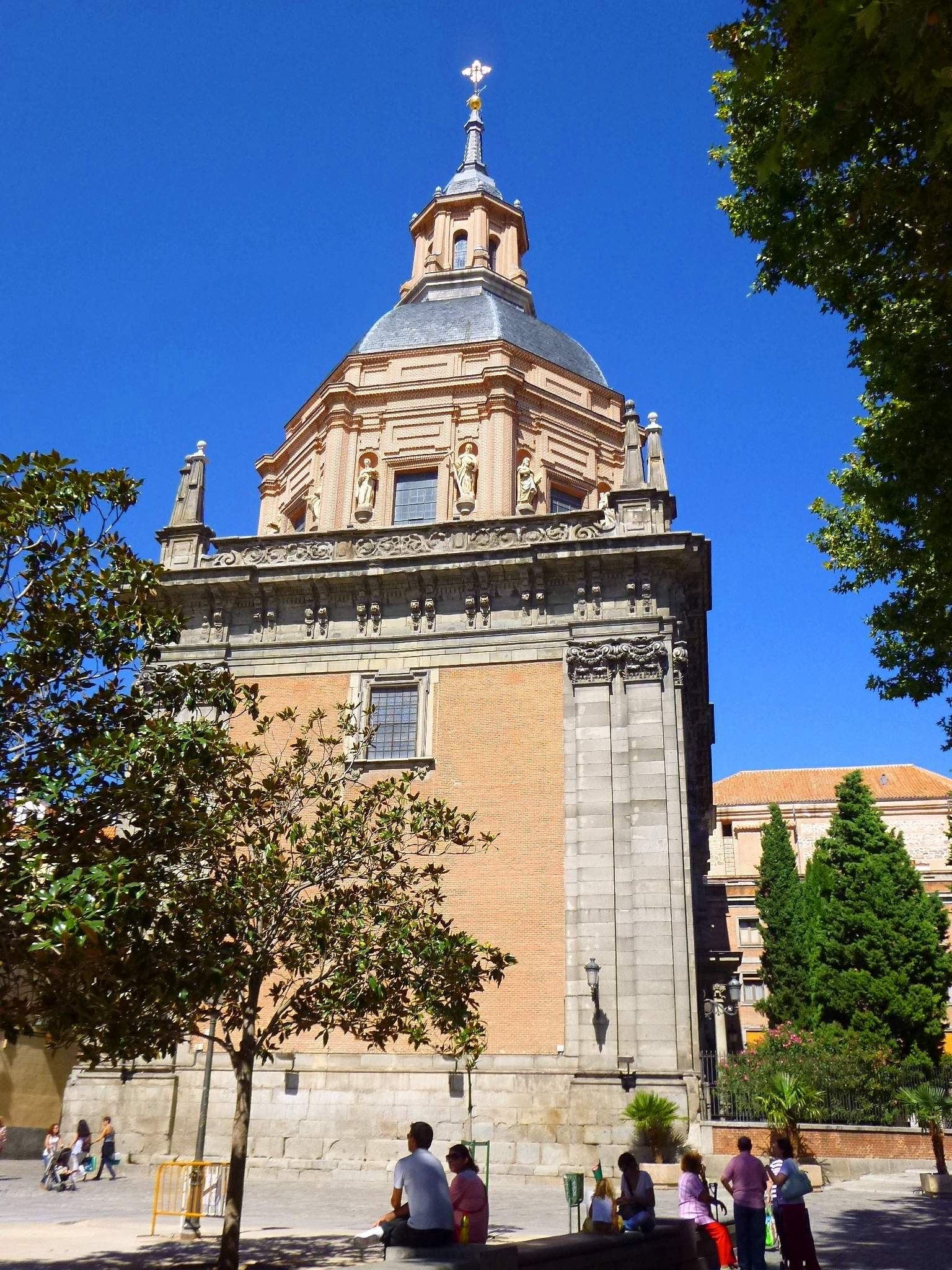
San Andrés Church (Madrid) seen from the Plaza de los Carros.

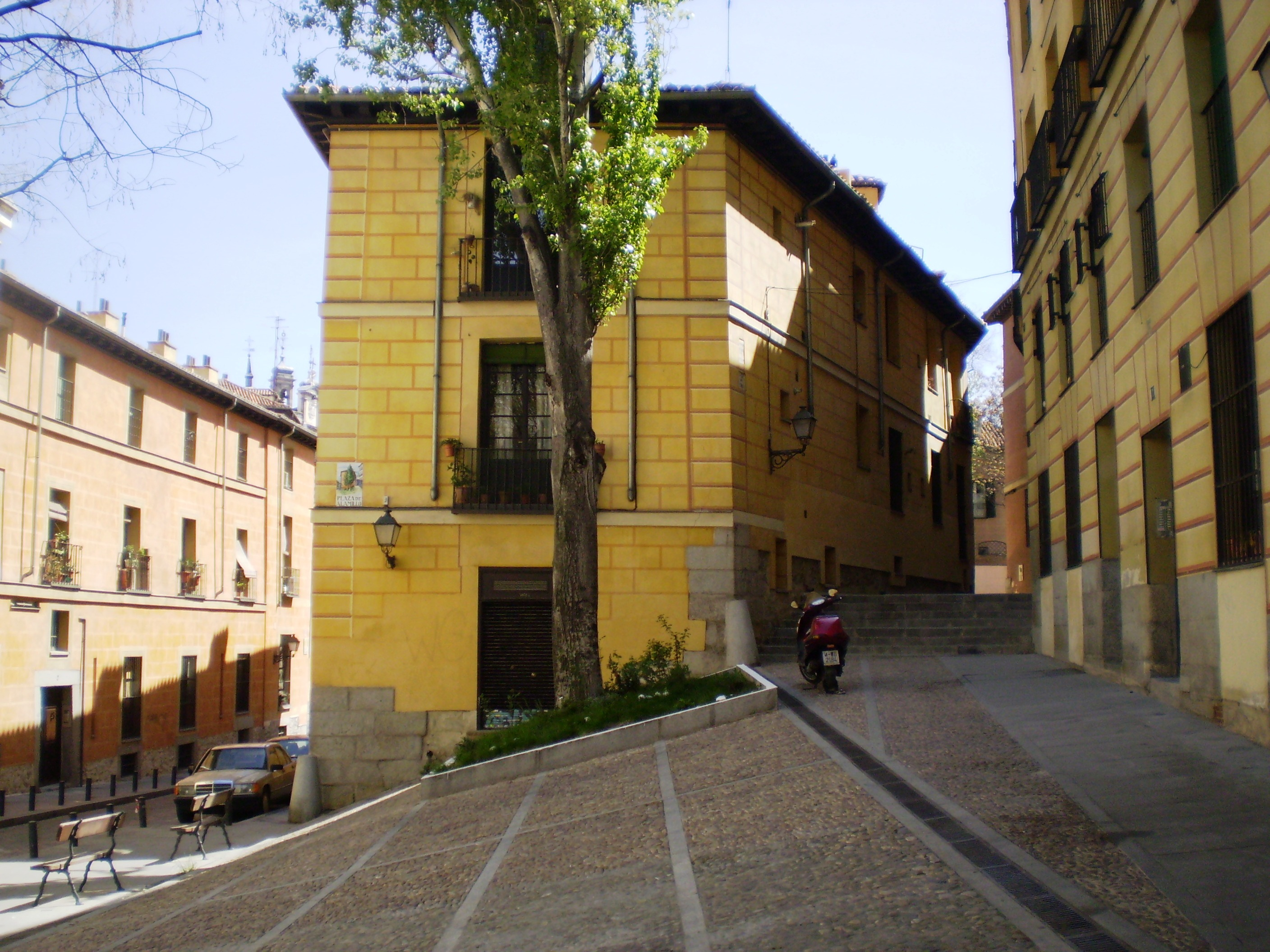
The Plaza del Alamillo with the poplar in the background.

== See also ==
- La Latina (Madrid Metro)
- Article title
