= Ópera (Madrid Metro) =

Madrid Metro station

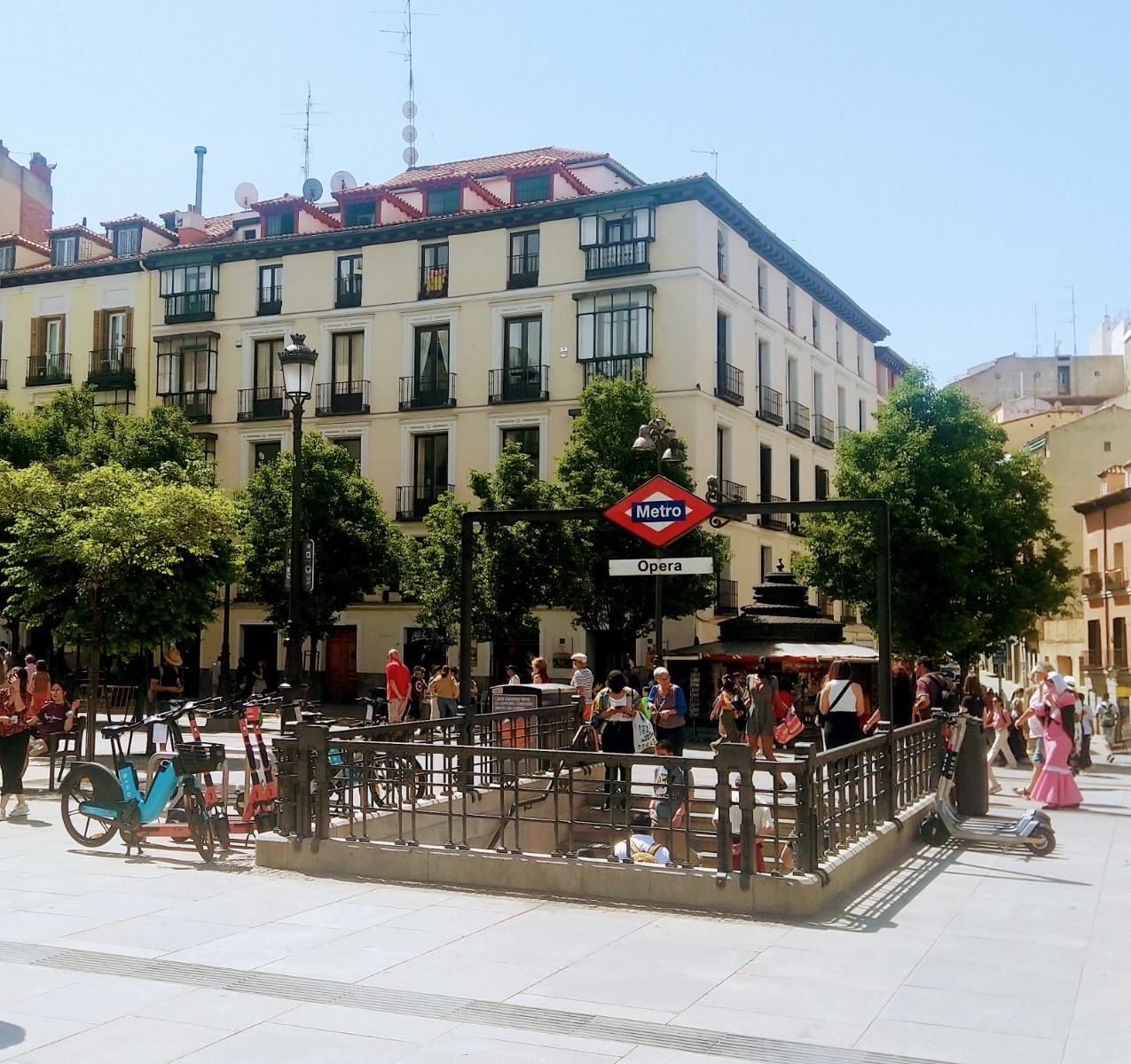
- Entrance of Ópera Metro Station

General information
- Location: Centro, Madrid; Spain
- Coordinates: 40.4181665°N 3.7094163°W
- System: Madrid Metro station
- Owner: CRTM
- Operator: CRTM

Construction
- Structure type: Underground
- Accessible: Yes

Other information
- Fare zone: A

History
- Opened: 21 October 1925; 100 years ago

Services
Preceding station	Madrid Metro	Following station
Sol towards Las Rosas	Line 2	Santo Domingo towards Cuatro Caminos
Callao towards Alameda de Osuna	Line 5	La Latina towards Casa de Campo
Terminus	Ramal	Príncipe Pío Terminus
Location
- Location within Madrid

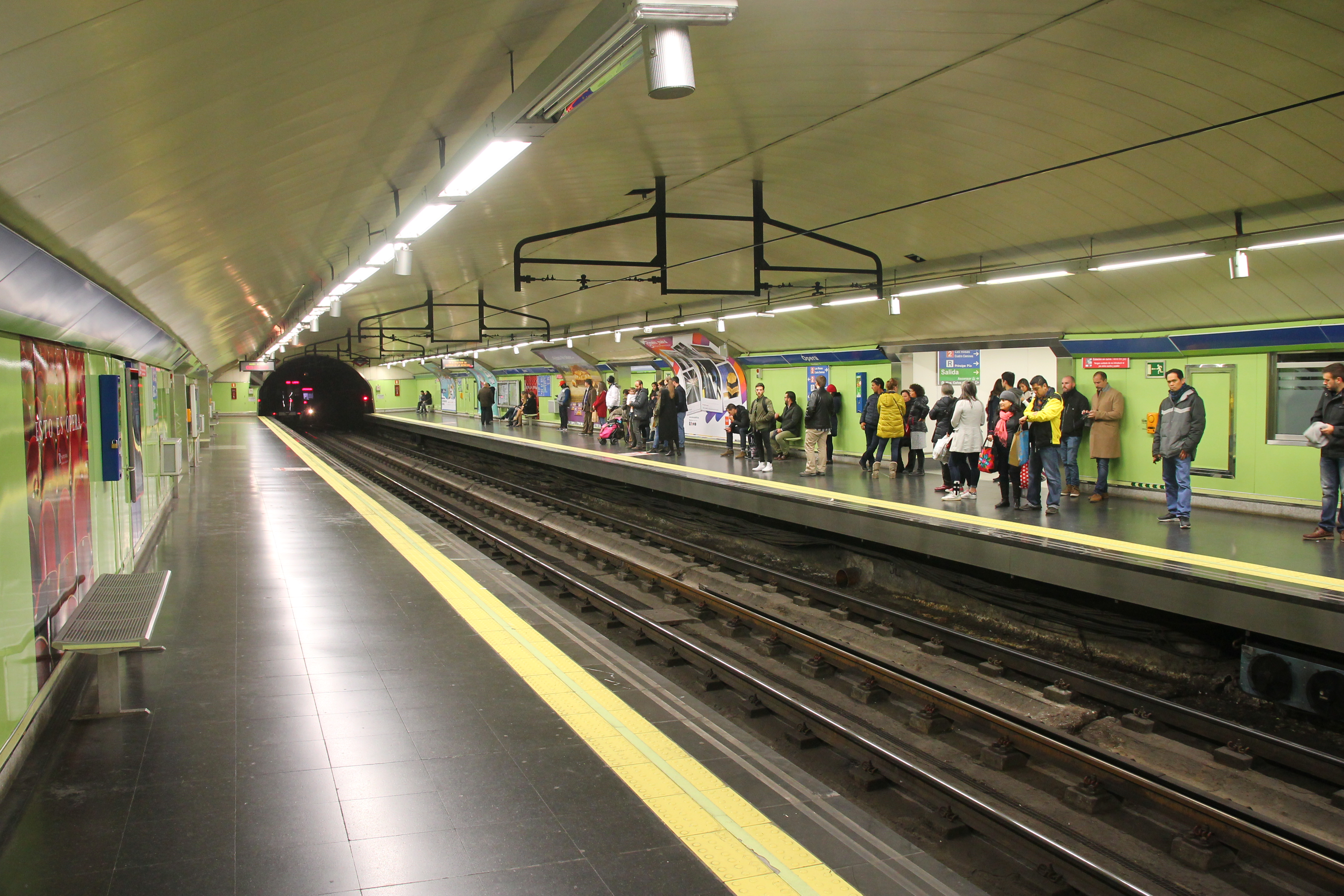
Line 5 at Ópera

Ópera [ˈo.pe.ɾa] is a station on Line 2, Line 5 and Ramal of the Metro de Madrid. It is located in fare Zone A, in the Plaza de Isabel II, in the central district of Madrid. The station provides access to an area with tourist landmarks such as the Teatro Real opera house, the Plaza de Oriente and the Royal Palace. Its name comes from nearby Madrid opera house, the Teatro Real.

== History ==
The station was opened to the public on 21 October 1925 on line 2. and Ramal later that year. Its original name was Isabel II, named for the square in which it stood. The platforms of lines 2 and Ramal are located at the same level, the former is 60 m long and the latter being shorter in the beginning, but later it was extended in length to 60 m, too.

After the proclamation of the Second Republic on 14 April 1931, the new authorities approved by Decree of 20 April the removal of all the denominations that made references to the monarchy. Therefore, on 24 June Isabel II station was renamed Ópera. That year, the square was renamed "Fermín Galán", after one of the leaders of the failed uprising in 1930 that tried to overthrow King Alfonso XIII. On 5 June 1937 the station changed its name to coincide with the square. However, after the establishment of the dictatorship of Francisco Franco there was a further change in the names of city streets, stations, etc. Therefore, in 1939 the square was again renamed "Isabel II", and the metro station recovered the name "Ópera".

On 5 June 1968 platforms on the line 5, located at greater depth and 90 m long, were opened to the public.

The station was partly renovated between 2003 and 2004.

On 23 March 2011 the station reopened after works to improve accessibility. It has a new lobby of 821 m^{2} (enlarged from 114 m^{2}), and three lifts, one from lobby to the street and two from the lobby to the different platforms. Several escalators were also installed. The entrance to the station was moved from one side of the square to a new position, with two staircases and an elevator built.

== Museo Arqueológico Caños del Peral ==
Ópera station has a museum with a floor space of 234 m^{2} where 16th- and 17th-century remains may be observed, such as the Caños del Peral Fountain, which delivered water to the Royal Palace via the Amaniel Aqueduct, as well as other water supply works discovered during the remodelling works, such as the Arenal Sewer. Users may see the remains on display at the station and visit a room equipped with an audiovisuals to learn the history of the archaeological remains found.
