= Ciudad Lineal (Madrid Metro) =

Madrid Metro station

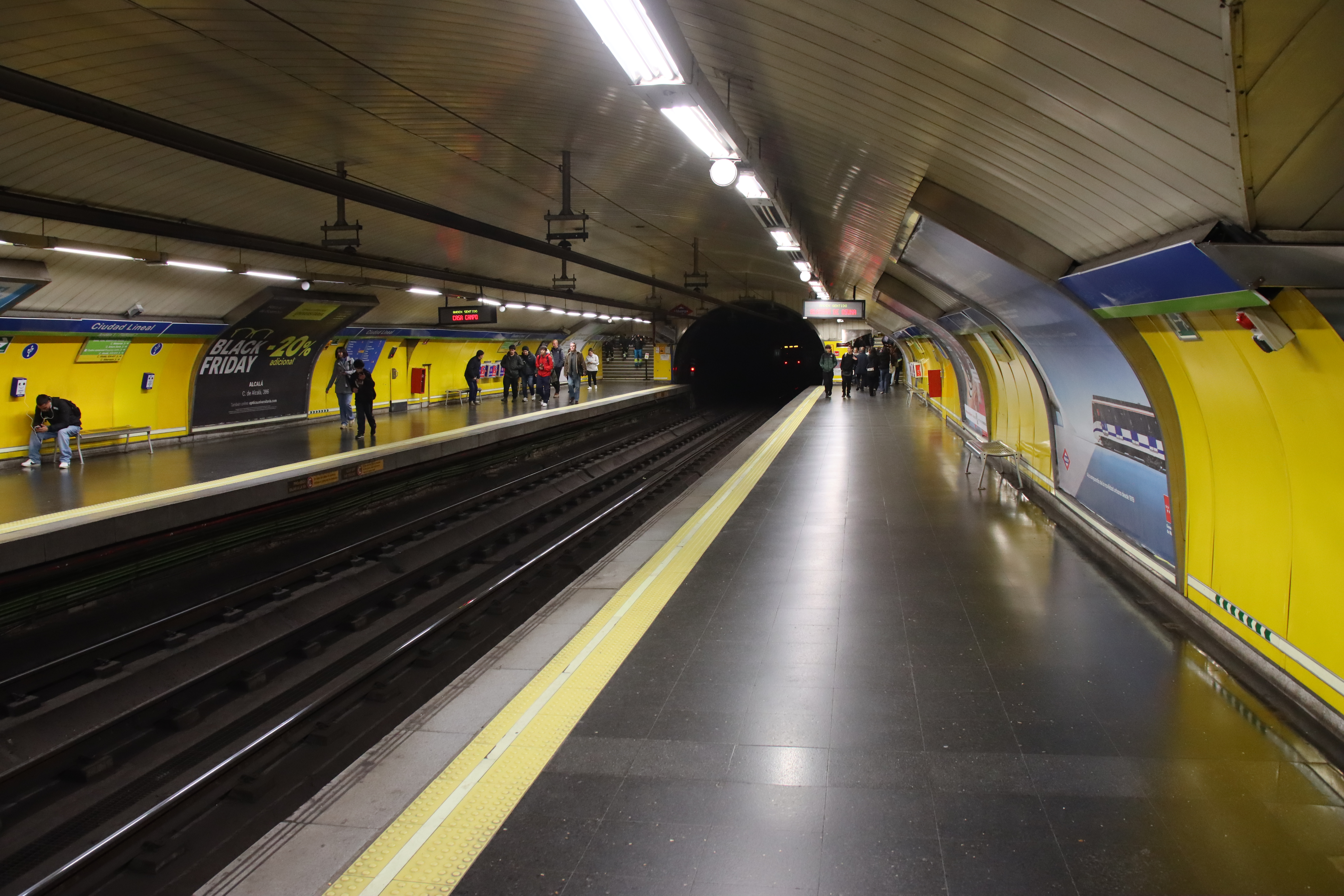

General information
- Location: Ciudad Lineal / San Blas, Madrid; Spain
- Coordinates: 40.4380469°N 3.638159°W
- System: Madrid Metro station
- Owner: CRTM
- Operator: CRTM

Construction
- Accessible: No

Other information
- Fare zone: A

History
- Opened: 28 May 1964

Services
| Preceding station | Madrid Metro | Following station |
|---|---|---|
| Suanzes towards Alameda de Osuna | Line 5 | Pueblo Nuevo towards Casa de Campo |
Location
- Location within Madrid

Ciudad Lineal [θjuˈðað lineˈal] is a station on Line 5 of the Madrid Metro, named for the Ciudad Lineal district. It is located in fare Zone A.

The station serves an important urban and regional bus terminal.
