= Urgel (Madrid Metro) =

Madrid Metro station

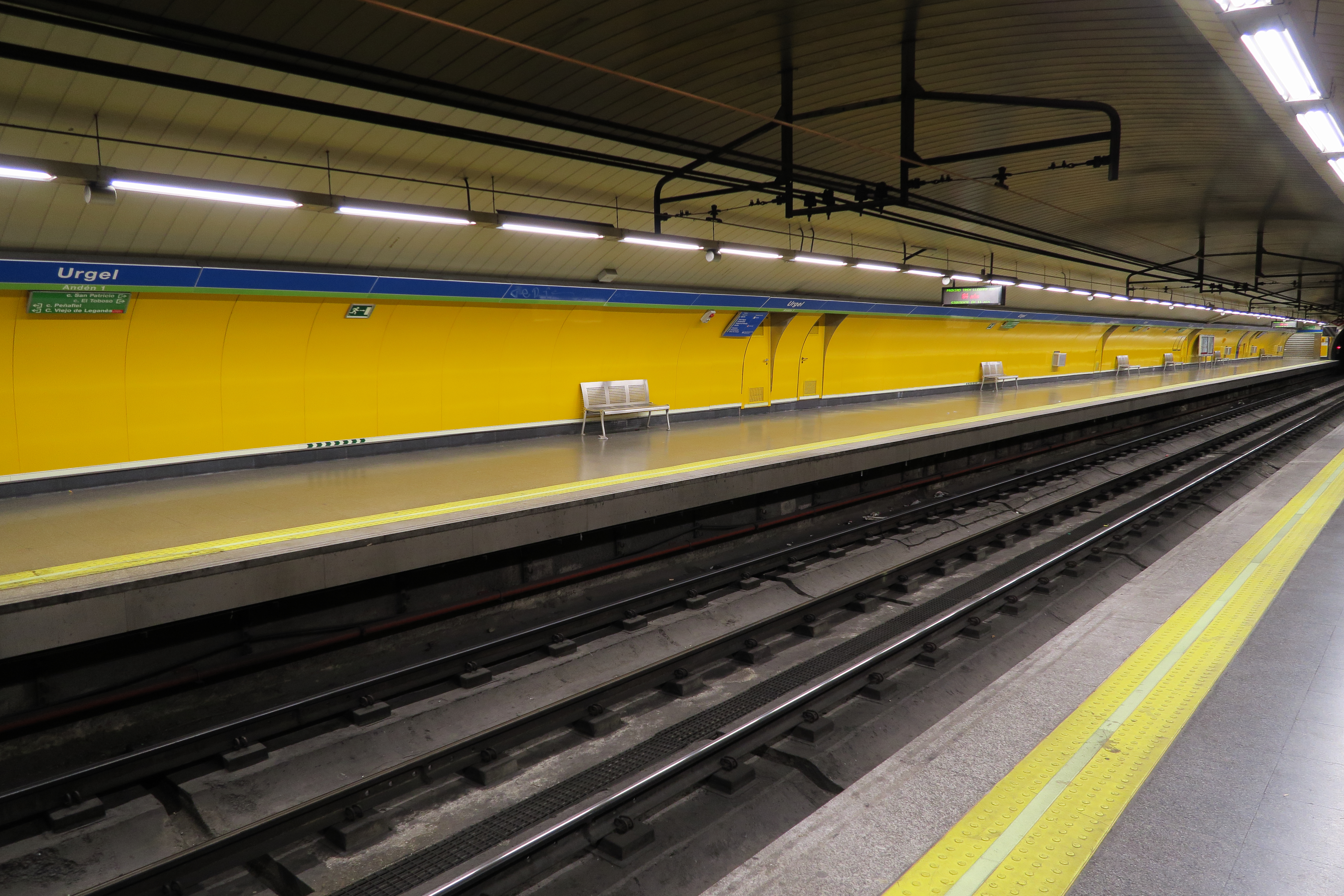
- Platforms of the station

General information
- Location: Carabanchel, Madrid; Spain
- Coordinates: 40.3929839°N 3.7244253°W
- System: Madrid Metro station
- Owner: CRTM
- Operator: CRTM

Construction
- Accessible: No

Other information
- Fare zone: A

History
- Opened: 5 June 1968

Services
Preceding station	Madrid Metro	Following station
Marqués de Vadillo towards Alameda de Osuna	Line 5	Oporto towards Casa de Campo
Location
- Location within Madrid

Urgel [uɾˈɣel] is a station on Line 5 of the Madrid Metro, named for the Calle de Urgel ("Urgell Street") nearby. It is located in fare Zone A.
