= Eugenia de Montijo (Madrid Metro) =

Madrid Metro station

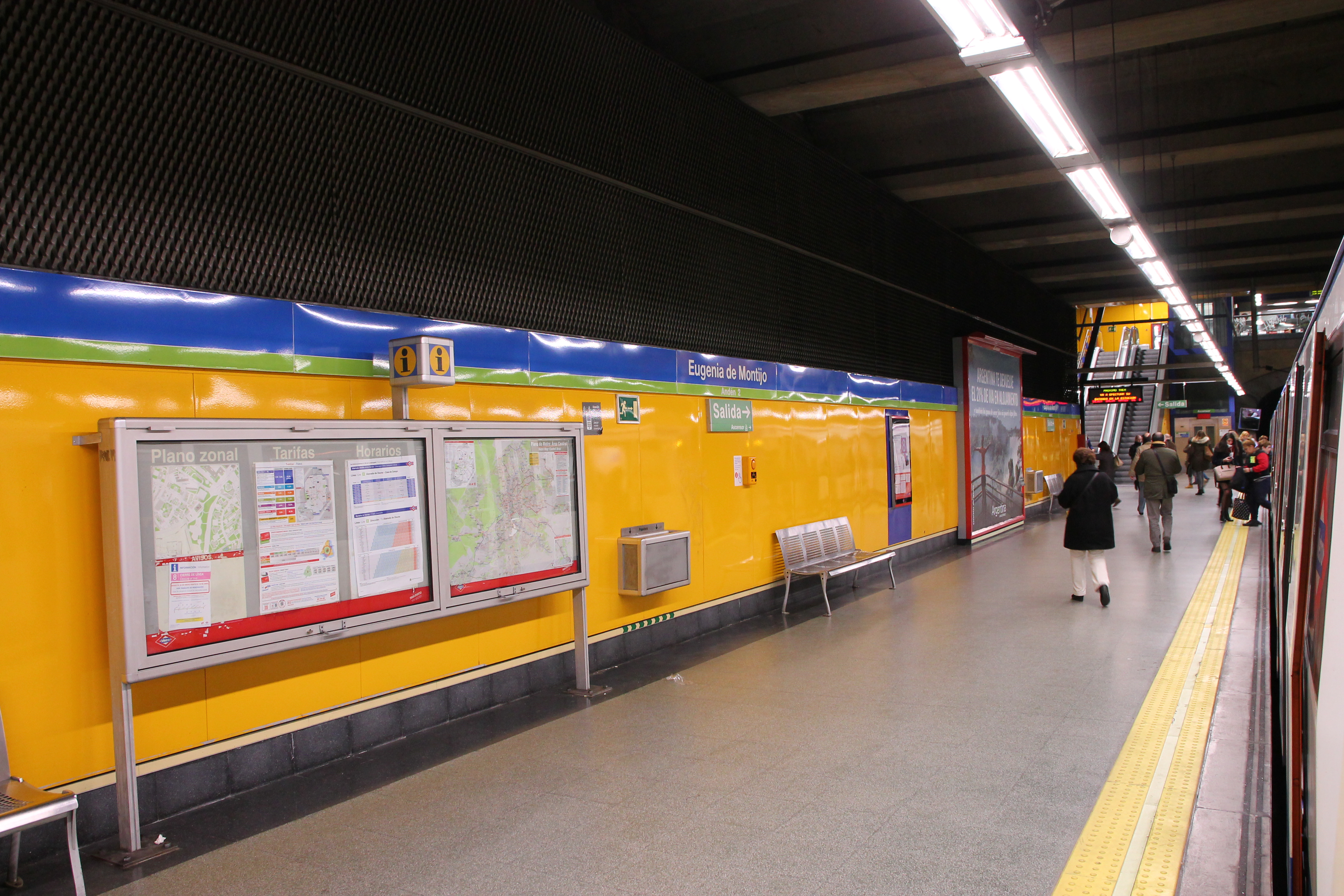

General information
- Location: Carabanchel / Latina, Madrid; Spain
- Coordinates: 40.3843858°N 3.7512112°W
- System: Madrid Metro station
- Owner: CRTM
- Operator: CRTM

Construction
- Accessible: yes

Other information
- Fare zone: A

History
- Opened: 27 October 1999

Services
Preceding station	Madrid Metro	Following station
Carabanchel towards Alameda de Osuna	Line 5	Aluche towards Casa de Campo
Location
- Location within Madrid

Eugenia de Montijo [ewˈxenja ðe monˈtixo] is a station on Line 5 of the Madrid Metro, named for the Calle de Eugenia de Montijo, which is named after Eugénie de Montijo (1826–1920), a Spanish noblewoman who was Empress of the French as wife of Napoléon III. It is located in fare Zone A.
