= Carabanchel (Madrid Metro) =

Madrid Metro station

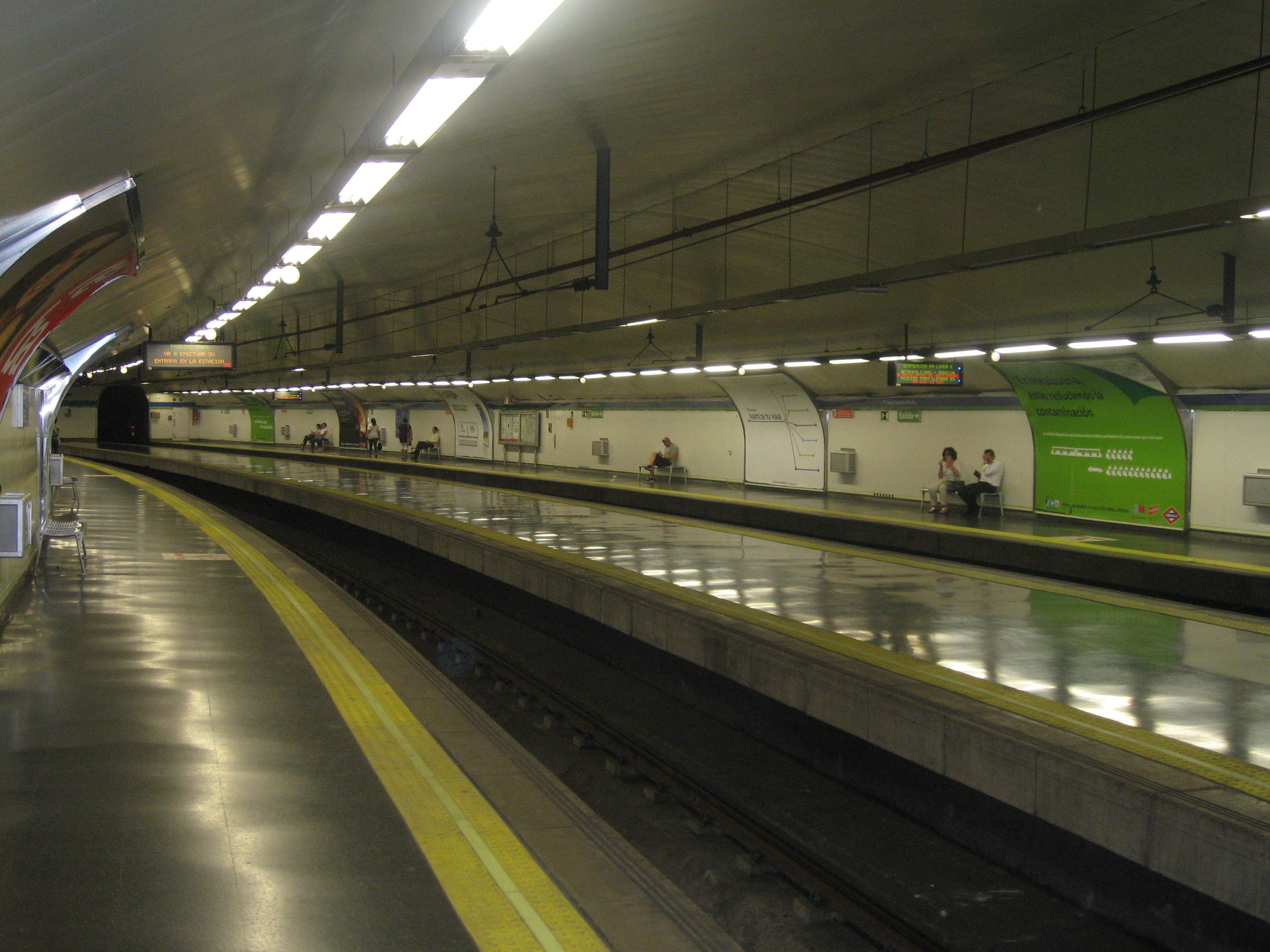

General information
- Location: Carabanchel, Madrid; Spain
- Coordinates: 40.3878228°N 3.7448761°W
- System: Madrid Metro station
- Owner: CRTM
- Operator: CRTM

Construction
- Accessible: No

Other information
- Fare zone: A

History
- Opened: 4 February 1961

Services
Preceding station	Madrid Metro	Following station
Vista Alegre towards Alameda de Osuna	Line 5	Eugenia de Montijo towards Casa de Campo
Location
- Location within Madrid

Carabanchel [kaɾaβanˈtʃel] is a station on Line 5 of the Madrid Metro, serving the Carabanchel area. It is located in fare Zone A.
