= Suanzes =

Suanzes may refer to:

== Places ==
- Suanzes (Madrid Metro), a station on Line 5

== People ==
- Daniel Varela Suanzes-Carpegna (born 1951), Spanish politician
- Juan Antonio Suanzes (1891–1977), Spanish soldier and engineer

== See also ==
- Suances, a municipality in Cantabria, Spain
