= Aluche (Madrid Metro) =

Madrid Metro station

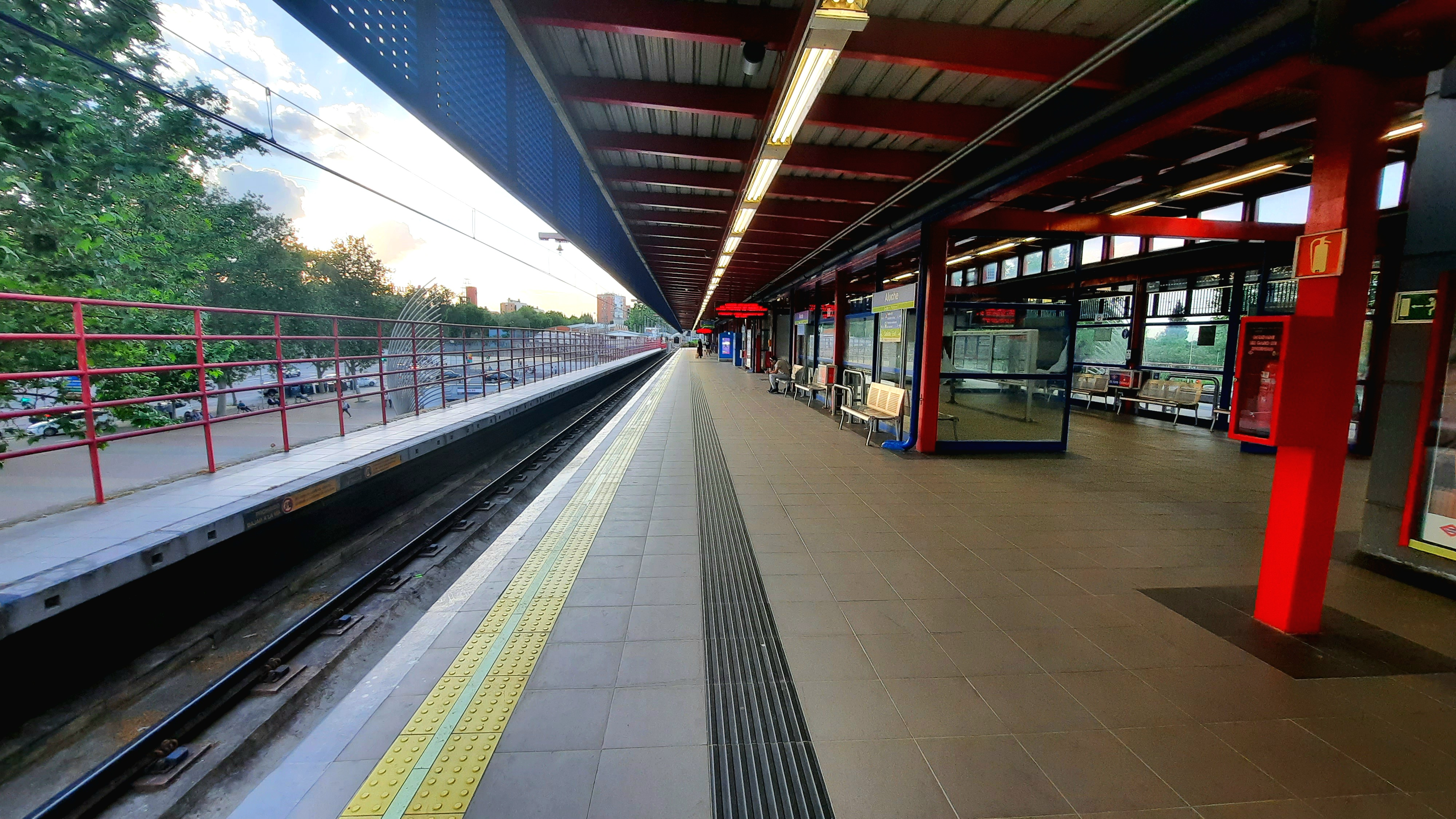

General information
- Location: Latina, Madrid; Spain
- Coordinates: 40.3856286°N 3.7608513°W
- System: Madrid Metro station
- Owner: CRTM
- Operator: CRTM

Construction
- Structure type: Elevated
- Accessible: yes

Other information
- Fare zone: A

History
- Opened: 4 February 1961

Services
Preceding station	Madrid Metro	Following station
Eugenia de Montijo towards Alameda de Osuna	Line 5	Empalme towards Casa de Campo
Out of system interchange
Preceding station	Cercanías Madrid	Following station
Maestra Justa Freire-Polideportivo Aluche towards Móstoles-El Soto	C-5	Laguna towards Humanes
Location
- Location within Madrid

Aluche [aˈlutʃe] is a station on Line 5 of the Madrid Metro and line C-5 on Cercanías, serving the Aluche barrio. It is located in fare Zone A. The station offers connection to Cercanías Madrid via Aluche railway station.

Aluche is one of the few Madrid Metro stations that is elevated instead of underground, and also one of the few Madrid Metro stations with an island platform instead of side platforms. It was originally a station on the Suburbano, which later became Line 10. However, when Line 10 was re-routed, Aluche became part of Line 5, where it remains today.
