= Callao (Madrid Metro) =

Madrid Metro station

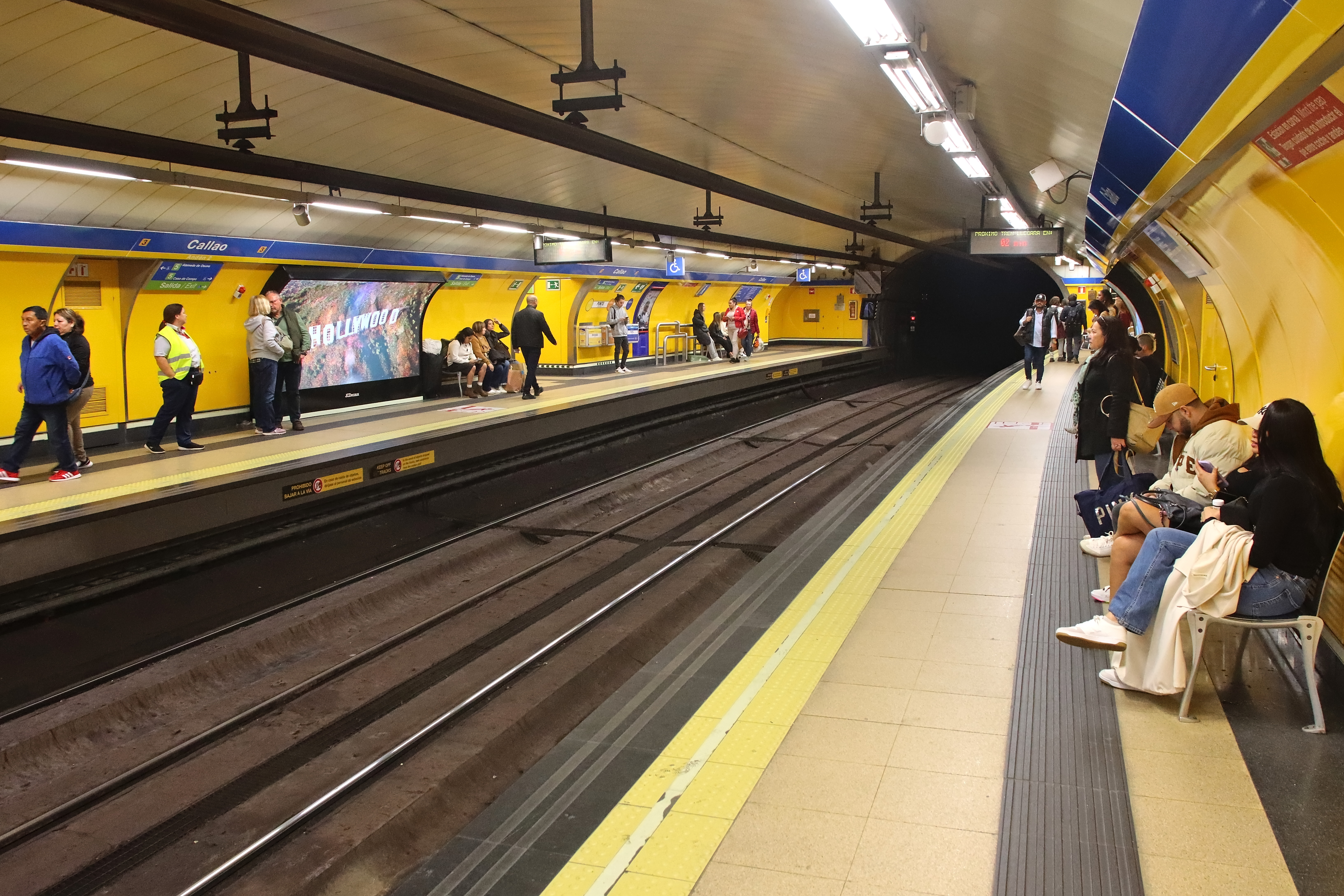

General information
- Location: Centro, Madrid; Spain
- Coordinates: 40.4201343°N 3.7057717°W
- System: Madrid Metro station
- Owner: CRTM
- Operator: CRTM

Construction
- Structure type: Underground
- Accessible: Yes

Other information
- Fare zone: A

History
- Opened: 15 July 1941; 85 years ago

Services
Preceding station	Madrid Metro	Following station
Sol towards El Casar	Line 3	Plaza de España towards Moncloa
Gran Vía towards Alameda de Osuna	Line 5	Ópera towards Casa de Campo
Location
- Location within Madrid

Callao [kaˈʝao] is a station on Line 3 and Line 5 of the Madrid Metro. It is located in fare Zone A. It is named after the Plaza del Callao, under which it is located.
