= Suanzes (Madrid Metro) =

Madrid Metro station

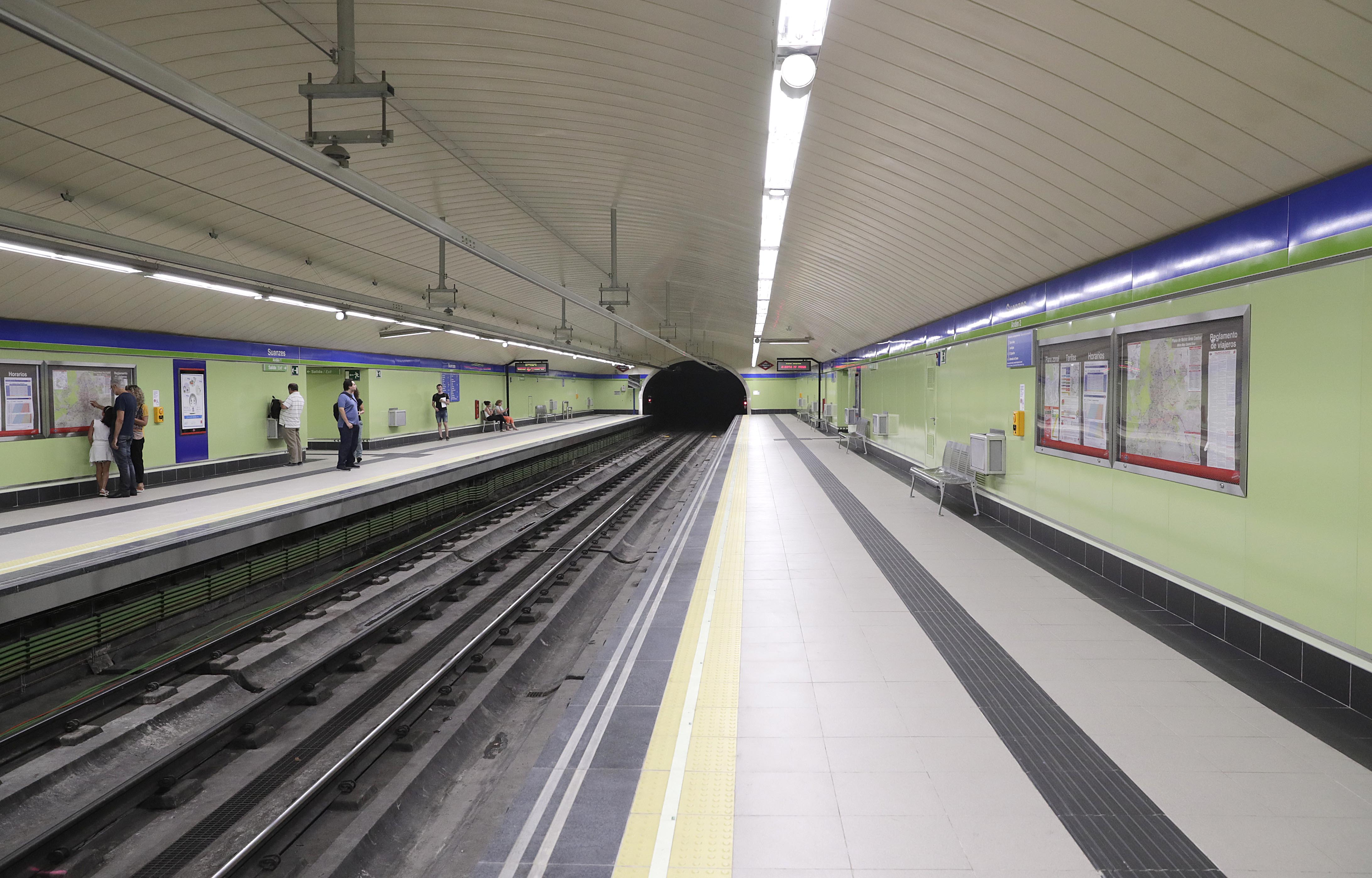
- Platforms of the station

General information
- Location: San Blas, Madrid; Spain
- Coordinates: 40.4407959°N 3.6268962°W
- System: Madrid Metro station
- Owner: CRTM
- Operator: CRTM

Construction
- Accessible: No

Other information
- Fare zone: A

History
- Opened: 18 January 1980

Services
Preceding station	Madrid Metro	Following station
Torre Arias towards Alameda de Osuna	Line 5	Ciudad Lineal towards Casa de Campo
Location
- Location within Madrid

Suanzes [ˈswan.θes] is a station on Line 5 of the Madrid Metro, located near the Parque Marques De Suances, which derives its name from the naval engineer Juan Antonio Suanzes (1891–1977). The naming has been controversial due to Suanzes' connection to the Franco regime, and changing the name was proposed in 2017. It is located in fare Zone A.
