= Puerta de Toledo (Madrid Metro) =

Madrid Metro station

- Platforms of the station

General information
- Location: Arganzuela / Centro, Madrid; Spain
- Coordinates: 40.4068115°N 3.7108159°W
- System: Madrid Metro station
- Owner: CRTM
- Operator: CRTM

Construction
- Accessible: No

Other information
- Fare zone: A

History
- Opened: 5 June 1968

Services
Preceding station	Madrid Metro	Following station
La Latina towards Alameda de Osuna	Line 5	Acacias towards Casa de Campo
Location
- Location within Madrid

Puerta de Toledo [ˈpweɾta ðe toˈleðo] is a station on Line 5 of the Madrid Metro, located under the Puerta de Toledo. It is located in fare Zone A.
