= Ramal (Madrid Metro) =

Rapid transit line of the Madrid Metro

Ramal Ópera–Príncipe Pío
- A Class 3000 train at Príncipe Pío station

Overview
- Native name: Línea R
- Owner: CRTM
- Locale: Madrid
- Stations: 2
- Website: Official website

Service
- Type: Rapid transit
- System: Madrid Metro
- Operator: CRTM
- Rolling stock: CAF 3000

History
- Opened: 27 December 1925; 100 years ago

Technical
- Line length: 1.092 km (0.679 mi)
- Character: Underground
- Track gauge: 1,445 mm (4 ft 8 7/8 in)

The Ramal Ópera–Príncipe Pío (Note: Spanish for "Ópera–Príncipe Pío branch"), also known simply as the Ramal (Spanish pronunciation: [raˈmal]) or line R, is the shortest line of the Madrid Metro. It is a 1.1-kilometre-long (0.68 mi) shuttle service, connecting the stations of Ópera and Príncipe Pío with no intermediate stops. It is located entirely in the Centro district of Madrid, Spain.

It is the only line in the system to be known by a letter instead of a number, and its name refers to its origins as a branch of line 2.

The Ramal starts at Ópera station in the Plaza de Isabel II, passes under the Plaza de Oriente and the gardens of the Royal Palace of Madrid, and ends at Príncipe Pío station. Since the Ramal consists of only two stations, it has only two trains, which pass at the halfway point between the stations. At Ópera, there is only one platform; at Príncipe Pío, there are two platforms, but one is used for train storage. The Ramal uses 4-car CAF Series 3000 trains.

== History ==
The Ramal opened on 27 December 1925 as a branch of line 2 providing service to the Estación del Norte (now Príncipe Pío), which was one of the city's major railway stations at the time. Since the Estación del Norte was located on the banks of the Manzanares River, the Ramal helped travellers avoid climbing the Cuesta de San Vicente, a hillside between the river and the city center.

The Ramal's two stations experienced several name changes over the course of their history. Ópera station was originally named Isabel II, after the adjacent Plaza de Isabel II, which was in turn named after Queen Isabella II. After the proclamation of the Second Spanish Republic on 14 April 1931, the new authorities ordered all place names referring to the monarchy to be changed; as a result, on 24 June 1931, Isabel II station was renamed Ópera after the nearby Teatro Real opera house. That same year, the plaza was renamed Plaza de Fermín Galán, after Fermín Galán, the leader of the failed Jaca uprising of 1930, which sought to overthrow King Alfonso XIII. On 5 June 1937, the station too was renamed Fermín Galán. After the establishment of the Franco dictatorship in 1939, many of the city's place names were changed once again. In 1939, the plaza's name was changed back to Plaza de Isabel II, and the station's name was changed back to Ópera.

Meanwhile, at the other end of the line, Príncipe Pío station was originally named Estación del Norte ("North Station"), which reflected its status as Madrid's main station for medium- and long-distance train services towards the northern half of the country. However, the 1960s saw the opening of Chamartín station, which was located even further north within Madrid, and over the next few decades almost all non-suburban trains were gradually moved to this new station. By the 1990s only a handful of regional trains remained at Estación del Norte, so this name was deemed no longer appropriate; therefore, in 1995, the station was renamed Príncipe Pío after a nearby hill, as part of a much larger scheme to turn the station from an underused inter-regional terminus into a major local interchange.

== Stations ==
| District | Station | Opened | Zone | Connections |
|---|---|---|---|---|
| Moncloa-Aravaca | Príncipe Pío | 1925 | A | Madrid Metro: Cercanías Madrid: |
| Centro | Ópera | 1925 | A | Madrid Metro: |

== See also ==
- Madrid
- Transport in Madrid
- List of Madrid Metro stations
- List of metro systems
