= Pirámides (Madrid Metro) =

Madrid Metro station

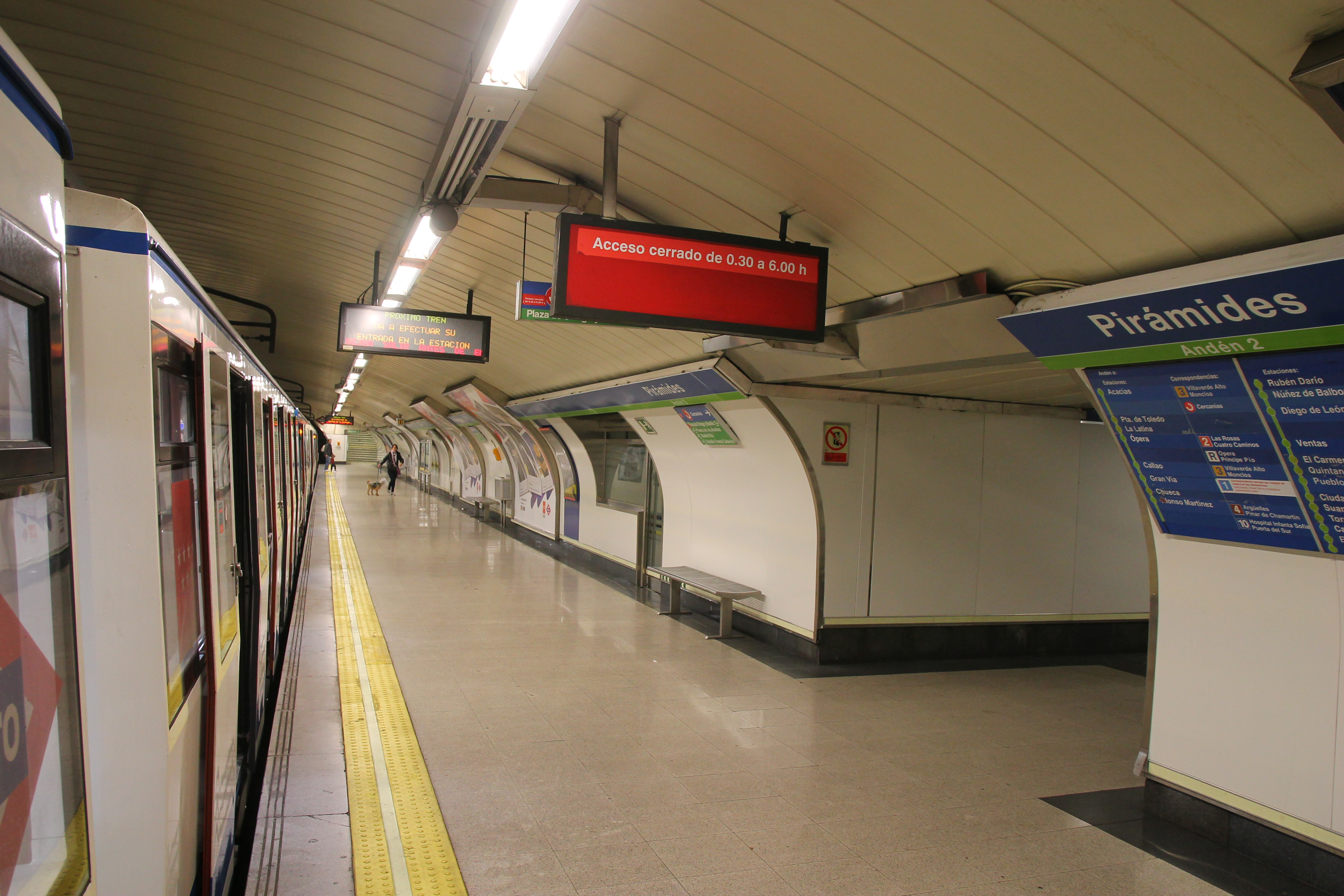

General information
- Location: Arganzuela, Madrid; Spain
- Coordinates: 40.4026015°N 3.7113817°W
- System: Madrid Metro station
- Owner: CRTM
- Operator: CRTM

Construction
- Accessible: yes

Other information
- Fare zone: A

History
- Opened: 5 June 1968

Services
Preceding station	Madrid Metro	Following station
Acacias towards Alameda de Osuna	Line 5	Marqués de Vadillo towards Casa de Campo
Out of system interchange
Preceding station	Cercanías Madrid	Following station
Príncipe Pío Terminus	C-1	Delicias towards Aeropuerto T4
Príncipe Pío towards Villalba	C-10	Delicias towards Chamartín
Location
- Location within Madrid

Pirámides [piˈɾamiðes] is a Madrid Metro station in Madrid city centre. It was opened on 5 June 1968 and is one of the oldest stations on Line 5 of the Madrid Metro, located near the Glorieta de las Pirámides ("Pyramids Roundabout," named for the 19th-century obelisks inside it). The station also offers interchange with Cercanías Madrid via Pirámides railway station and is located in fare Zone A.
