= Line 5 (Madrid Metro) =

Rapid transit line of the Madrid Metro

Coordinates: 40.4328°N 3.6831°W

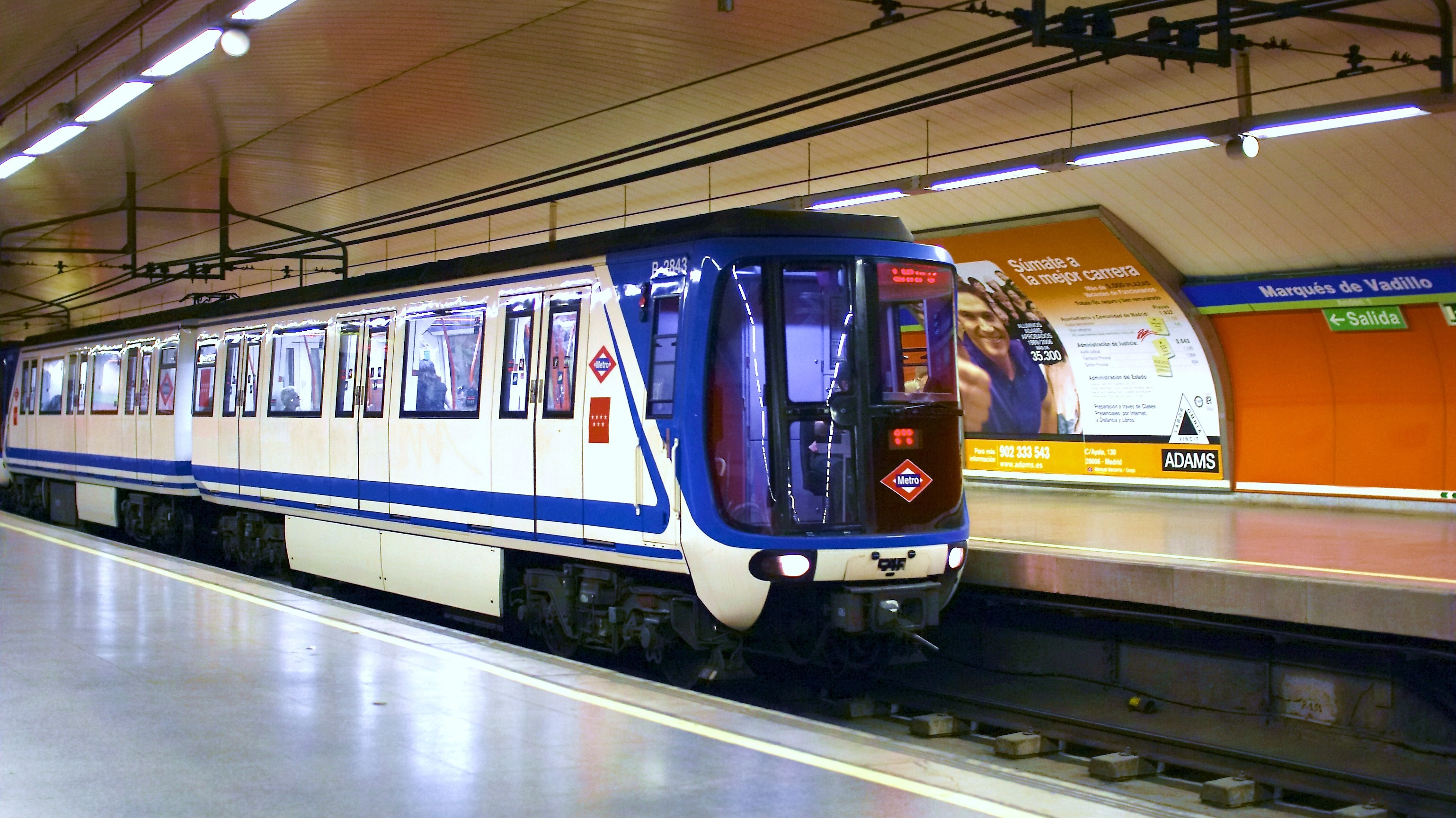
- A Class 2000B train at Marqués de Vadillo station

Overview
- Native name: Línea 5
- Owner: CRTM
- Locale: Madrid
- Termini: Casa de Campo; Alameda de Osuna
- Stations: 32
- Website: metromadrid.es/en/linea/linea-5

Service
- Type: Rapid transit
- System: Madrid Metro
- Operator: CRTM
- Rolling stock: CAF 2000-B and 3000

History
- Opened: 5 June 1968; 58 years ago
- Last extension: 2006

Technical
- Line length: 23.217 km (14.426 mi)
- Character: Underground, at-grade
- Track gauge: 1,445 mm (4 ft 8 7/8 in)

Map of the line 5.

Line 5 is a rapid transit line in the Madrid Metro system since 5 June 1968. It is the fourth most used line of the Madrid system, transporting 64 million passengers a year. It is 27 kilometers long.

Line 5 also contains the only elevated ground platform in the Madrid Metro, at Aluche station. Aluche is also the only station where the metro is above the Cercanías commuter train, which generally runs above ground.

== History ==
Line 5 was opened on 5 June 1968 and originally ran between Callao and Carabanchel, with the Carabanchel station also running with what was then called Line S (for Suburbano).

On 2 March 1970, the line was extended from Callao to Ciudad Lineal, however the section between Ventas and Ciudad Lineal originally opened in 1964 as part of Line 2.

In 1976, section of Line S from Carabanchel to Aluche was transferred to Line 5 in order to provide an easier transfer to downtown to new railroad line to Alcorcón and Móstoles, now part of Cercanías C-5 line. On 28 May 1980 the line was extended from Ciudad Lineal to Canillejas.

On the 27 October 1999, Eugenia de Montijo was added as an infill station between Aluche and Carabanchel. The station is on the tunnel mouth of the line and is therefore at-grade.

The mostly overground section between Aluche and Casa de Campo was transferred to Line 5 after Line 10 was extended south from Casa de Campo on 22 May 2002. On 24 November 2006, a two stop extension from Canillejas to Alameda de Osuna was opened.

=== 2017 improvements ===
Line 5 was closed during the summer of 2017 for renovation. The renovation lasted 62 days and cost an estimated €66.5 million. Among the changes, more than 256,000 metres (840,000 ft) of signaling cables were replaced, along with 42,000 metres (138,000 ft) of fiber optic cable, 68,000 metres (223,000 ft) of lighting, and 18,000 metres (59,000 ft) of radiating cable.

== Future ==
Line 5 is to be extended through the town of Barajas and ultimately connect with Valdebebas railway station, which at the time only serves the Cercanías network. Completion is scheduled for 2028 as of 2026.

== Rolling stock ==
Line 5 uses 6-car trains of mainly class 2000B, however there are a few class 2000As running on the line. It was the last line built in a narrow profile and gauge.

== Stations ==
District	Station	Opened	Zone	Connections
Latina / Moncloa-Aravaca	Casa de Campo	2002	A	Madrid Metro:
Latina	Campamento	1961	A	
Latina	Empalme	1961	A	
Latina	Aluche	1961	A	Cercanías Madrid:
Latina	Eugenia de Montijo	1999	A	
Carabanchel	Carabanchel	1961	A	
Carabanchel	Vista Alegre	1968	A	
Carabanchel	Oporto	1968	A	Madrid Metro:
Carabanchel	Urgel	1968	A	
Carabanchel	Marqués de Vadillo	1968	A	
Arganzuela	Pirámides	1968	A	Cercanías Madrid:
Arganzuela	Acacias	1968	A	Cercanías Madrid:
Arganzuela / Centro	Puerta de Toledo	1968	A	
Centro	La Latina	1968	A	
Centro	Ópera	1925	A	Madrid Metro:
Centro	Callao	1941	A	Madrid Metro:
Centro	Gran Vía	1919	A	Madrid Metro: Cercanías Madrid:
Centro	Chueca	1970	A	
Centro / Chamberí	Alonso Martínez	1944	A	Madrid Metro:
Chamberí	Rubén Darío	1970	A	
Salamanca	Núñez de Balboa	1970	A	Madrid Metro:
Salamanca	Diego de León	1932	A	Madrid Metro:
Salamanca	Ventas	1924	A	Madrid Metro:
Ciudad Lineal	El Carmen	1964	A	
Ciudad Lineal	Quintana	1964	A	
Ciudad Lineal	Pueblo Nuevo	1964	A	Madrid Metro:
Ciudad Lineal / San Blas-Canillejas	Ciudad Lineal	1964	A	
San Blas-Canillejas	Suanzes	1980	A	
San Blas-Canillejas	Torre Arias	1980	A	
San Blas-Canillejas	Canillejas	1980	A	
Barajas	El Capricho	2006	A	
Barajas	Alameda de Osuna	2006	A	

== Gallery ==
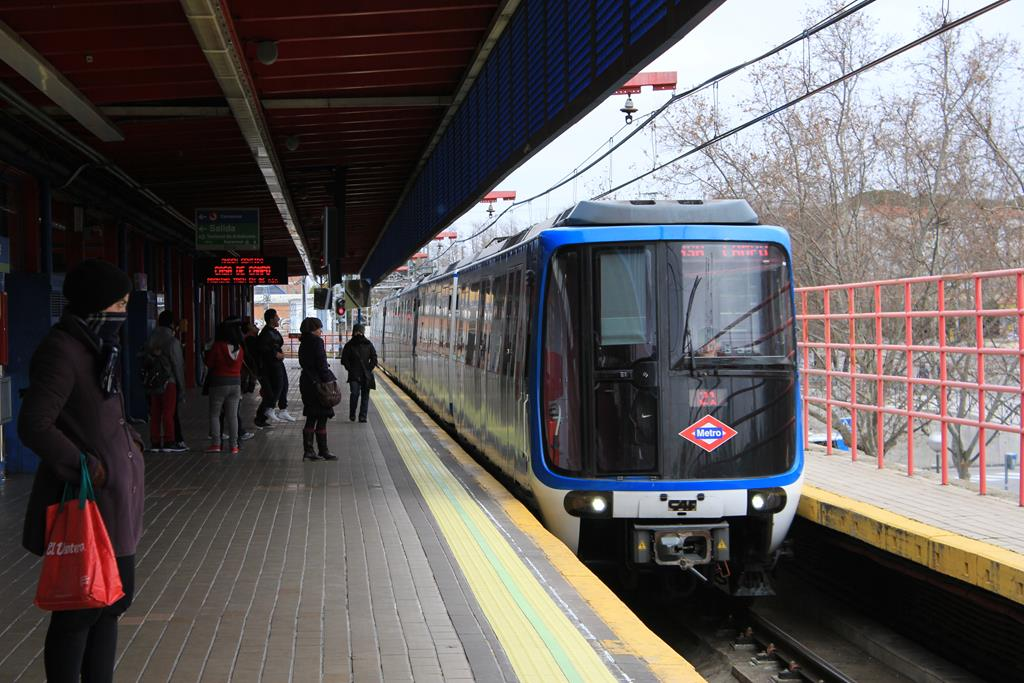
The above ground island platform at Aluche

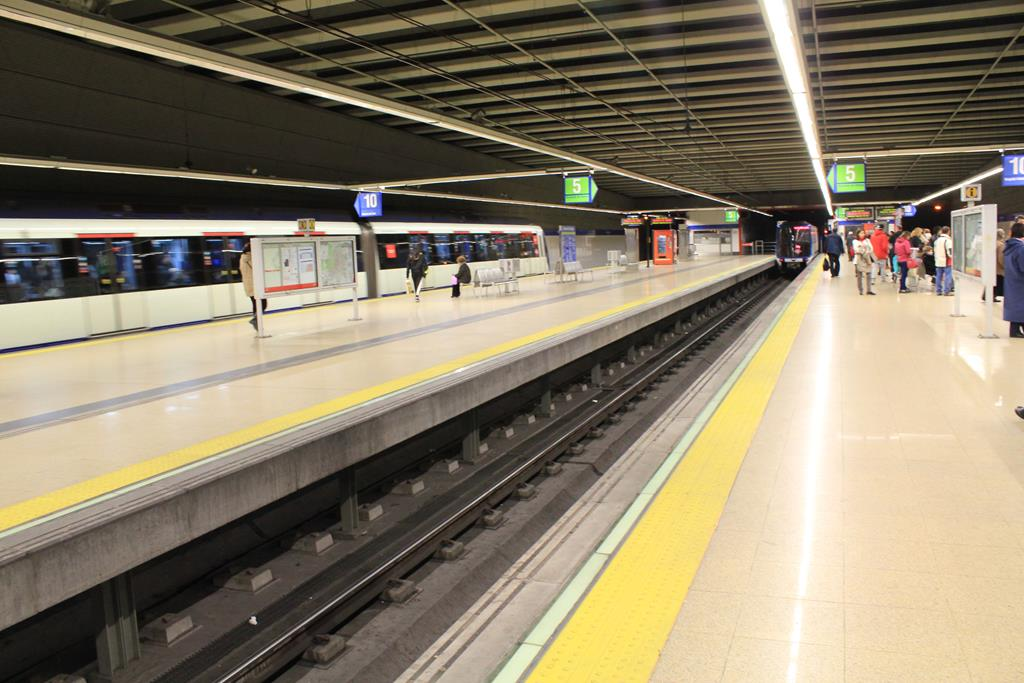
The terminal station at Casa de Campo

== See also ==
- Madrid
- Transport in Madrid
- List of Madrid Metro stations
- List of metro systems
