= Casa de Campo (Madrid Metro) =

Madrid Metro station

- Platforms of Line 5 and Line 10

General information
- Location: Latina / Moncloa-Aravaca, Madrid; Spain
- Coordinates: 40.4032414°N 3.7610123°W
- System: Madrid Metro station
- Owner: CRTM
- Operator: CRTM
- Platforms: 2 island platforms
- Tracks: 3 (provision for 4 tracks)

Construction
- Accessible: yes

Other information
- Fare zone: A

History
- Opened: 22 October 2002; 23 years ago

Services
Preceding station	Madrid Metro	Following station
Campamento towards Alameda de Osuna	Line 5	Terminus
Batán towards Hospital Infanta Sofía	Line 10	Colonia Jardín towards Puerta del Sur
Location
- Location within Madrid

Casa de Campo [ˈkasa ðe ˈkampo] is a cross-platform interchange station on Line 5 and Line 10 of the Madrid Metro that is situated near the Paseo de la Puerta de Batán in the Moncloa-Aravaca district and the Casa de Campo barrio. It is located in fare Zone A.

The Madrid Zoo is located 500 m (1,600 ft) from the station's entrance.

== History ==
The station was opened on 22 October 2002 as part of the extension of Line 10 from Batán to Puerta del Sur, which was one of two parts of the Metrosur expansion project. As part of the project, the segment between Casa de Campo and Aluche was transferred to Line 5; the station itself was designed to have space for four tracks, and two island platforms, but one of the tracks is covered by an expanded island platform to enable cross-platform transfers between Line 5 and Line 10. Prior to the construction of the station, Line 10 trains passed through the station site without stopping, so this station is considered to be an infill station on Line 10.
