= Alameda de Osuna (Madrid Metro) =

Madrid Metro station

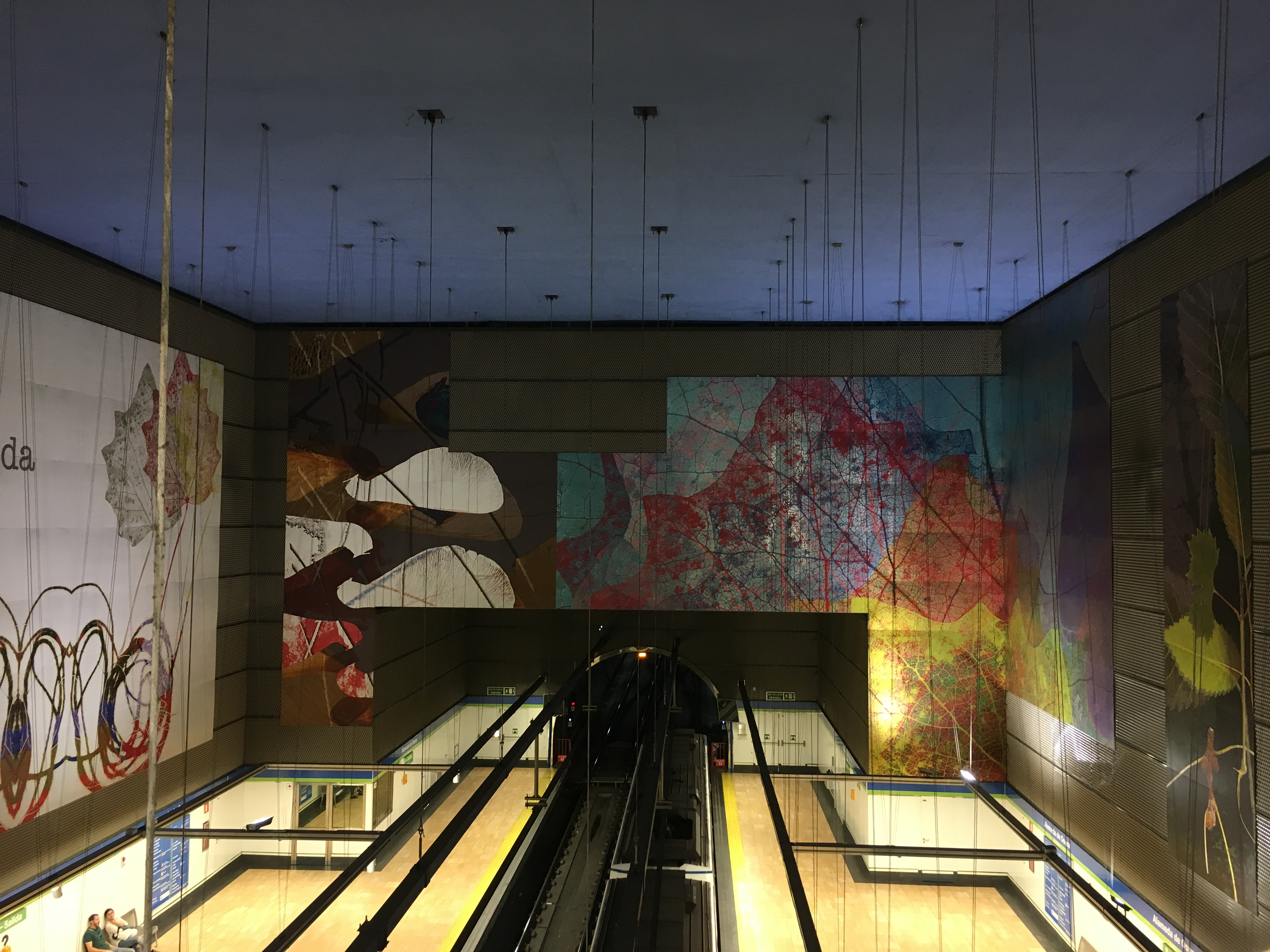

General information
- Location: Barajas, Madrid; Spain
- Coordinates: 40.457792°N 3.587523°W
- System: Madrid Metro station
- Owner: CRTM
- Operator: CRTM

Construction
- Accessible: yes

Other information
- Fare zone: A

History
- Opened: 24 November 2006

Services
Preceding station	Madrid Metro	Following station
Terminus	Line 5	El Capricho towards Casa de Campo
Location
- Location within Madrid

Alameda de Osuna [alaˈmeða ðe oˈsuna] is a station on Line 5 of the Madrid Metro, located in the Alameda de Osuna barrio. It is located in fare Zone A.
