= Marshala Zhukova =

Rural locality in Kursk Oblast, Russia

Marshala Zhukova Посёлок Маршала Жукова
- Settlement
- Interactive map of Marshala Zhukova
- Location of Marshala Zhukova Marshala Zhukova (Kursk Oblast)
- Coordinates: 51°42′48″N 36°19′49″E
- Country: Russia
- Federal subject: Kursk Oblast
- Administrative district: Kursky District
- SelsovietSelsoviet: Klyukvinsky

Population (2010 Census)
  - Total: 4,715
  - Estimate (2021): 4,190 (−11.1%)

Municipal status
  - Municipal district: Kursky Municipal District
  - Rural settlement: Klyukvinsky Selsoviet Rural Settlement
- Time zone: UTC+3 (MSK)
- Postal code: 305502
- Dialing code: +7 4712
- OKTMO ID: 38620428136
- Website: klukva.rkursk.ru

Marshala Zhukova or Posyolok Marshala Zhukova (Russian: Маршала Жукова, Посёлок Маршала Жукова) is a rural locality (a settlement) in Klyukvinsky Selsoviet Rural Settlement, Kursky District, Kursk Oblast, Russia. Population: 4,190 (2021 census); 4,715 (2010 census); 4,723 (2002 census);

== Geography ==
The settlement is located 98 km from the Russia–Ukraine border, 8 km east of the district center – the town Kursk, 1.5 km from the selsoviet center – Dolgoye.

Climate

Marshala Zhukova has a warm-summer humid continental climate (Dfb in the Köppen climate classification).

Climate data for Marshala Zhukova
Month	Jan	Feb	Mar	Apr	May	Jun	Jul	Aug	Sep	Oct	Nov	Dec	Year
Mean daily maximum °C (°F)	−4.2 (24.4)	−3.2 (26.2)	2.7 (36.9)	13 (55)	19.4 (66.9)	22.7 (72.9)	25.4 (77.7)	24.7 (76.5)	18.2 (64.8)	10.5 (50.9)	3.3 (37.9)	−1.3 (29.7)	10.9 (51.7)
Daily mean °C (°F)	−6.3 (20.7)	−5.8 (21.6)	−0.9 (30.4)	8.2 (46.8)	14.7 (58.5)	18.4 (65.1)	21 (70)	20.1 (68.2)	14 (57)	7.2 (45.0)	1 (34)	−3.2 (26.2)	7.4 (45.3)
Mean daily minimum °C (°F)	−8.8 (16.2)	−8.9 (16.0)	−5 (23)	2.6 (36.7)	9 (48)	13 (55)	15.8 (60.4)	14.9 (58.8)	9.7 (49.5)	3.9 (39.0)	−1.3 (29.7)	−5.4 (22.3)	3.3 (37.9)
Average precipitation mm (inches)	51 (2.0)	44 (1.7)	47 (1.9)	50 (2.0)	60 (2.4)	68 (2.7)	70 (2.8)	55 (2.2)	59 (2.3)	59 (2.3)	46 (1.8)	48 (1.9)	657 (26)
Source: https://en.climate-data.org/asia/russian-federation/kursk-oblast/маршала-жукова-523788/

== History ==
The settlement in honor of general Georgy Zhukov was established in 1994 in the place of a cleared forest. They were built by Turkish workers and the construction took about 6 months. The locality was intended for the Russian military units withdrawn from East Germany. There are 6 residential blocks and 160 houses. The architecture of the settlement seems rather monotonous: more than 150 identical 3-, 4- and 5-storey multidwellings. In the building of the "Officers' House" there is the St. George Orthodox Church.

== Transport ==
Marshala Zhukova is located 1 km from the federal route P-298 (Kursk – Voronezh – P-22 "Kaspy" Highway; a part of the European route E38), on the road of intermunicipal significance 38H-268 (R-298 – Durnevo), 3.5 km from the nearest railway station Klyukva (railway line Klyukva — Belgorod).

The rural locality is situated 5 km from Kursk Vostochny Airport, 118 km from Belgorod International Airport and 200 km from Voronezh Peter the Great Airport.
