= Planimetría General de Madrid =

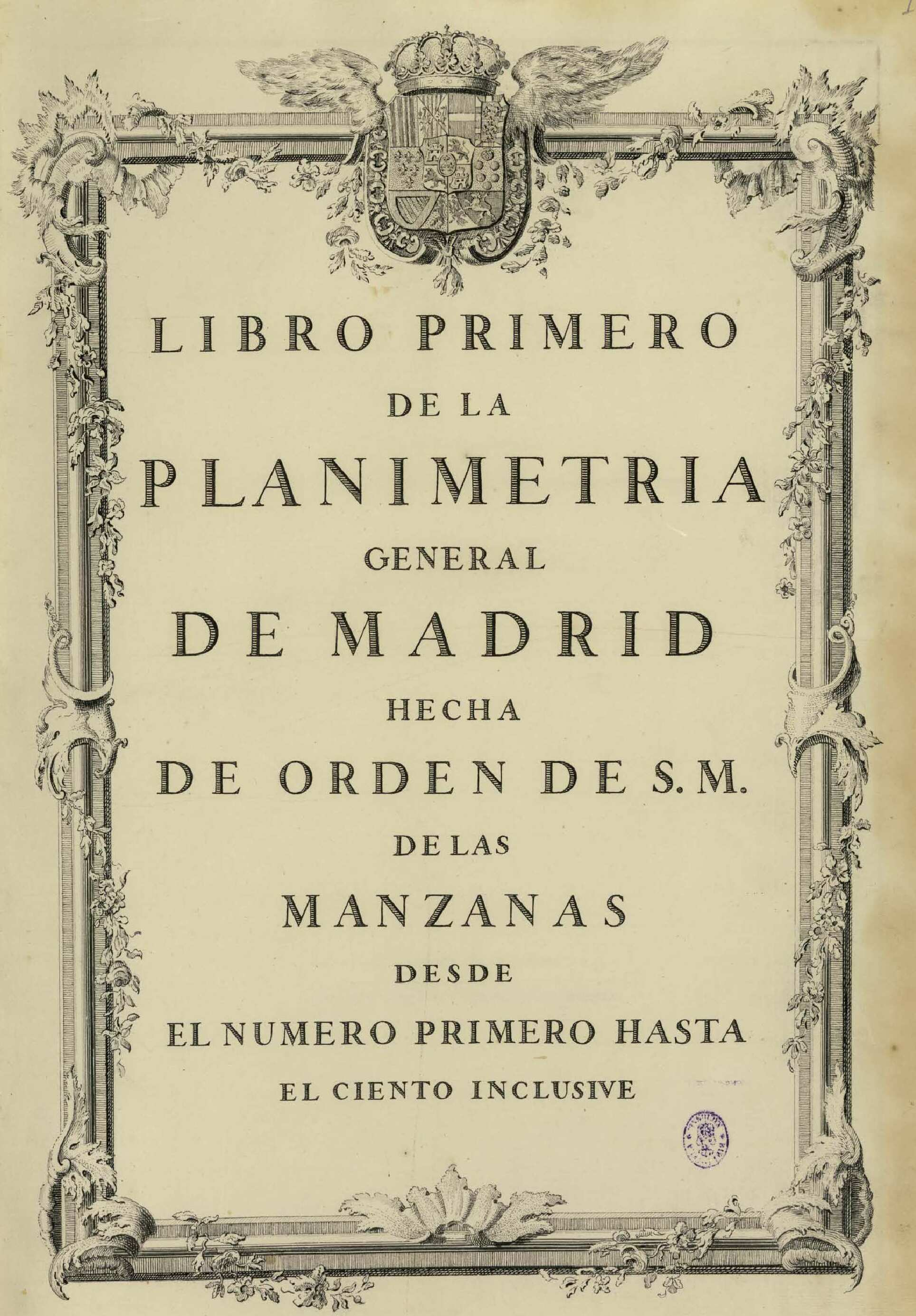
Title page from Planimetria General de Madrid

The Planimetría General de Madrid(in Spanish) (sometimes referred to as the Planimetría General de la Villa or the Visita General) or the General Survey of Madrid(in English) was a cadastral survey and registering of urban land carried out in the city of Madrid in the eighteenth century, between 1749 and 1759 The cadastre collected information related to property ownership, size and other indications, in an effort to facilitate the imposition of the regalía de aposento.

== History ==
The General Survey of Madrid between 1749 and 1774 was one of the most important cadastral surveys of the Old Spanish regime. The Planimetría General de Madrid resulted in the production 557 plans of blocks throughout Madrid.

In the cadastre documentary data were collected on the ownership of Madrid properties and other features such as previous owners, map showing the plots into which each manzana or block was divided, description of the configuration and structure of each building, size and quality of the building, indication of the name and number of tenants housed per room, the tax status according to the aposento charged, among other indicators. Each block was then numbered and identified with the objective of levying taxes. This identification done by the general visit resulted in a white tile being laid on every house with writing in blue letters indicating the number assigned: "Visita G. Casa nº123" (General Visit House # 123).

The initial intentions of the Marqués de la Ensenada was to renew the tax system in Castile. Among the constraints imposed on the inhabitants of Madrid was the regalía de aposento. The method by which taxes were imposed was based on the "Visita General" which identified the nature of property ownership and assessed the taxes on inhabitants accordingly.

The imprecision of the method resulted in it being eventually abandoned. It was repealed by Marqués Viudo de Pontejos who replaced it with a more logical which consisted of identifying streets with names of famous persons and historical events. The white numbered tiles that were laid by officials during the survey are still evidenced on the façade of Madridean houses especially in the historic center of Madrid.

== See also ==
- Casas a la malicia
- Regalía de aposento
