= Multifamily residential =

Densely populated housing development

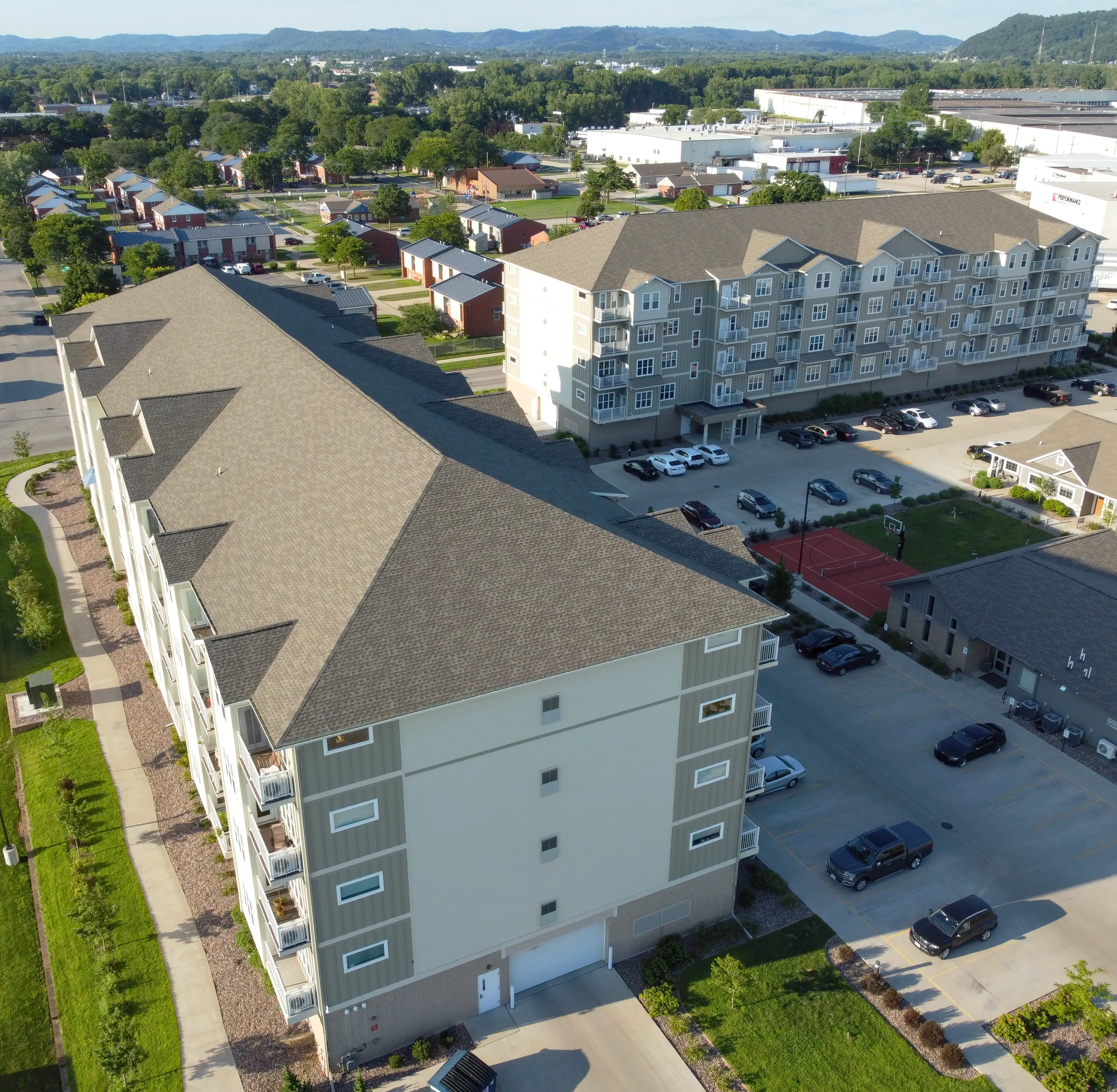
4–over–1 multi–unit housing with parking below

Multifamily residential, also known as multidwelling unit (MDU), is a classification of housing where multiple separate housing units for residential inhabitants are contained within one building or several buildings within one complex. Units can be next to each other (side-by-side units), or stacked on top of each other (top and bottom units). Common forms include apartment building and condominium, where typically the units are owned individually rather than leased from a single building owner. Many intentional communities incorporate multifamily residences, such as in cohousing projects.

Housing units in multifamily housing have greater per capita value than single family homes. Multifamily housing has beneficial fiscal externalities, as their presence reduces property tax rates in the community. Contrary to some popular discourse, in particular from NIMBYs, multifamily housing are a lower fire hazard.

Multifamily housing has historically prompted considerable political controversy. In some countries, such as the United States, zoning laws extensively set land aside for detached single-family homes and prohibit multifamily housing. Affluent homeowners have been described as particularly likely to oppose multifamily housing. Historically, efforts to ban multifamily housing were driven by efforts to keep racial minorities and poor people out of neighborhoods.

== History ==
Before the Industrial Revolution, such examples were rare, existing only in historical urban centers. In Ancient Rome, these were called insulae, skyscrapers in Shibam, malice houses in Madrid, and casbah in the Casbah of Algiers.

== Examples ==
- Apartment building or block of flats – a building with multiple apartments. There can be multiple apartments on each floor and there are often multiple floors. Apartment buildings can range in many sizes, some with only a few apartments, other with hundreds of apartments on many floors, or any size in between. There are often inside hallways and inside entrances to each apartment, but outside entrances to each apartment are also possible. An apartment building can be owned by one party and each of the apartments rented to tenants or each of the apartments can be owned as a condominium by separate parties.
- Mixed-use building – a building with space for both commercial, business, or office use, and space for residential use. Possible arrangements include the commercial/business use on the first or first couple floors and one or more apartments or residential spaces on the upper floors. Another possibility is to have the commercial/business area up front and the residential area in the back. Some or maybe all of the space may be used by the owner or some or all the business and residential units may be leased by the owner. Condominium ownership is also possible.
- Apartment community – a collection of apartment buildings on adjoining pieces of land, generally owned by one entity. The buildings often share common grounds and amenities, such as pools, parking areas, and a community clubhouse, used as leasing offices for the community.
- Brownstone: a New York City term for a rowhouse: see rowhouse.
- Bedsit: a British expression (short for bed-sitting room) for a single-roomed dwelling in a sub-divided larger house. The standard type contains a kitchenette or basic cooking facilities in a combined bedroom/living area, with a separate bathroom and lavatory shared between a number of rooms. Once common in older Victorian properties in British cities, they are less frequently found since the 1980s as a result of tenancy reforms, property prices and renovation grants that favour the refurbishment of such properties into self-contained flats for leasehold sale.
- Close: Term used in Glasgow for high-density slum housing built 1800–1870. Tenements usually 3 or 4 stories, terraced, back-to-back, around a short cul-de-sac.
- Cluster house: an older form of the Q-type house (see below)
- Condominium: a form of ownership with individual apartments for everyone, and co-ownership (by percentages) of all of the common areas, such as corridors, hallways, stairways, lobbies, recreation rooms, porches, rooftops, and any outdoor areas of the grounds of the buildings. Townhouses and apartments which are owned in the condominium form of ownership are often referred to as "condominiums" or "condos".
- Court: high-density slum housing built in the UK, 1800–1870. Two or more stories, terraced, back-to-back, around a short alley at right angles to the main street. Once common in cities like Liverpool and Leeds.
- Deck access: a block of "flats" which are accessed from a walkway that is open to the elements.
- Dingbat (apartment building style)
- Duplex (American English), Two-flat (British English) – a building commonly built on an edgeyard lot, consisting either of two residences, one to a storey, or a pair of semi-detached dwellings of one or several stories each. Common spaces shared by both residences may include a basement, foyer, stairwell, or porch.
- Flat: In Great Britain and parts of Ireland, this means exactly the same as an "apartment". In and around San Francisco, CA, this term means an apartment that takes up an entire floor of a large house, usually one that has been converted from an older Victorian house. In Ireland, the use of the term "flat" generally implies an apartment that is smaller or of lesser value, while the term apartment is used for larger privately owned dwellings.
- 2-Flat, 3-Flat, and 4-Flat houses: houses or buildings with 2, 3, or 4 flats, respectively, especially when each of the flats takes up one entire floor of the house. There is a common stairway in the front and often in the back providing access to all the flats. 2-Flats and sometimes 3-flats are common in certain older neighborhoods.
- Four Plus One: an apartment building consisting of four stories above a parking lot. The four floors containing the apartment units are of wood-frame and masonry construction. It was particularly popular in Chicago during the 1960s and 1970s, especially on the city's north side.
- Garage-apartment: an apartment over a garage; if the garage is attached, the apartment will have a separate entrance from the main house.
- Garlow: a portmanteau word "garage" + "bungalow"; similar to a garage-apartment, but with the apartment and garage at the same level.
- Garden apartment: a building style usually characterized by two-story, semi-detached buildings, each floor being a separate apartment.
- Garden flat: a flat which is at garden (ground) level in a multilevel house or apartment building, especially in the case of Georgian and Victorian terraced housing which has been sub-divided into separate dwellings.
- Housing cooperative (or Co-op): a form of ownership in which a non-profit corporation owns the entire apartment building or development and residents own shares in the corporation that correspond to their apartment and a percentage of common areas. In Australia this corresponds with a "company title" apartment.
- Loft or warehouse conversion can be an apartment building wherein part of the unit, usually consisting of the bedroom(s) and/or a second bedroom level bath is sub-divided vertically within the structurally tall bay between the structural floors of a former factory or warehouse building. The lofts created in such are locally supported by columns and bearing walls and not part of the overall original load bearing structure.
- Maisonette: an apartment / flat on two levels with internal stairs, or which has its own entrance at street level.
- Mess: a building or flat with single bedroom per tenant and shared facilities like toilets and kitchens. These are popular with students, bachelors or low wage earners in the Indian subcontinent. It is similar to the bedsit in the UK. Some variants include multiple tenants per bedroom and inclusion of a centralized maid service or cooked meals with tenancy.
- Mother-in-law apartment: small apartment either at the back, in the basement, or on an upper level subdivision of the main house, usually with a separate entrance (also known as a "Granny flat" in the UK, Australia New Zealand and South Africa). If it is a separate structure from the main house, it is called a 'granny cottage' or a 'doddy house'. Such Secondary suites are often efficiency or two room apartments but always have kitchen facilities (which is usually a legal requirement of any apartment).
- Microapartment: rather common in the same countries where microhouses (above) are popular. These small single-room dwellings contain a kitchen, a bathroom, a sleeping area, etc., in one place, usually in a multistorey building.
- Officetel: small apartment providing a combined work and living area in one place, especially in South Korea.
- One-plus-five: a mid-rise apartment or condominium building consisting of four or five wood-framed floors above a concrete podium. This type of construction exploded in popularity in North American cities in the 2010s.
- Penthouse: the top floor of multistory building
- Plattenbau (East German) / Panelák (Czech, Slovak): a communist-era tower block that is made of slabs of concrete put together.
- Q-type: townhouse built mainly in housing estates in the UK beginning in the late 20th century. The houses are arranged in blocks of four with each house at a corner of the block. Similar to the earlier cluster house (see above).
- Railroad apartment (or railroad flat): a type of apartment in which rooms are directly linked, without hallway separation, similar to a line of railroad cars.
- Rooming house: a type of single-room occupancy building where most washing, kitchen and laundry facilities are shared between residents, which may also share a common suite of living rooms and dining room, with or without board arrangements. When board is provided (no longer common), a common dining time and schedule is imposed by the landlord who in such cases also serves as an innkeeper of sorts. In Australia and the United States, any housing accommodation with 4 or more bedrooms can be regarded as a rooming house if each bedroom is subject to individual tenancy agreements. In the U.S., rooming house lease agreements typically run for very short periods, usually week to week, or a few days at a time. Transient housing arrangements for longer term tenancies are implemented by a "rider" on a case-by-case basis, if local laws permit.
- Rowhouse (USA); also called "terraced home" (USA); also called "Townhouse": 3 or more houses in a row sharing a "party" wall with its adjacent neighbour. In New York City, "Brownstones" are rowhouses. Rowhouses are typically multiple stories. The term townhouse is currently coming into wider use in the UK, but terraced house (not "terraced home") is more common.
- Shophouse: the name given in Southeast Asia to a terraced two to five story urban building featuring a shop or other public activity on the street level, with residential accommodation on upper floors.
- Single-room occupancy or SRO: a studio apartment, usually occurring with a block of many similar apartments, intended for use as public housing. They may or may not have their own washing, laundry, and kitchen facilities. In the United States, lack of kitchen facilities prevents use of the term "apartment", so such would be classified as a boarding house or hotel.
- Six-pack: in New England (USA), this refers to a stick-built block of 6 apartments comprising (duplexed) two three story Triple deckers built side by side sharing one wall, a common roof, lot, yards (lawns and gardens, if any), parking arrangements, and basement, but possessing separately metered electric, and separate hot water and heating or air conditioning. In Australia, it refers to a style of apartments that were constructed during the 1960s, 70s and early 80s, usually comprising a single, masonry-built block containing 4 to 8 walk-up apartments (though sometimes, many more), of between 2 and 3 stories in height, with car parking at the side or rear.
- Semi-detached – one building consisting of two separate "houses", typically side by side, each with separate entrances and typically without common inside areas. Each of the two houses typically has separate owners.

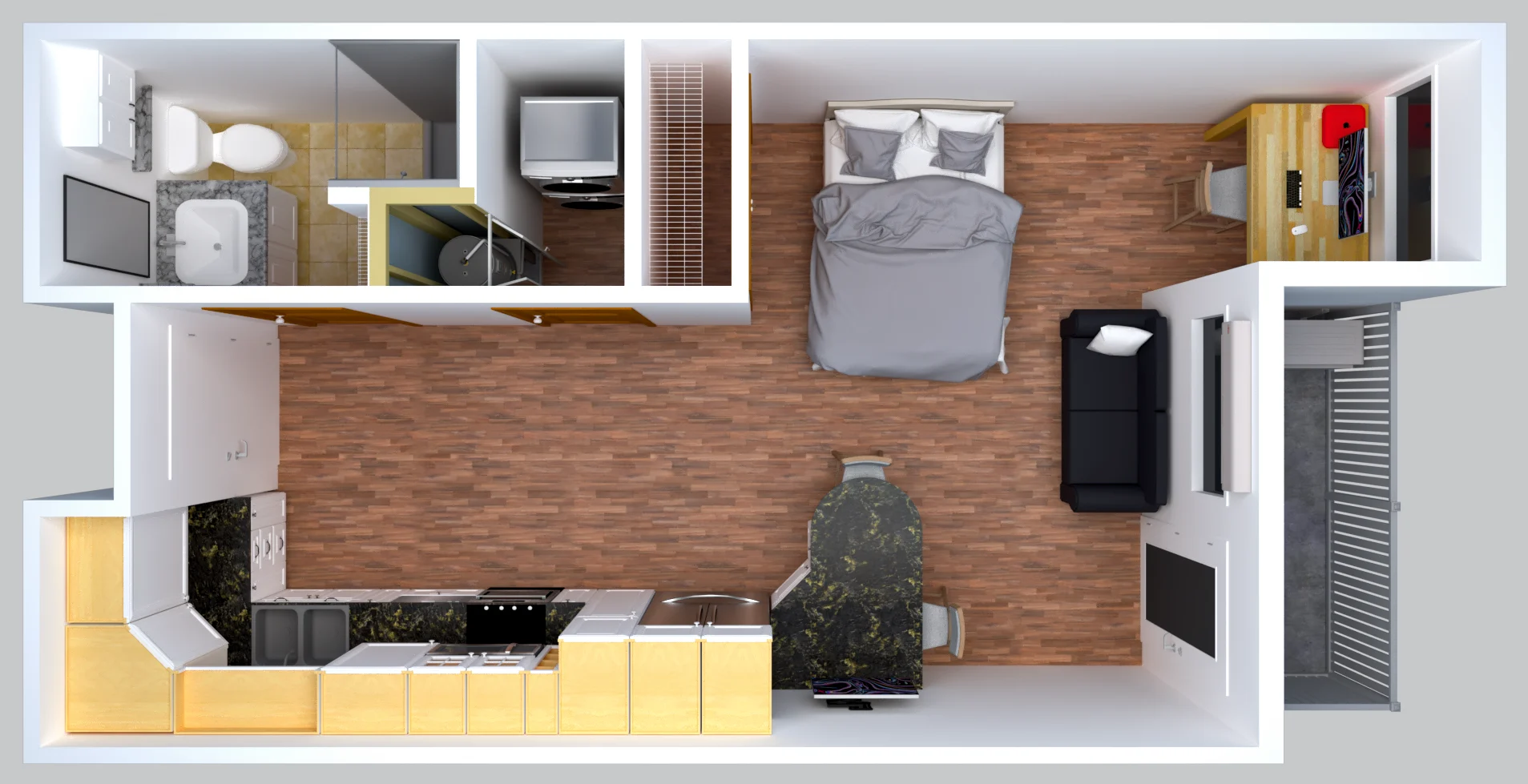
Studio apartment layout. One main living area with no separate bedroom.

- Studio apartment or Studio flat (UK), or Bachelor apartment or Efficiency apartment: a suite with a single room that doubles as living/sitting room and bedroom, with a kitchenette and bath squeezed in off to one side. The unit is designed for a single occupant or possibly a couple. Especially in Canada and South Africa, also called bachelor, or bachelorette if very small.
- Tenement: a multiunit dwelling usually of frame construction, quite often brick veneered, made up of several (generally many more than four to six) apartments (i.e. a large apartment building) that can be up to five stories. Tenements do not generally have elevators. In the United States, the connotation sometimes implies a run-down or poorly cared-for building. It often refers to a very large apartment building usually constructed during the late 19th to early 20th-century era sited in cities or company towns.

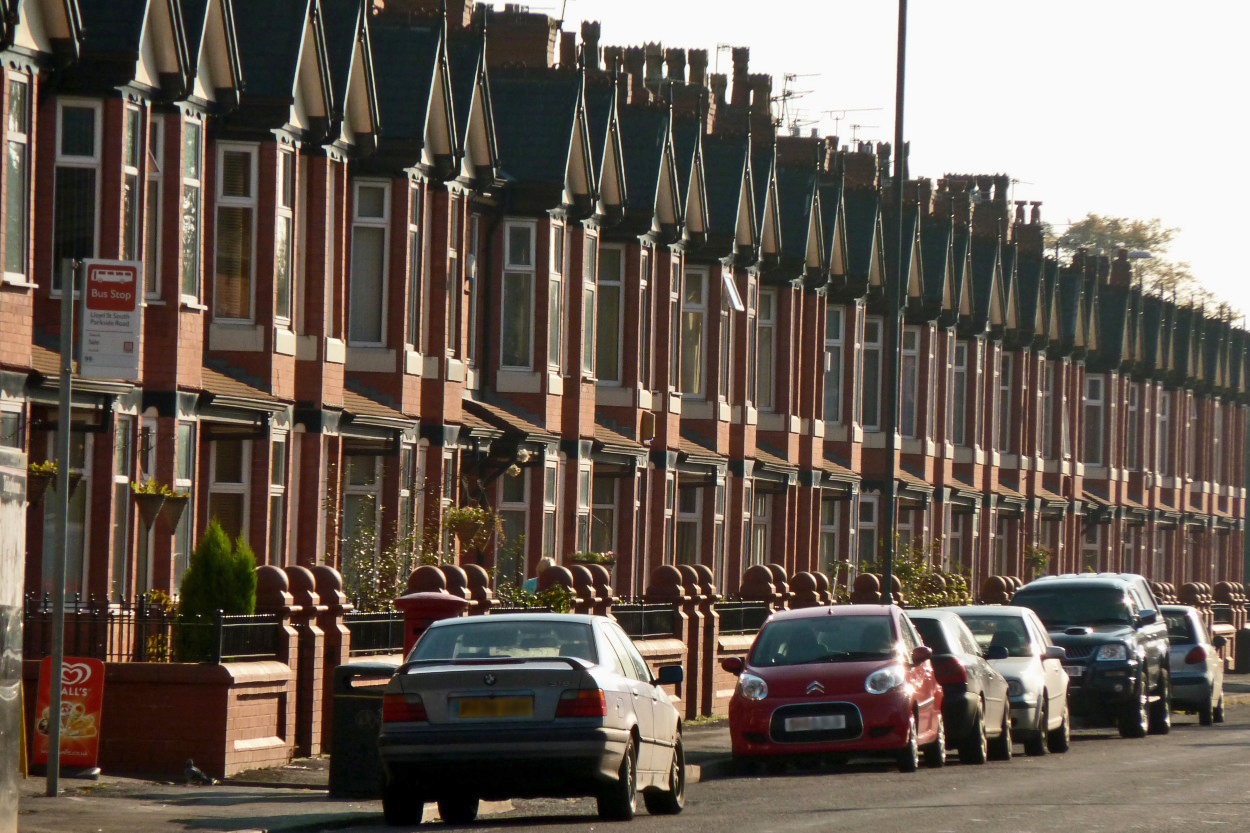
Example of late Victorian terrace in Moss Side, Manchester, UK.

- Terraced house: since the late 18th century is a style of housing where (generally) identical individual houses are conjoined into rows – a line of houses which abut directly onto each other built with shared party walls between dwellings whose uniform fronts and uniform height created an ensemble that was more stylish than a "rowhouse". However, this is also the UK term for a "rowhouse" regardless of whether the houses are identical or not.
  - Back-to-back: terraced houses which also adjoin a second terrace to the rear. They were a common form of housing for workers during the Industrial Revolution in England.
- Tower block or Apartment tower: a high-rise apartment building.
- Townhouse: also called Rowhouse (US). In the UK, a townhouse is a traditional term for an upper-class house in London (in contrast with country house), and is now coming into use as a term for new terraced houses, which are often three or more stories tall and may include a garage on the ground floor.
  - Stacked townhouse: units are stacked on each other; units may be multilevel; all units have direct access from the outside.
- Three family home or Three family house: U.S. real estate and advertising term for several configurations of apartment classed dwelling buildings including:
  - Triple decker: a three-family apartment house, usually of frame construction, in which all three apartment units are stacked on top of one another. (For additional characteristics, also see Multifamily home features below.)
- Triplex (American English), Three-flat (British English) – a building similar to a duplex except there are three stories. Two-flat and possibly three-flat buildings are rather common in certain older neighborhoods in certain cities.
- Two decker: a two family house consisting of stacked apartments that frequently have similar or identical floor plans. Some two deckers, usually ones starting as single-family homes, have one or both floors sub-divided and are therefore three or four-family dwellings. Some have external stairways giving a totally separate entrance, and some, usually those which have been a single-family house now sub-divided, are similar to the Maisonette plan but sharing a common external 'main entrance' door and lock, and a main internal hall with stairways letting to the separate apartments. (For additional characteristics, also see Multifamily home features below.)
- Tyneside flat: a pair of single-storey flats in a two-storey terrace, distinctively with two separate front doors to the street rather than a shared lobby. Notably found on Tyneside, North Eastern England.
- Quadplex (American English), Four-flat (British English) – a building similar to a three-flat except there are four flats. In some cases, the arrangement of apartments may be different and the lot size may be larger than that of a regular house.
- Tong Lau(唐樓 / 騎樓): a type of shophouse found in southern China and old parts of Hong Kong. It has shops on the first floor, no basement, no garage and about 3-4 floors. It had to be short for the Tong Laus in Hong Kong is very close to the old Kai Tak airport, but it is now a cruise terminal and newer and higher buildings have sprung up there. The government has also been destroying the old Tong Laus and rebuilding.
- "Toothpick Apartments": a type of apartment about 10-20 stories high and usually has one flat on each story. It is very thin, and surrounded by many other shorter buildings (Tong Lau), therefore nicknamed "Toothpick Apartments". They exist in Hong Kong, and are mostly private apartments. They have about 1-3 levels of car parks.
- Unit: a type of Medium-density housing found in Australia and New Zealand.
- Vatara: a housing complex, mainly found in urban Karnataka, India, similar to an apartment complex, but with mostly two stories and homes in a row on each floor.

== See also ==
- Cohousing
