= Lefranc =

Lefranc or LeFranc is a surname. Notable people with the surname include:

- Christelle Lefranc (born 1980), French fashion model
- Élie Lefranc (1932–2025), French racing cyclist
- Gérard Lefranc (1935–2025), French fencer
- Jean Georges Lefranc de Pompignan (1715–1790), French clergyman, brother of Jean-Jacques
- Jean-Jacques Lefranc, Marquis de Pompignan (1709–1784), French jurist, man of letters and gardener
- Jean-Marc Lefranc (born 1947), French politician
- Lauren LeFranc, American television writer and producer
- Victor Lefranc (1809–1883), French lawyer and politician, Minister of Agriculture and Trade, then Interior Minister
