= Carlos María de Castro =

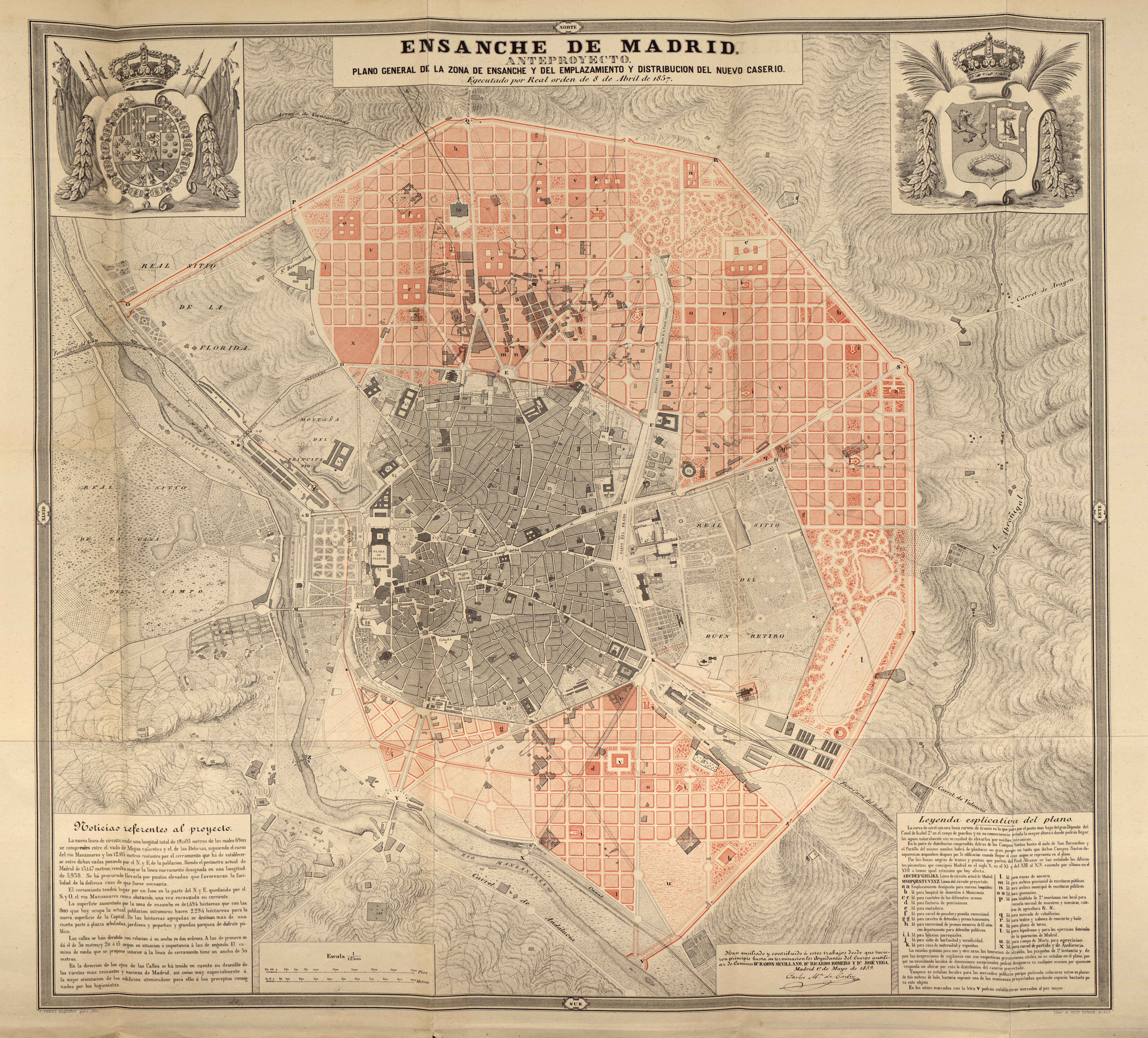
Expansion plan of Madrid, 1860

Carlos María de Castro (Estepa, 24 September 1810 - 2 November 1893) was a Spanish architect, engineer and urban planner. He created the plan of the urban expansion (Ensanche) of Madrid. The New Plan of Madrid was commissioned in 1857 and adopted in 1860. It was inspired by some technical aspects of Ildefons Cerdà's early studies and plans for the extension of Barcelona. But unlike Cerdà who sought to avoid social segregation, Castro proposed functional and social zoning.
