= Regalía de aposento =

The Regalía de aposento was a fee or royalty on housing that was instituted by the Crown of Castile in the Middle Ages.

== Characteristics ==
Of medieval origin, the regalía de aposento consisted of a requirement to cede half of one's home to temporarily accommodate royal officials. In the Middle Ages and at the beginning of the Modern Age, when the Castilian Court became an itinerant court, this tax was generally brief, imposed on a given population and effective only during the time that the king and the court occupied the area. When Philip II decided to establish the Court in Madrid in 1561, the housing fee was exclusively supported by locals.

Contrary to what may be believed, and unlike the previous Regalía de Aposento, this royalty was not imposed by force. Rather, the Madrid authorities, representatives of the local bourgeoisie, agreed on this charge, not royalty, with the King in exchange for the advantages of being the capital of an important empire. Its organization was based on the Junta de Aposentadores, created by Alfonso XI in 1341 and the aposentadores de caminos (road royalties), which regularly visited places where the Court resided. From 1621 the institution was named Junta de Aposento.

=== Room charge ===
The status of buildings in Madrid regarding the room charge ended up being very varied, due to the passage of time and the complexity of the royal treasury. Homes were categorized under one of the following headings:

- Houses subject to the aforementioned aposento, were bound to the original charge: owners had to cede half the floor space of their homes.
- Houses that, although in principle should have been subject to the charge, were exempted from it, either because their size or structure did not allow the distribution of space required to house the host (houses of uncomfortable partition) or because they did not meet the minimum requirements under the by-laws for this purpose. Many of these houses were built expressly with those characteristics, and thus called casas a la malicia. In such cases the aposento was replaced by a monetary charge, estimated between a third and half of the estimated value of the possible rental income. Unable to pay such amounts, some homes ended up being expropriated and administered by the Junta, or agreements were reached with the owners, who yielded one house and kept another without charges.
- There were others, called privileged houses, which meant that owners had no obligation to accommodate the royal officials, by purchase of the exemption or by royal donation.

== Enforcement ==
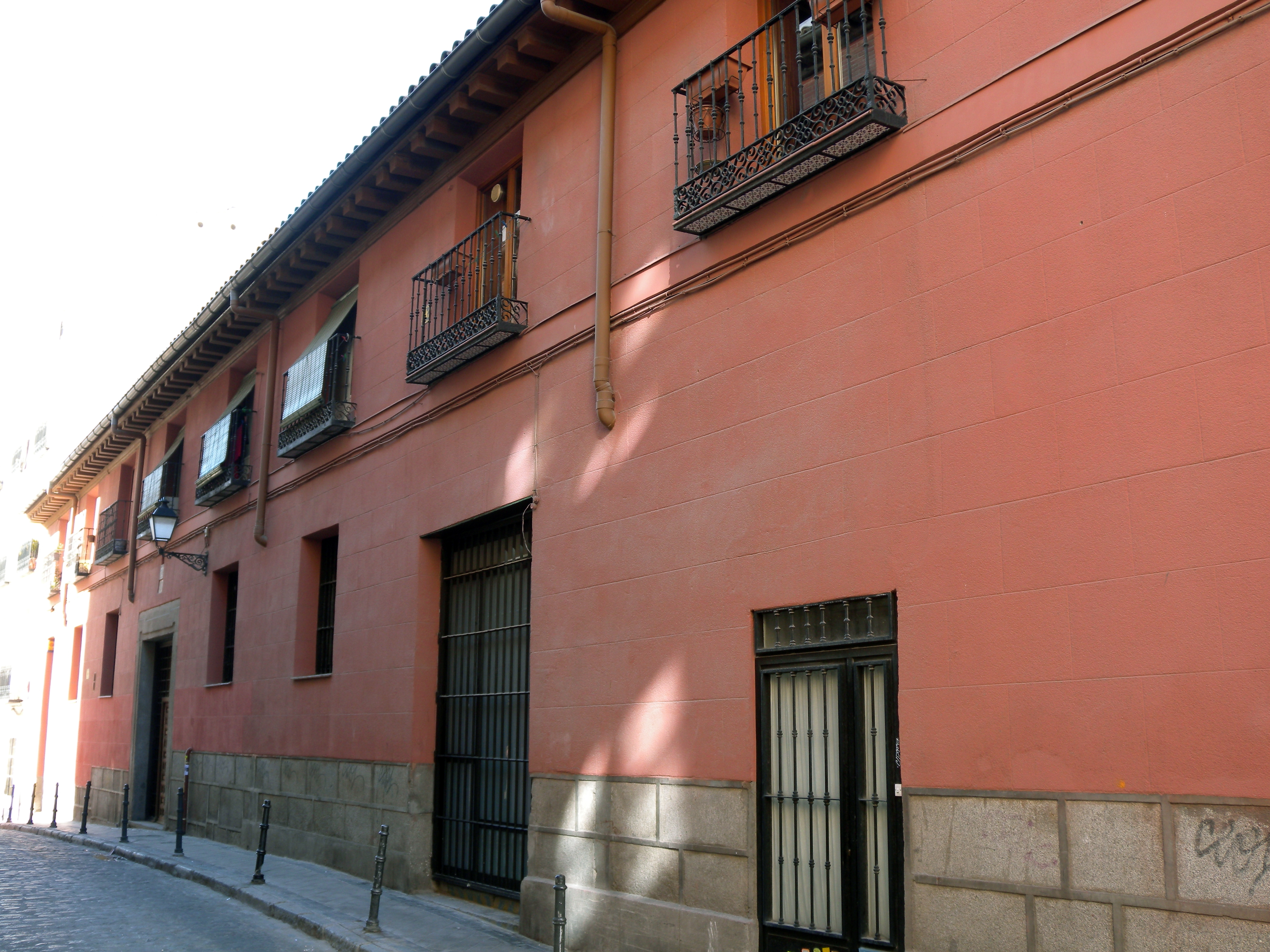
Numbered tile on Casa a la malicia in Barrio de La Latina, Madrid.

The ignorance of the Royal Treasury officials regarding the status of many properties prevented effective enforcement of the charges. The rapid population growth experienced by the city (from 2,500 homes in 1561 quadrupling to 10,000 in 1618) and the ingenuity of the constructors of casas a la malicia resulted in the urban area becoming very compact by construction in interior and interstitial (gardens, patios, yards, alleys ...) spaces - certain buildings expanded their surface by the demolition of other preexisting ones or by addition of adjacent ones and others were reduced by compartmentalization - contributed to this problem.

To improve the fairness of the tax, officials usually visited houses in the city in which anomalies were detected. The numbered tiles that were placed on houses as a consequence of that visit are still preserved on the facades of houses on the streets in the historic center of Madrid. This very ambitious effort bore fruit with the lifting of the Planimetría General de Madrid and the Cadastre of the Town and Court, between 1749 and 1759, with comprehensive documentation that attested to the need for population control, especially in the city of Madrid on the part of the bureaucracy of the Spanish monarchy. However, control was difficult, as demonstrated by the events of the 1766 (Esquilache Riots) not long after.
