= Calle de San Bernardo =

Street in Madrid, Spain

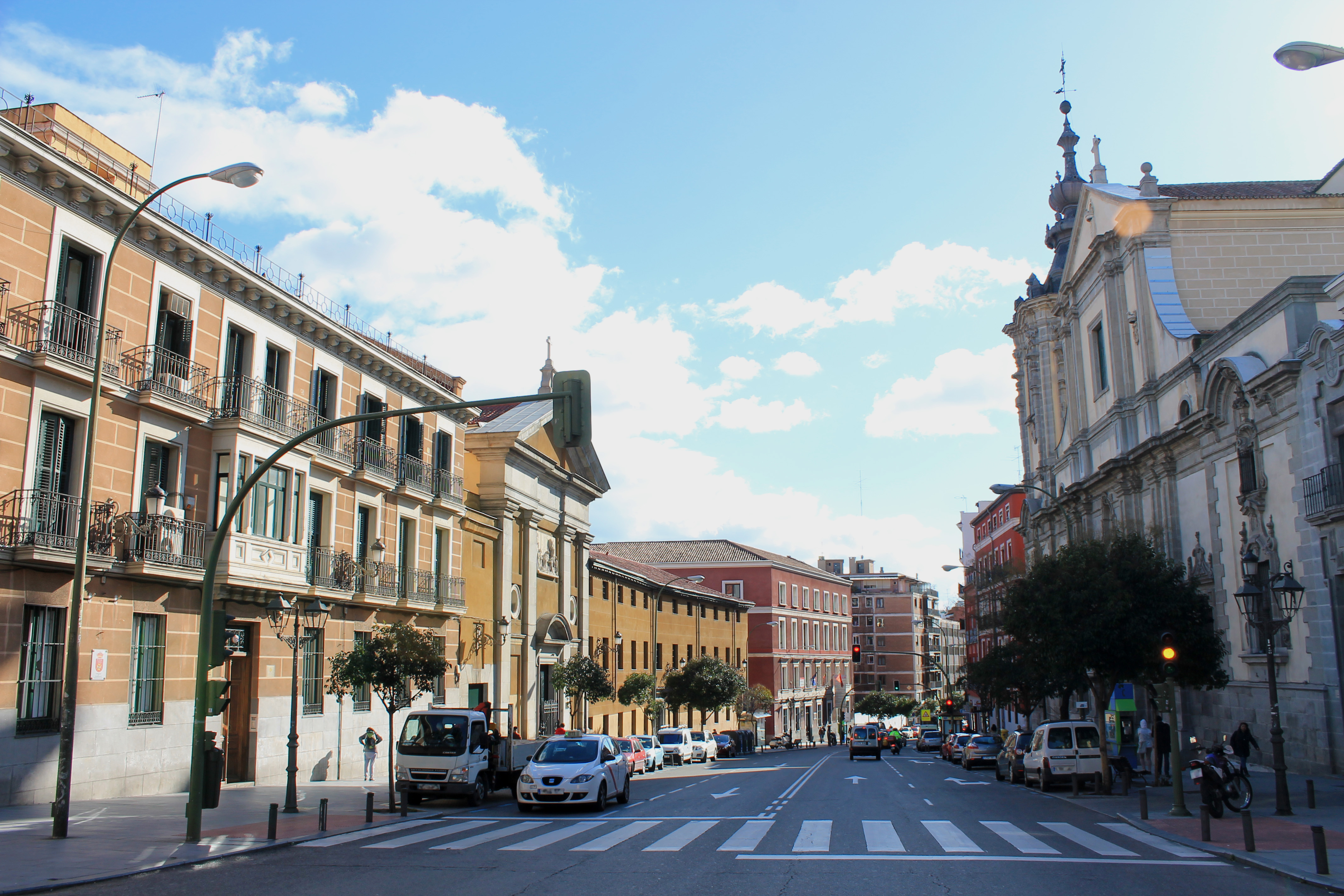
- Namesake: Bernard of Clairvaux
- Type: street
- Location: Madrid, Spain
- South end: Plaza de Santo Domingo
- Major junctions: Gran Vía
- North end: Glorieta de Quevedo

The Calle de San Bernardo is a street in central Madrid, Spain. Located in the Centro and Chamberí districts, it once was the former road in and out of the city from the North.

== History and description ==
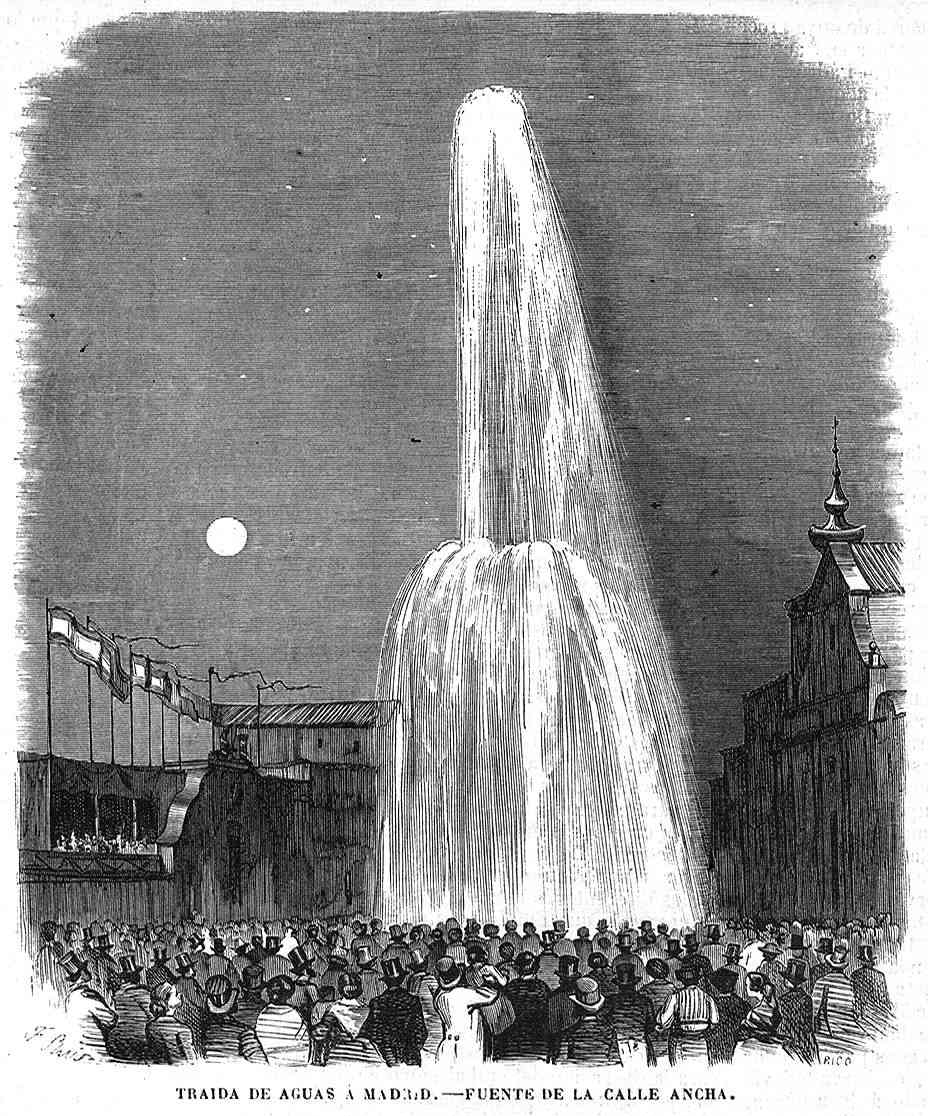
1858 unveiling of the waters of the Canal de Isabel II in front of the Church of Our Lady of Montserrat.

Ancient names include the Camino de Alcovendas, Calle de los Convalecientes de San Bernardo and Calle Ancha de San Bernardo; the latter denomination was kept until 1865. Straddling along the Palacio (the initial stretch up to the junction with the Gran Vía) and the Universidad neighborhoods part of the Centro District, the street starts at the Plaza de Santo Domingo and, going North, it enters the Chamberí district, forming the limit between the Arapiles and Trafalgar neighborhoods, ending at the Glorieta de Quevedo.

In 1858, the street was the place for the arrival of the waters of the Lozoya through the Canal de Isabel II, celebrated with a ceremony that unveiled a 30-metre high water dispenser in the middle of the street.

Some landmarks located along the street include the Palacio de la Marquesa de Sonora (seat of the Ministry of Justice), the Church of Our Lady of Montserrat, or the Palace of Bauer. During the reign of Isabella II the historic main hall of the Central University (later University of Madrid, and further in time Complutense University of Madrid) was established in the street in 1842. Following the clamp down on the 1956 university protests, the street lost some of its bustling bookstores and coffee shops.

The mashup of different architectural styles along the stretch going from the Plaza Santo Domingo to the Glorieta of Ruiz Jiménez has led to an overall lack of harmony in the street. The relentless gentrification of the Malasaña area in the 2010s led to the renovation of several traditional housing units in the street, turning them into high-end apartments.
