= Chueca =

Chueca can refer to:

- Chueca, Madrid, neighborhood in Madrid, Spain
  - its metro station, also called Chueca
- Chueca, Toledo, town in Toledo, Castilla-La Mancha, Spain
- Chueca (game), a Castilian game
- Palin (game), a Mapuche game that was called chueca by the Spanish conquistadors

Surname

- Ariadna Chueca Moreno, Spanish basketball referee
- Federico Chueca, Spanish composer
- Fernando Chueca Goitia, Spanish architect
- Natalia Chueca, Spanish politician
