= Plaza de Santo Domingo =

Plaza in Madrid, Spain

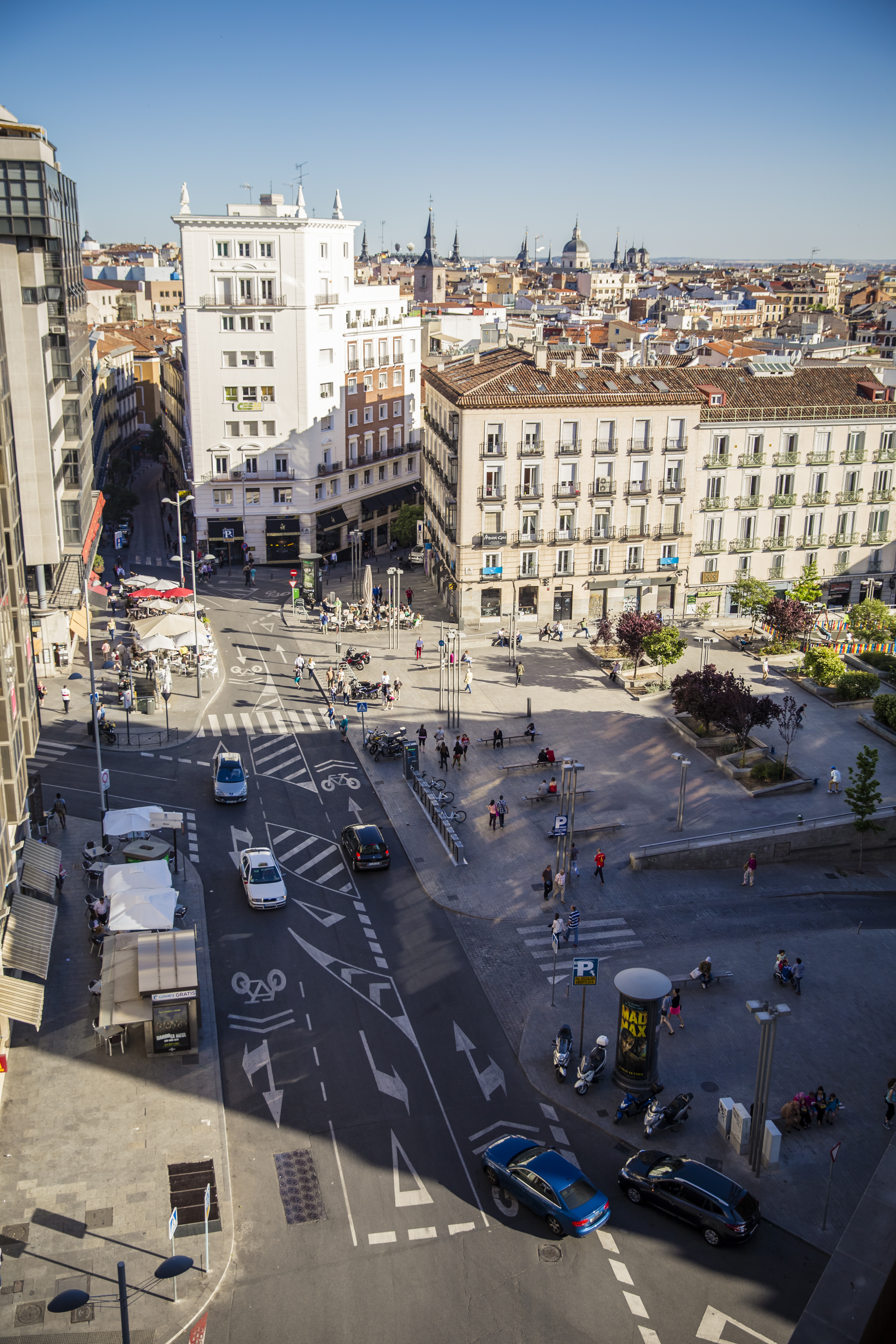
- Type: plaza
- Maintained by: Ayuntamiento of Madrid
- Location: Centro, Madrid, Spain
- Coordinates: 40.420049°N 3.708422°W
- Major junctions: Calle de San Bernardo, Calle de Preciados

The plaza de Santo Domingo is a public square in the city of Madrid, Spain.

== History and description ==
The square covers an area of 8,488 m^{2} (2.097 acres). It is located in the Palacio neighborhood, itself belonging to the Centro District.

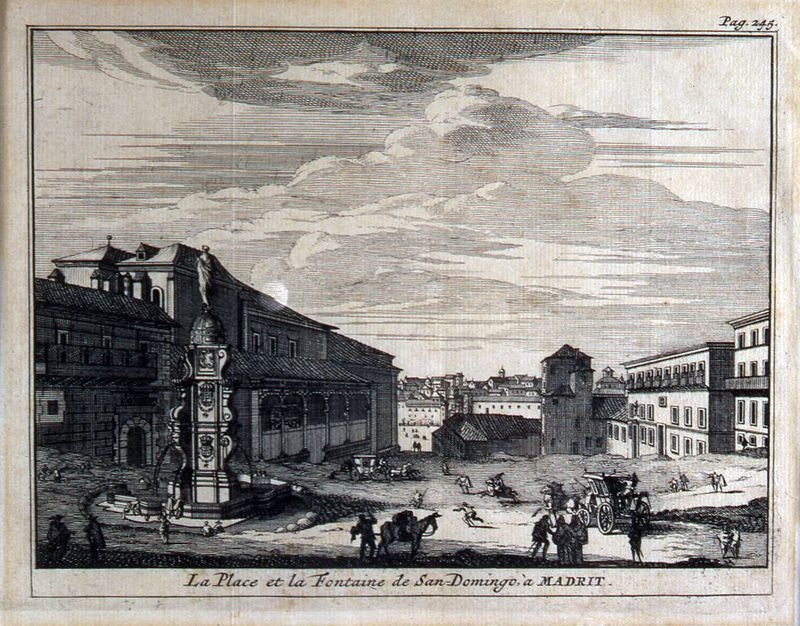
The square by the 17th century

Located in the northern end of the city by the 16th century, near the Walls of Philip II, the square became a key point for the traffic arriving to Madrid from El Pardo or from Fuencarral. The huge convent of Santo Domingo covered an area going along the cuesta de Santo Domingo, extending from the plaza de Santo Domingo to the plaza de Isabel II. The square gained its current size after the demolition of the convent during the 19th-century ecclesiastical confiscations.

In 1959, during the Francoist dictatorship, a 3-storey parking lot (the first multi-storey parking lot built in Spain) was built in the square. As the urban space degraded with the preponderance given to car, the part of the parking lot above ground was ultimately demolished in 2006. The new square, with a gardened area designed by Ágatha Ruiz de la Prada installed on the surface, was inaugurated in April 2007.
