= Sala La Riviera =

Music venue in Madrid, Spain

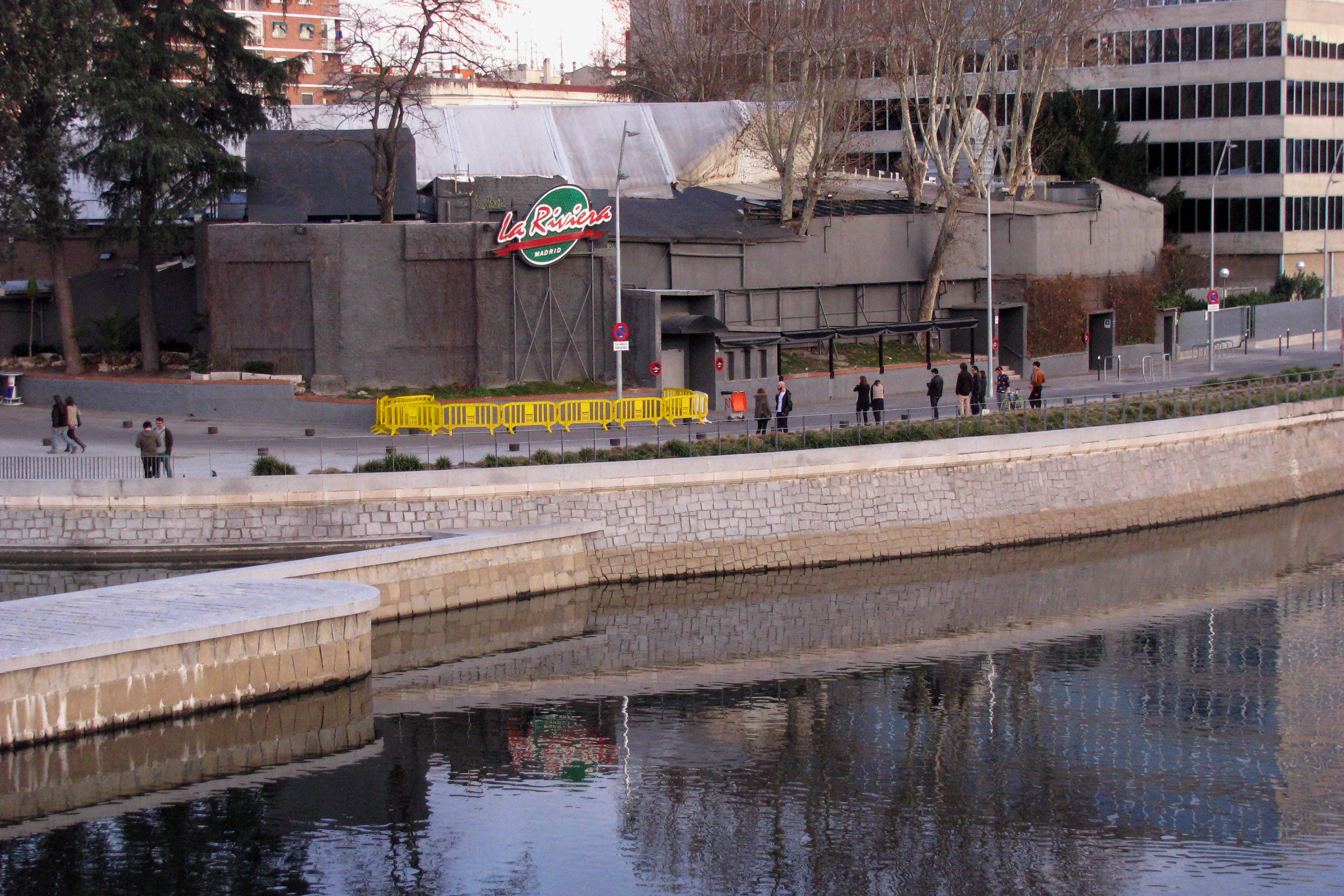
- Interactive map of Sala La Riviera
- Address: Paseo de la Virgen del Puerto, S/N, 28005 Madrid; Madrid; Spain
- Capacity: 2500

Construction
- Opened: 1958

The Sala La Riviera is an important nightclub and concert venue located in the city of Madrid, Spain.

Built in 1958, it has a capacity of 2500 people, and in the past its primary stage hosted multiple artists and both national and international groups of massive fame.

== History ==
The primary venue was installed in the La Riviera and was a cinema built in the year 1950. In 1958, the cinema was converted into a disco that became important in Madrid's nightlife. In the 1960s and 1970s, the venue was again converted into a concert hall, becoming an epicenter of music at the national level. The venue now functions as a café-bar, restaurant, and a discotheque.

The primary venue has hosted international artists such as Carlinhos Brown, Keane, Crowded House, James Blunt, Pete Doherty, James Brown, Art Garfunkel, Texas, Lou Reed, Andrés Calamaro, Garbage, Roxette, Alanis Morissette, Placebo, Morcheeba and Celia Cruz, as well as domestic artists such as Miguel Ríos, Fangoria, Tequila, Los Secretos, Ana Torroja, Héroes del Silencio, Ramoncín, Jarabe de Palo, Niña Pastori and Las Piratas.

In the 21st century, the venue functions as a discotheque and concert hall.

== Location ==
The venue is found next to the river Manzanares, at the joint of the Calle de Segovia and the Paseo de la Virgen del Puerto in the Palacio ward.

== Capacity ==
La Riviera has a total capacity of 2500 people, divided into two venues, with the primary venue having a capacity of 1500 people and the secondary venue having a capacity of 1000 people.
