= Badge of Colo-Colo =

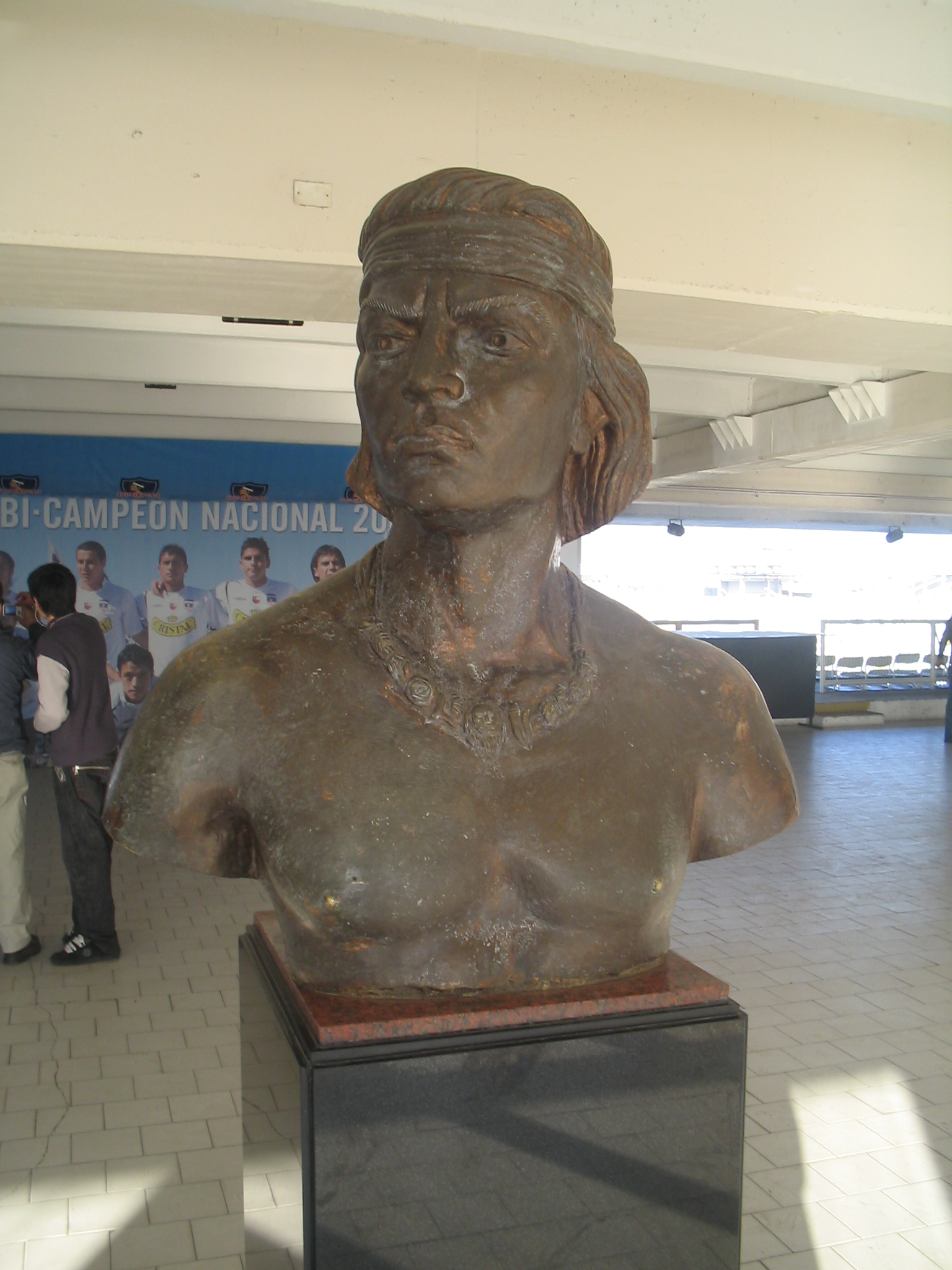
Colocolo's statue at Estadio Monumental.

The Badge of Colo-Colo represents the Mapuche chieftain Colocolo (recognized in its stadium's hall), who led the Arauco War against the Spanish Empire in 1560s. On 19 April 1925, when the Colo-Colo was established, Luis Contreras — one of the players that founded the club alongside Arellano — defined the team's badge, in representation of the chief and the country's indigenous people.

The first badge of 1925

However, the legend of Colocolo says that he was Palín champion, sport practiced by the Mapuches on both sides competing for win a thick ball of cloth. But the existence of this Araucan figure has been questioned, such as said Diego Barros Arana in its monumental text called Historia General de Chile. Contrary to this, writer Jerónimo de Vivar in one of its works, confirms their existence.

The first badge of the club featured the colors of the flag of Chile. In the 1940s the badge introduced a new design, keeping the colors of the national flag.

In 1950, the figure of a mapuche was added to the badge. It has been slightly changed up to present days.
