= Casa de Cisneros (Madrid) =

Coordinates: 40.4149°N 3.7105°W

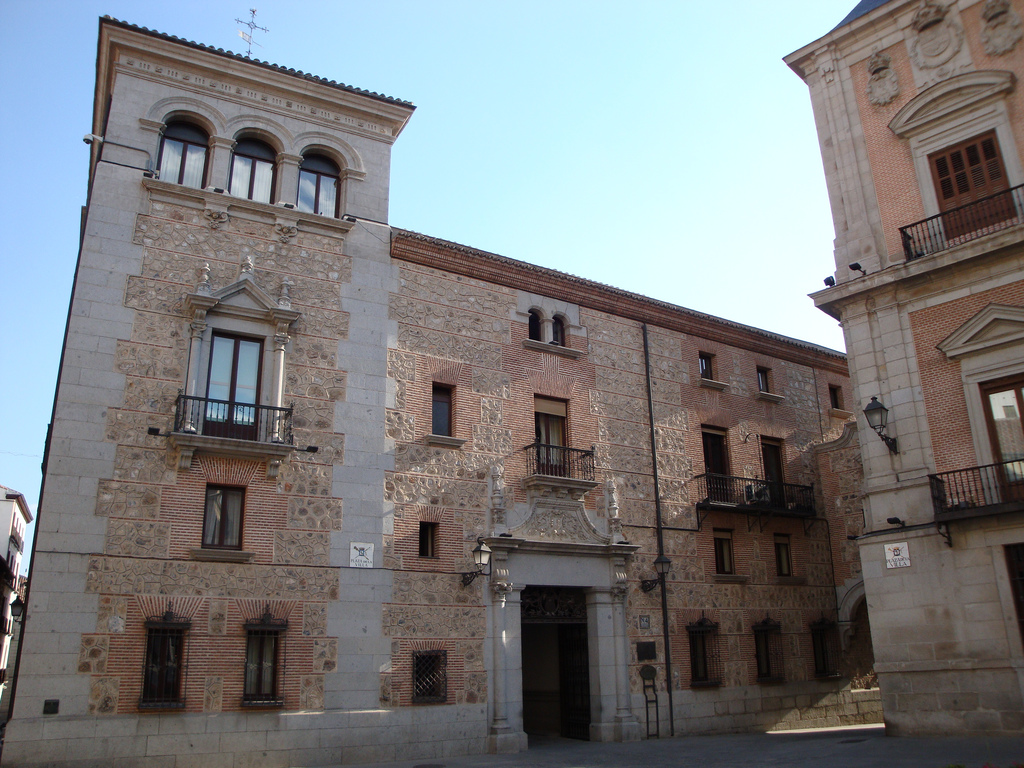
- La Casa de Cisneros in the Plaza de Villa.
- Interactive map of the Casa de Cisneros area

General information
- Type: Palace
- Architectural style: Plateresque
- Location: Plaza de la Villa, Madrid, Spain
- Opened: 1537
- Renovated: 1909

Design and construction
- Architect: Benito Jiménez de Cisneros

The Casa Cisneros is a palace located on the Plaza de la Villa in Madrid, Spain. Built in Plateresque style in 1537, at the request of Benito Jiménez de Cisneros, a 16th-century architect and nephew of Cardinal Cisneros (statesman and whose founder of founded the Complutense University), it is named in his honor.

== Features ==
The façade on the Plaza de la Villa was restored in about 1909, when the city of Madrid acquired ownership of the property and integrated it into the premises Casa de la Villa. The remodeling was done in the period 1910-1914, in line with the original plans, by the architect Antonio Bellido y Gonzánlez, who also designed the rear passageway that connects the Casa de Cisneros with the Casa de la Villa de Madrid (the old town hall).

The facade on calle Sacramento, originally the main entrance, is of the most significant historical and artistic value although somewhat modified during the 1909 renovations. According to tradition, this palace served as a prison for the controversial royal secretary to King Philip II of Spain, Antonio Perez. It is also the birthplace of Álvaro de Figueroa, 1st Count of Romanones. and General Ramón María Narváez, 1st Duke of Valencia was a famous resident who here in 1868.

== See also ==
- Madrid The main article about the modern capital city of Spain
- El Madrid de los Austrias
- Madrid capital
