= Universidad (Madrid) =

Neighborhood of Madrid in Spain

Coordinates: 40°25′31″N 3°42′30″W

- Neighborhood
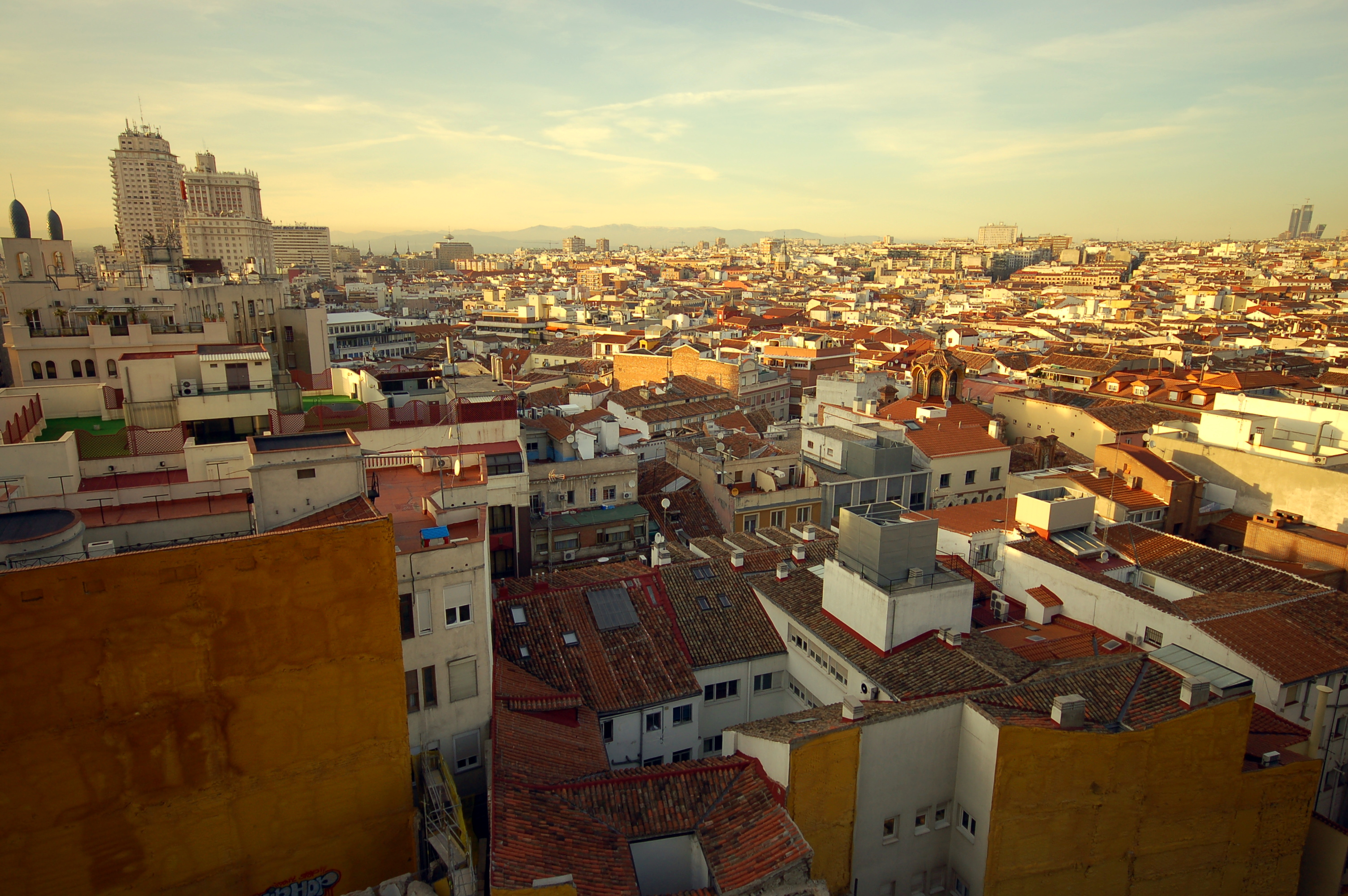
- Country: Spain
- Autonomous community: Madrid
- Municipality: Madrid
- District: Centro

Area
  - Total: 0.947641 km^{2} (0.365886 sq mi)

Population (2019)
  - Total: 32,866
  - Density: 34,682/km^{2} (89,826/sq mi)

Universidad, originally known as Barrio de Maravillas, is a neighborhood in the Centro district of Madrid. Its precise boundaries were historically defined by Calle de San Bernardo, Calle de San Vicente Ferrer, Calle de Fuencarral, and Calle de Carranza—streets that once belonged to the former Parroquia de Maravillas. Today, due to confusion with the Barrio de Universidad, its limits have been expanded to include Calle de Princesa, Gran Vía, Fuencarral, Carranza, and Alberto Aguilera.

Since the late 20th century, the area has been commonly associated with Malasaña, though there is no consensus on its exact geographical scope. However, Malasaña does not hold any official recognition. The neighborhood gets its name from the Caserón de San Bernardo, the former seat of the University of Madrid, located on Calle de San Bernardo.

It is 0.947641 km^{2} in size. As of 1 July 2019, it has a population of 32,866.

== Origin ==
Mesonero Romanos recounts in his Paseos histórico-anecdóticos the origin of the neighborhood's name, Barrio de Maravillas. According to the chronicler, it was derived from the popular name given to a Carmelite convent located between Calle de la Palma Alta and Calle de San Pedro. The convent, in turn, was named after an image of the Virgin Mary venerated in its church.

The neighborhood’s later nickname, Malasaña, emerged from the street named in 1879 after Malasaña (Juan Malasaña, father of Manuela Malasaña, who, upon learning that his daughter had been killed, chose to continue fighting against the French). Since 1961, the name has been associated with Manuela Malasaña, a young seamstress executed by Napoleonic troops during the repression following the May 2, 1808 uprising. She was accused of "carrying weapons" simply because she had a pair of sewing scissors with her when arrested. Her body was buried in the Hospital de la Buena Dicha on Calle de Silva.

== History ==
The Palacio de la Marquesa de la Sonora, now home to the Ministry of Justice, is located on Calle de San Bernardo.

Decorative tilework on the façade of the former Farmacia Juanse on Calle de San Andrés, at the corner of San Vicente Ferrer.

At the heart of the neighborhood is Plaza del Dos de Mayo, the site of the former Parque de Artillería de Monteleón, where a small military force took up arms against the Napoleonic army during the Spanish War of Independence. Under the command of captains Luis Daoíz and Pedro Velarde, they resisted the French invasion. The renovated square still preserves the arch from the old barracks, beneath which stands a monument featuring sculptures by Antonio Solá. Other nearby squares include Plaza de San Ildefonso and Plaza de Santa María de Soledad Torres Acosta (more commonly known as Plaza Luna).

== Culture ==
Like many other central areas of Madrid, the Barrio de Maravillas boasts a vibrant alternative scene and nightlife. Some commentators have likened it to Camden Town in London, the East Village in New York, Bairro Alto in Lisbon, Baixa do Porto in Porto, or Kreuzberg in Berlin.

In October 2017, along with Chueca, the neighborhood hosted Los Artistas del Barrio, an art festival where more than 200 artists showcased their work across over 70 open spaces, including venues such as La Bicicleta, Belen Artspace, Super Pop, and Enclave. Notable participants included David Trullo, Pablo Sola, Pablo Kalafaker, Carmen Alvar, Rosa Guerrero, Daniel Garbade, Nino Maza, Daniel Llull, Karma Olivié, and María Jesús Hernández.

Many films have been shot in Malasaña, including El cochecito by Marco Ferreri and Los peores años de nuestra vida by Emilio Martínez Lázaro.

Heart of the Movida Madrileña

Due to its strategic location between Chueca (later known for its LGBTQ+ culture) and Argüelles (a university district), Malasaña became a focal point of La Movida Madrileña, the countercultural movement of the 1970s and 1980s. Iconic bars with small concert spaces, such as El Penta and La Vía Láctea, became legendary meeting points.

One of the founders of La Vía Láctea, Marcos López Artiga, explained:

"When we started, there were no places like this in Madrid. We had traveled to London and Amsterdam and decided to create a space where the most marginalized people could gather. Madrid was a desert; there were about sixty people in the scene, six bars, two magazines, and four radio programs—everything was scattered. La Vía Láctea was perfect as a meeting point."

Despite multiple protests from local residents, Malasaña’s nightlife continues to attract a diverse crowd. Over the years, the demographics have shifted, ranging from young people drinking in the streets (botellón) to older university students, postgraduates, and an increasing number of foreign tourists.
