= Chueca, Madrid =

Chueca
- Ward of Madrid
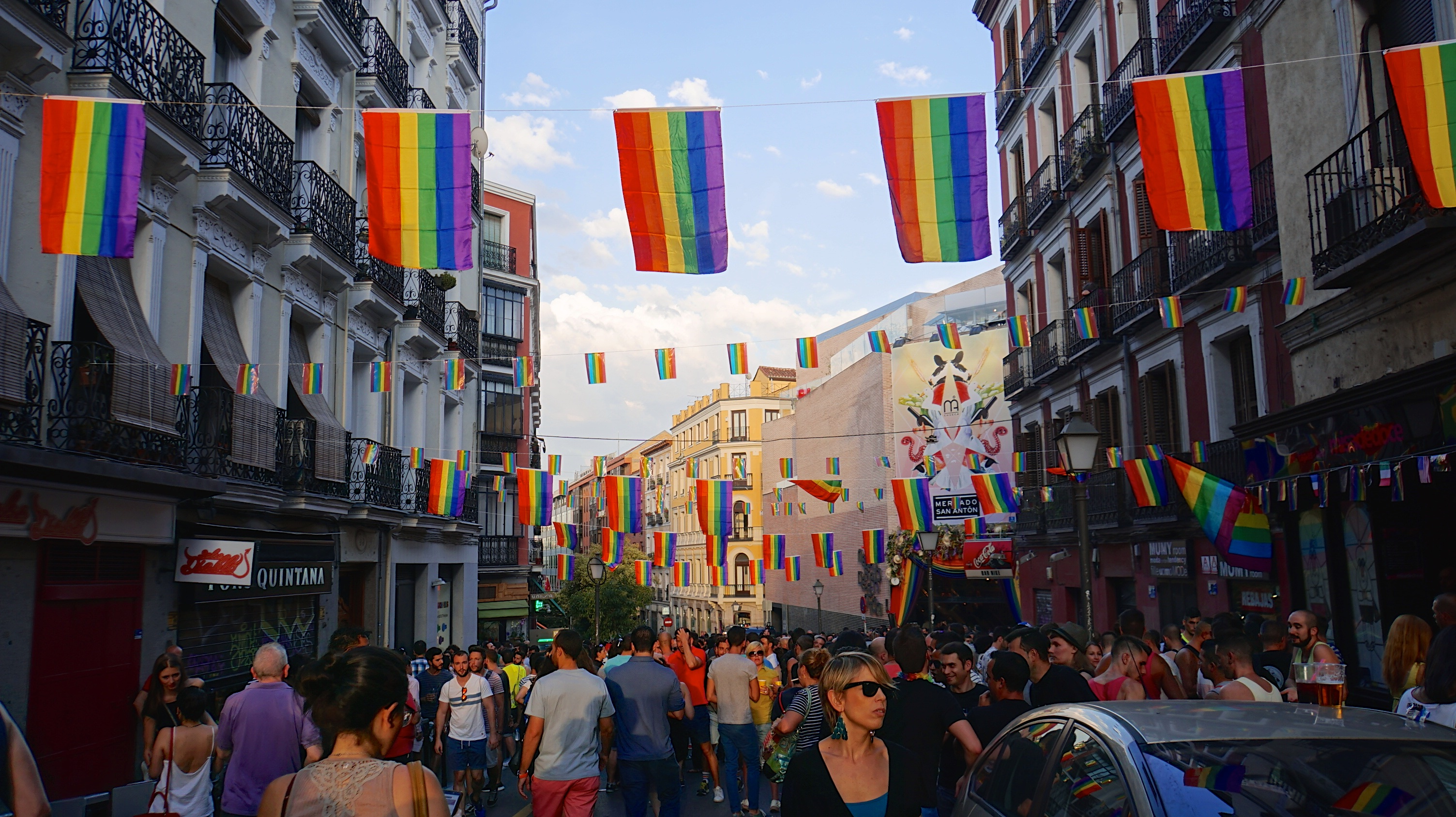
- Interactive map of Chueca
- Coordinates: 40°25′22″N 3°41′58″W
- Country: Spain
- Aut. community: Madrid
- Municipality: Madrid
- District: Centro
- Ward: Justicia

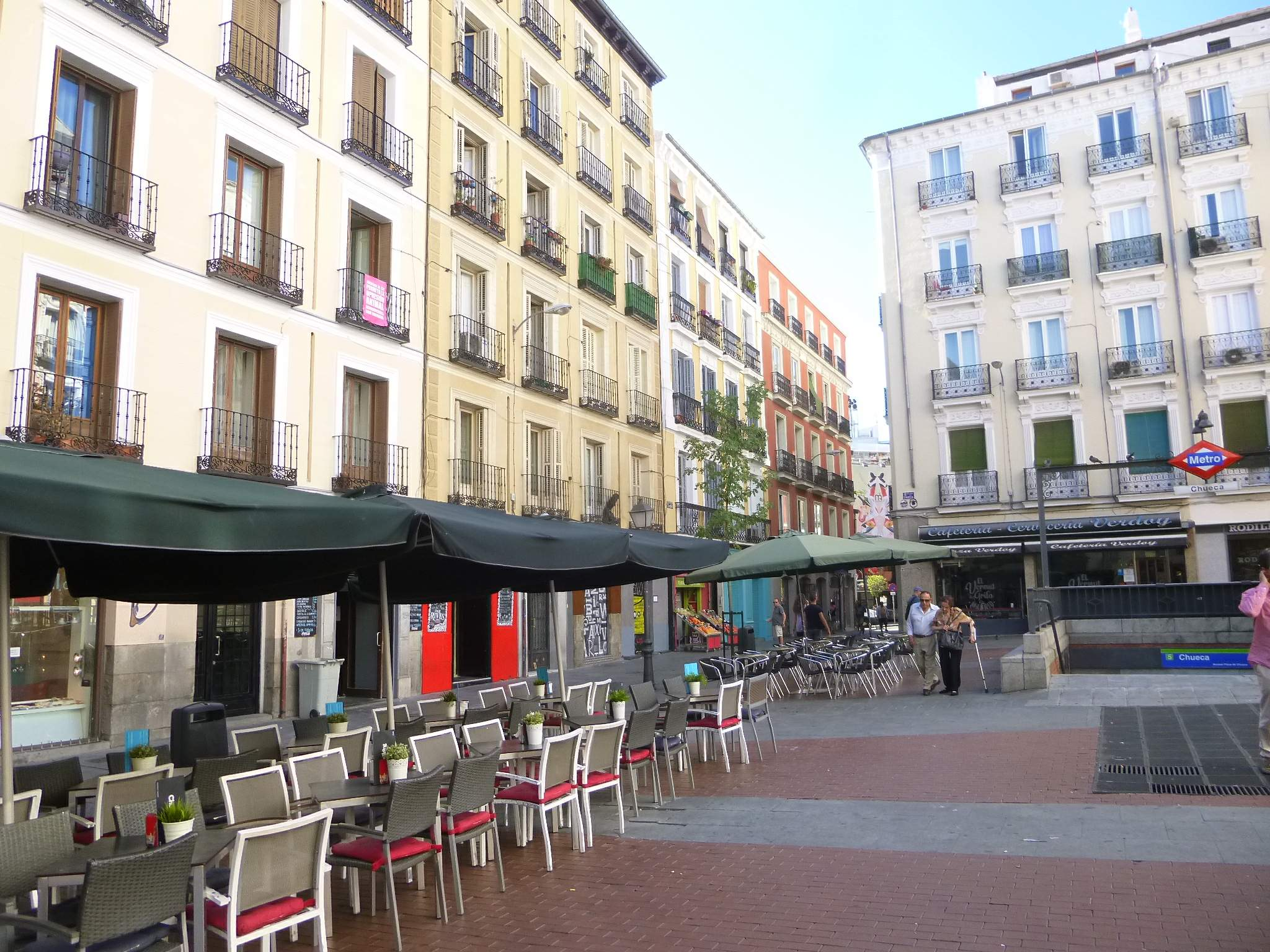
Chueca neighbourhood

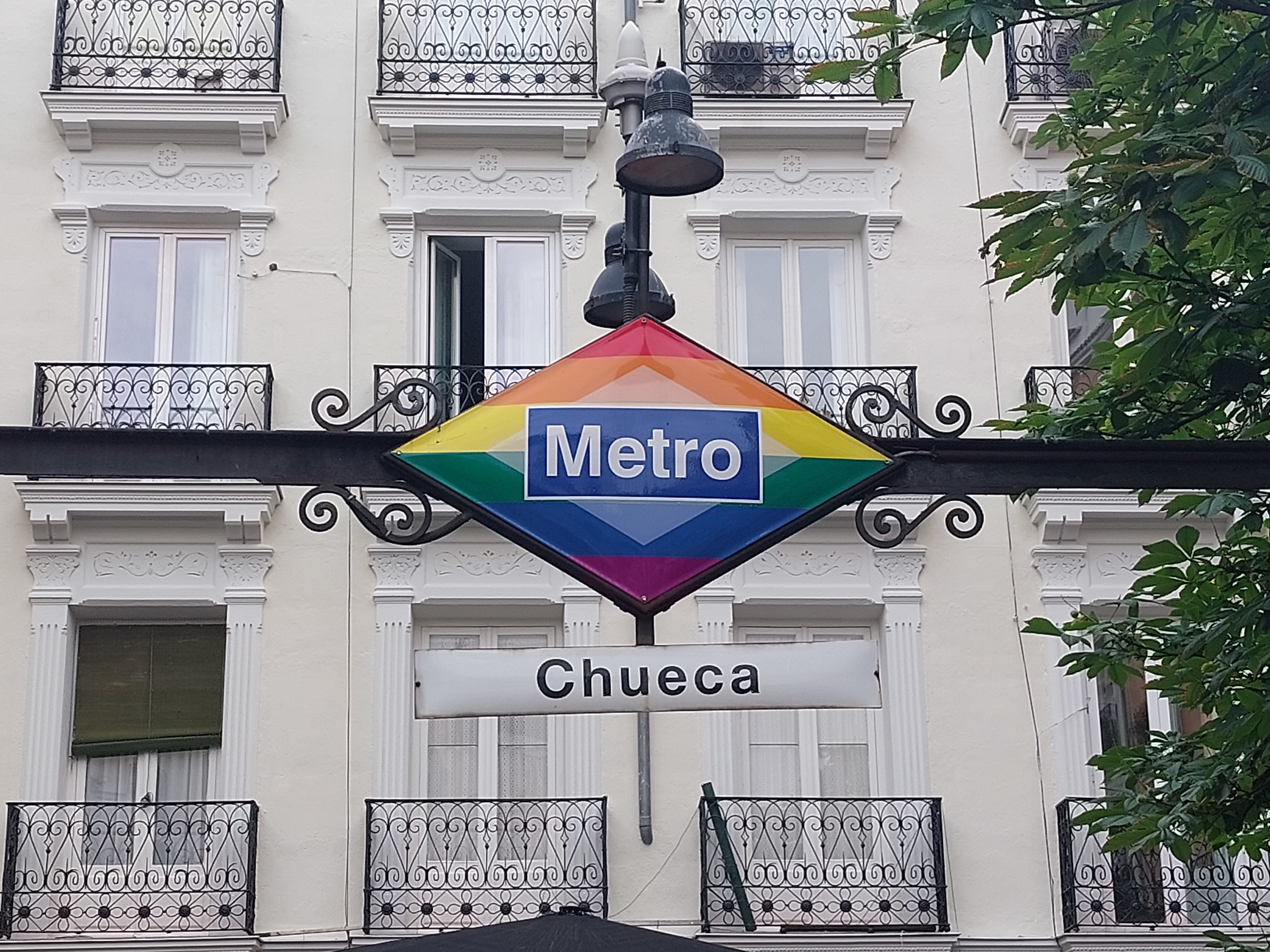
Chueca metro street sign

Chueca (Spanish pronunciation: [ˈtʃweka]) is an area of central Madrid, named after its main square, Plaza de Chueca. It is known as Madrid's gay neighbourhood. Plaza de Chueca was named after Spanish composer and author Federico Chueca.

It is located in the administrative ward in the central Madrid neighbourhood of Justicia.

Chueca is very lively, with many street cafes and boutique shops. Lonely Planet describes it as "extravagantly gay, lively young, and always inclusive regardless of your sexual orientation."

== Places of interest ==
- San Antón Church, which contains the bones of Saint Valentine
- Mercado de San Antón
- Plaza de Chueca
- Museo del Romanticismo

== Art in Chueca ==
In the later half of the 2010s, Chueca had become a centre for gay art. The Festival Visible which takes place every year during the Gay Pride, has included works by Jean Cocteau, Wilhelm van Gloeden, David Hochney, Tom of Finland, Roberto González Fernández or David Trullo. Shows such as "De bares hacia la exposicion" by Daniel Garbade in (2011) or the Illustrations : Chueca by Miguel Navia (2014) reflect through drawings and paintings the gay-neighbourhood.

Chueca is a favourite set for movies. Eloy de la Iglesias’s last production: Bulgarian Lovers (2003), an adaptation of the homonymous novel by Eduardo Mendicutti, was shot in the neighbourhood, as were other films such as Truman by Cesc Gay, Boystown by Juan Flahn, Bear Cub by Miguel Albaladejo, and Chef's Special by Nacho G. Velilla.

== Notable residents ==
- Danish-American actor Viggo Mortensen and his partner Ariadna Gil.
- Uruguayan musician Jorge Drexler.

== See also ==
- Chueca (Madrid Metro)
- Justicia
- Malasaña
- LGBT history in Spain
- Gay village
- Gay neighbourhoods in Spain
