= Cortes (Madrid) =

Coordinates: 40°24′51″N 3°41′53″W

- Ward of Madrid
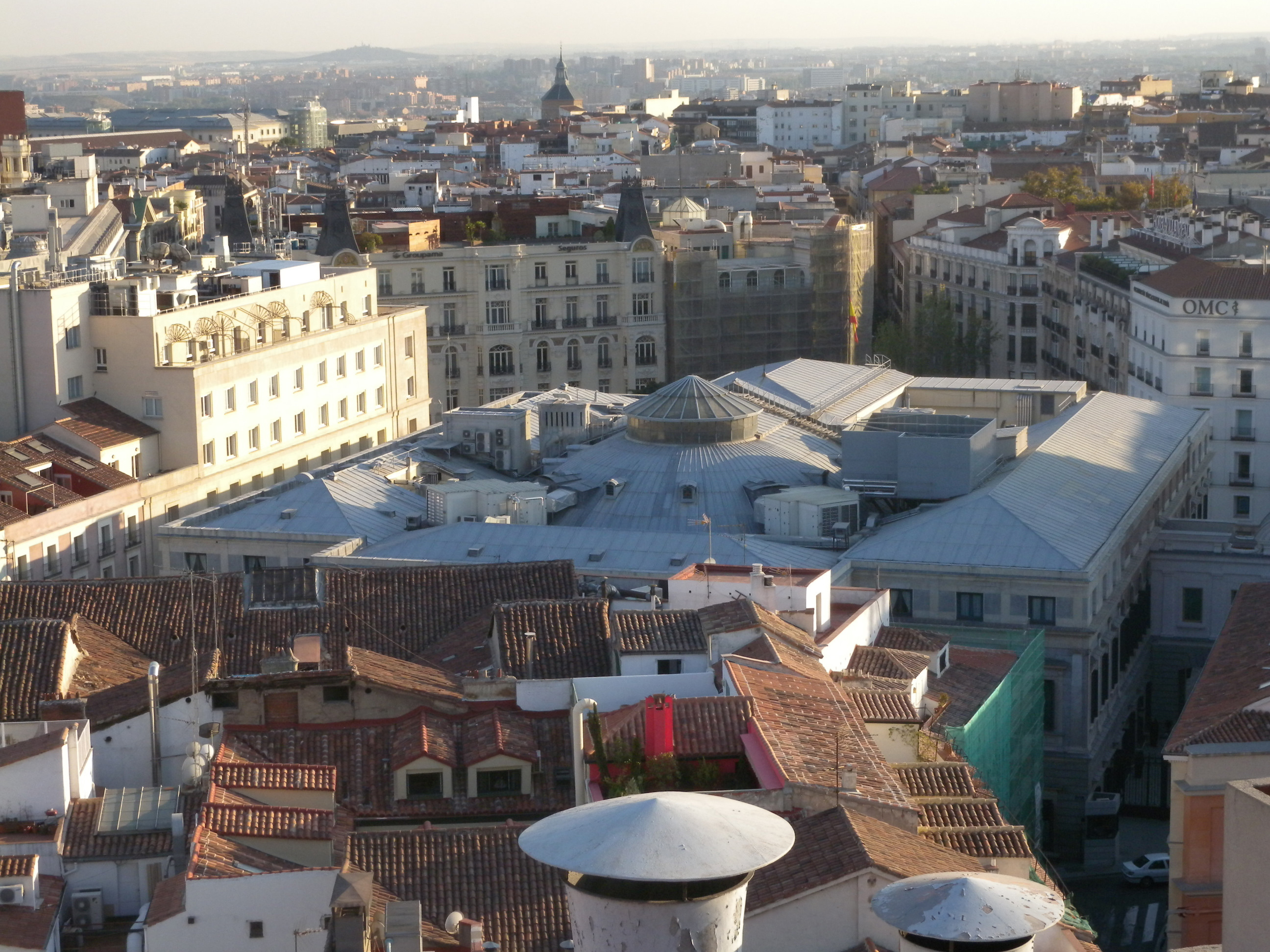
- Interactive map of Cortes
- Country: Spain
- Autonomous community: Madrid
- Municipality: Madrid
- District: Centro

Cortes (also known as Huertas) is an administrative ward (barrio) of Madrid belonging to the district of Centro.
