= Plaza de la Villa =

Public square in Madrid

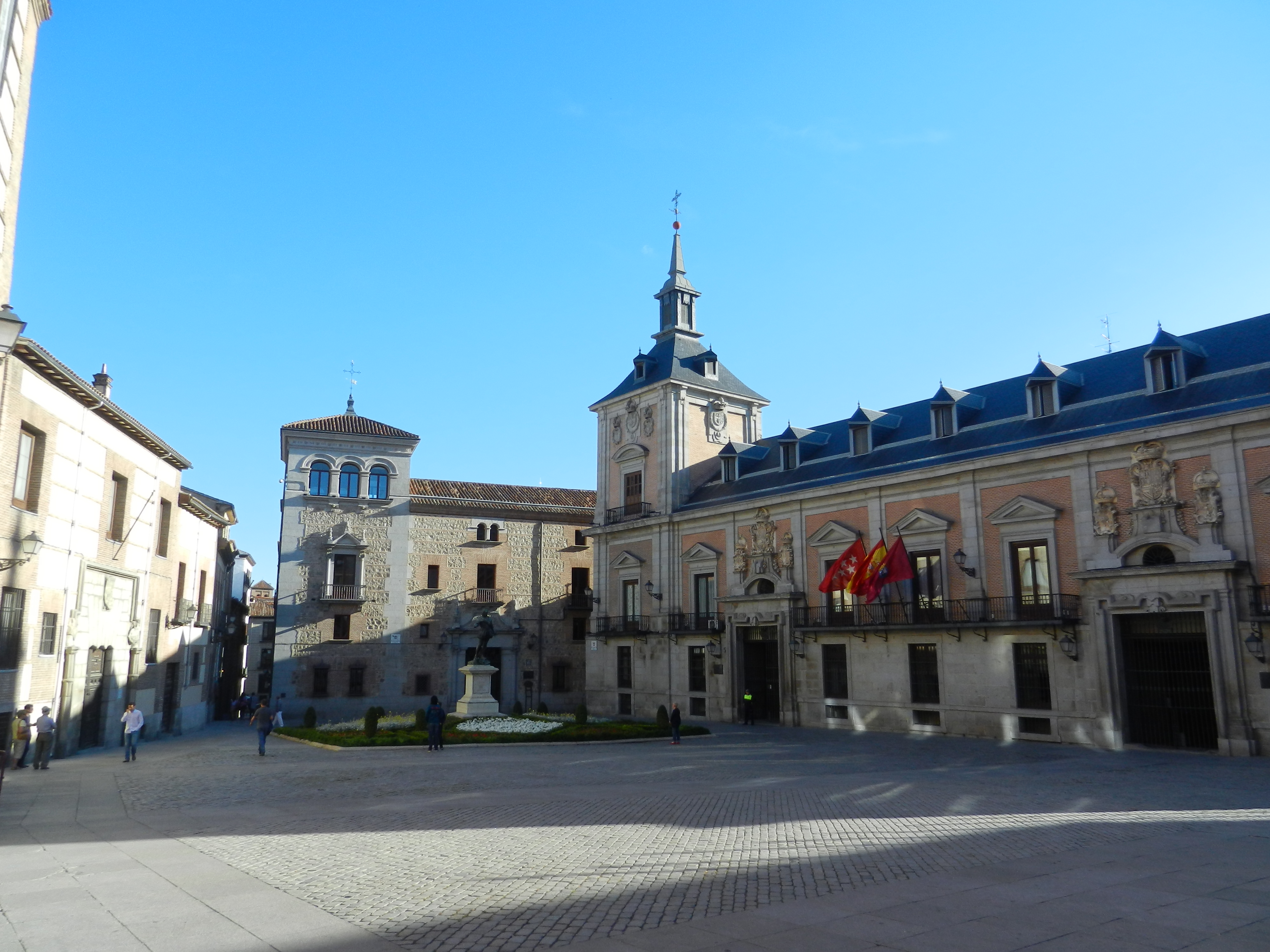
- Type: plaza
- Maintained by: Ayuntamiento of Madrid
- Location: Centro, Madrid, Spain
- Coordinates: 40.415285°N 3.710423°W

The plaza de la Villa is an urban square in central Madrid, Spain. The square, bordering the Calle Mayor, houses some of the oldest buildings still around in the city.

== History and description ==
It lies in the Palacio neighborhood, part of the Centro District.

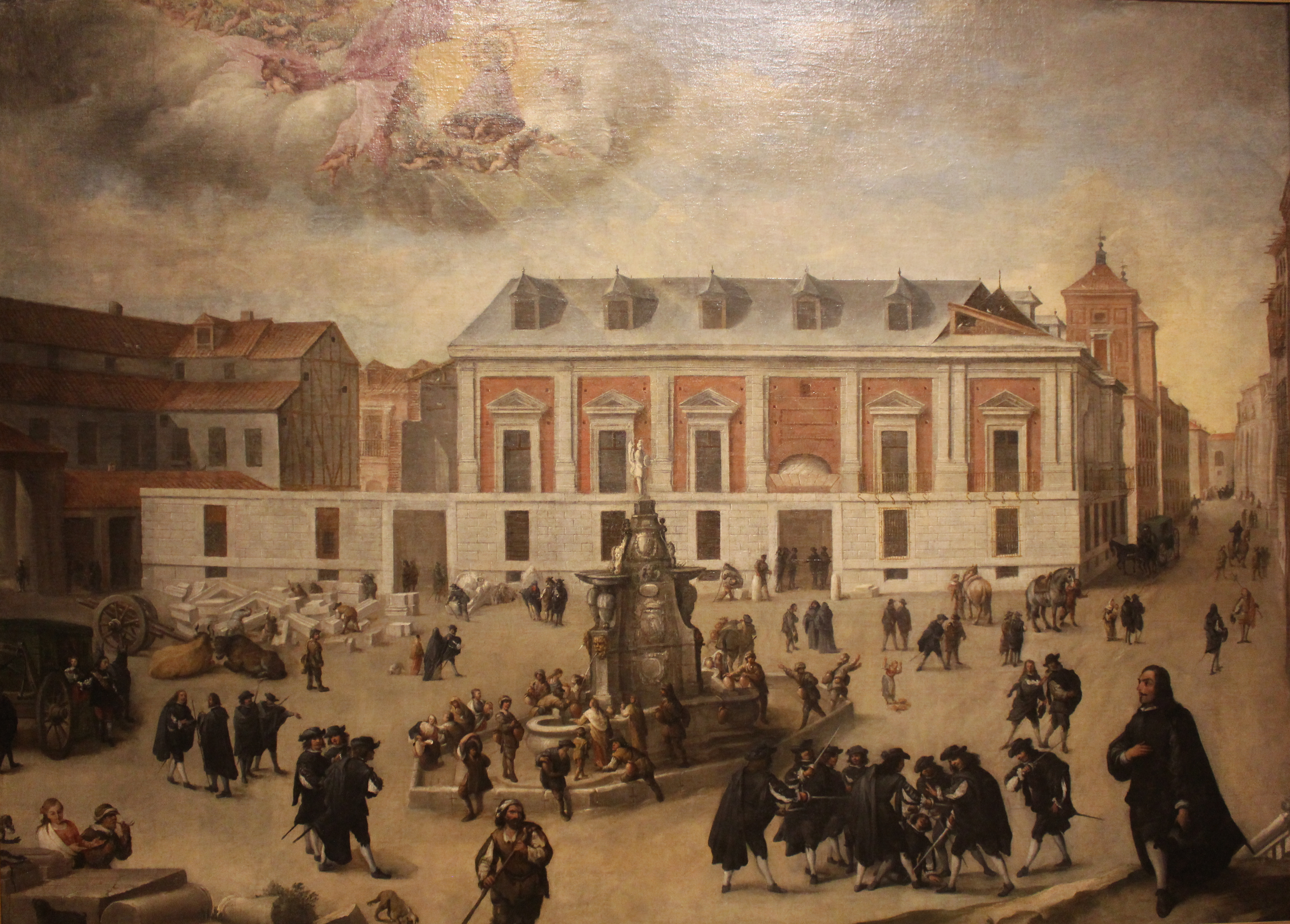
Miracle of the Virgin of Atocha during the construction works of the Casa de la Villa (late 17th-century).

It was known as "Plaza de San Salvador" in ancient times, as it was located near the (now defunct) Church of San Salvador, in whose atrium the primitive municipal council convened (the church was demolished in 1842). In 1463 Henry IV of Castile granted a market day in the square on Tuesdays. The Casa de los Lujanes (with its adjacent tower), dated from the 15th-century, is the oldest civil building in Madrid. The tradition states the tower was the location where Francis I of France was held captive after his capture in the 1525 Battle of Pavia.

Other buildings in the square are the 16th-century Casa de Cisneros and the old city hall, the Casa de la Villa de Madrid. The primitive Fountain of San Salvador (or Fuente de la Villa), located in the centre of the square, also disappeared.

In 1888, a statue of Álvaro de Bazán by sculptor Mariano Benlliure was commissioned for the 300th anniversary of his death; the square was chosen as location both because of its centrality and because of its small size the sculpture would stand out most; the inauguration took place on 19 December 1891.

== See also ==
- Roman Sepulchral way

== Bibliography ==
- Dorado, Facundo (1913). "Plaza de la Villa". Casa de la Villa (PDF). Madrid: Imprenta Municipal. pp. 3–6.
- Mesonero Romanos, Ramón de (1861). El antiguo Madrid. Paseos históricos-anecdóticos por las calles y casas de esta villa. Vol. I.
- Revilla González, Fidel (2018). La Plaza Mayor de Madrid. Cuatrocientos años de historia (PDF). Madrid.
- Rodrigo, Belén (7 April 2019). "La Casa de los Lujanes de Madrid, el centenario torreón donde estuvo preso el rey de Francia". ABC.
