= Casa de la Villa (Madrid) =

Building in Madrid

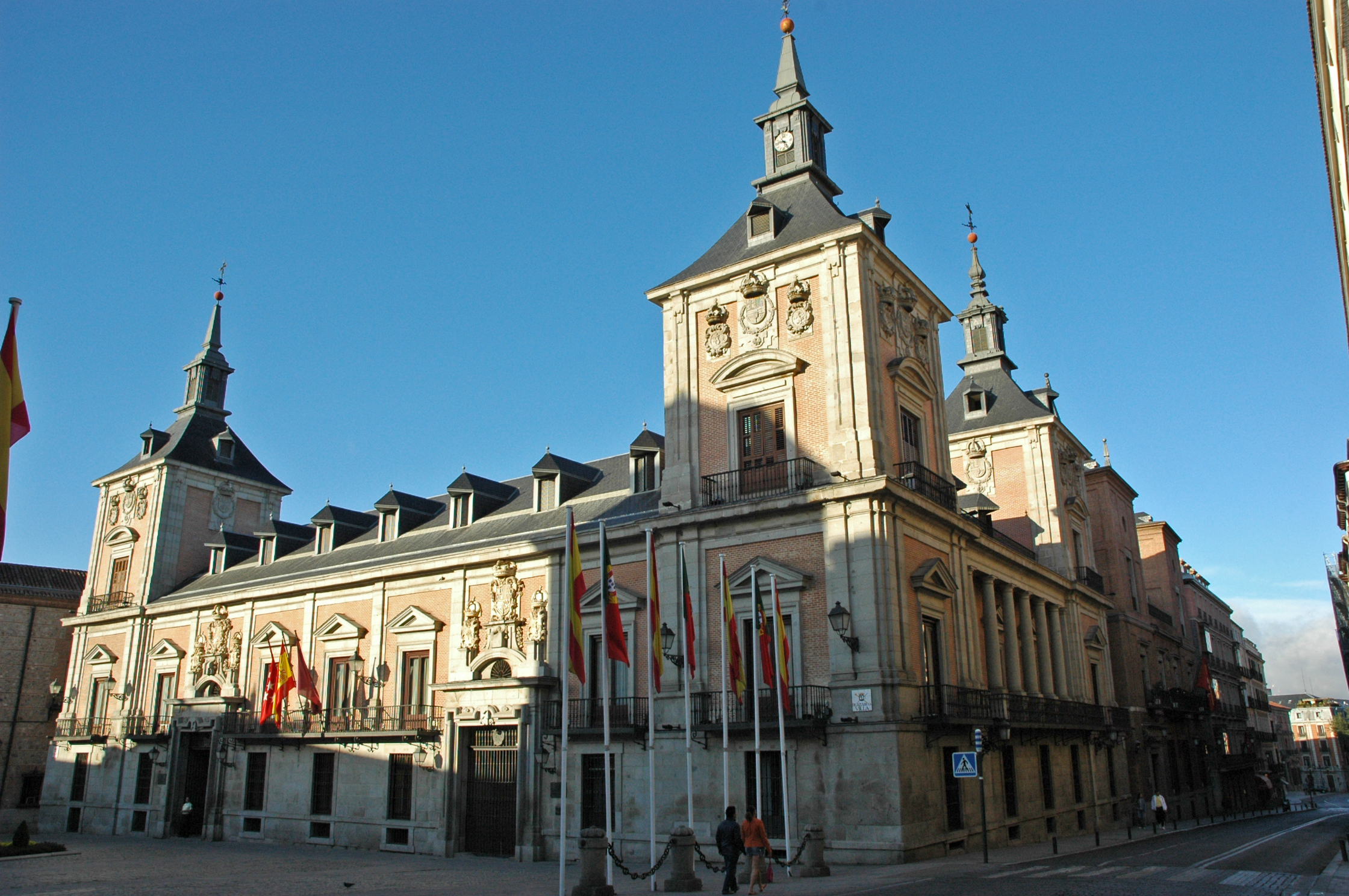
- Interactive map of the Casa de la Villa area

General information
- Architectural style: Herrerian
- Location: Plaza de la Villa 5, Madrid, Spain
- Coordinates: 40.41525°N 3.710736°W
- Construction started: 1631
- Completed: 1692
- Owner: Ayuntamiento de Madrid

The Casa de la Villa is a building located in Madrid, Spain. It served as city hall from the 17th to the 21st century.

It lies at the Plaza de la Villa, near the Calle Mayor.

Following the demolition of some housing that had served as provisional headquarters of the city council (prior to that, the city council convened at the Church of San Salvador, located nearby), the project for the new building was commissioned in 1629 to Juan Gómez de Mora. Following the death of the latter, José de Villarreal, Teodoro de Ardemans and José del Olmo assumed the direction of the building works. Besides its role as city hall, the building was also intended to be used as municipal prison, replacing the old Cárcel de la Villa. The works finished in 1692.

Following the refurbishment of the Palacio de Comunicaciones and the move of the municipal premises to the former (a process finished in 2011), the Casa de la Villa was left with little use. It currently houses some offices of the different municipal groups represented at the Plenary and it is used for official receptions. Despite having a report for its declaration as historic-artistic monument initiated in 1977, the building has yet to be declared Bien de Interés Cultural.
