= Chueca (Madrid Metro) =

Madrid Metro station

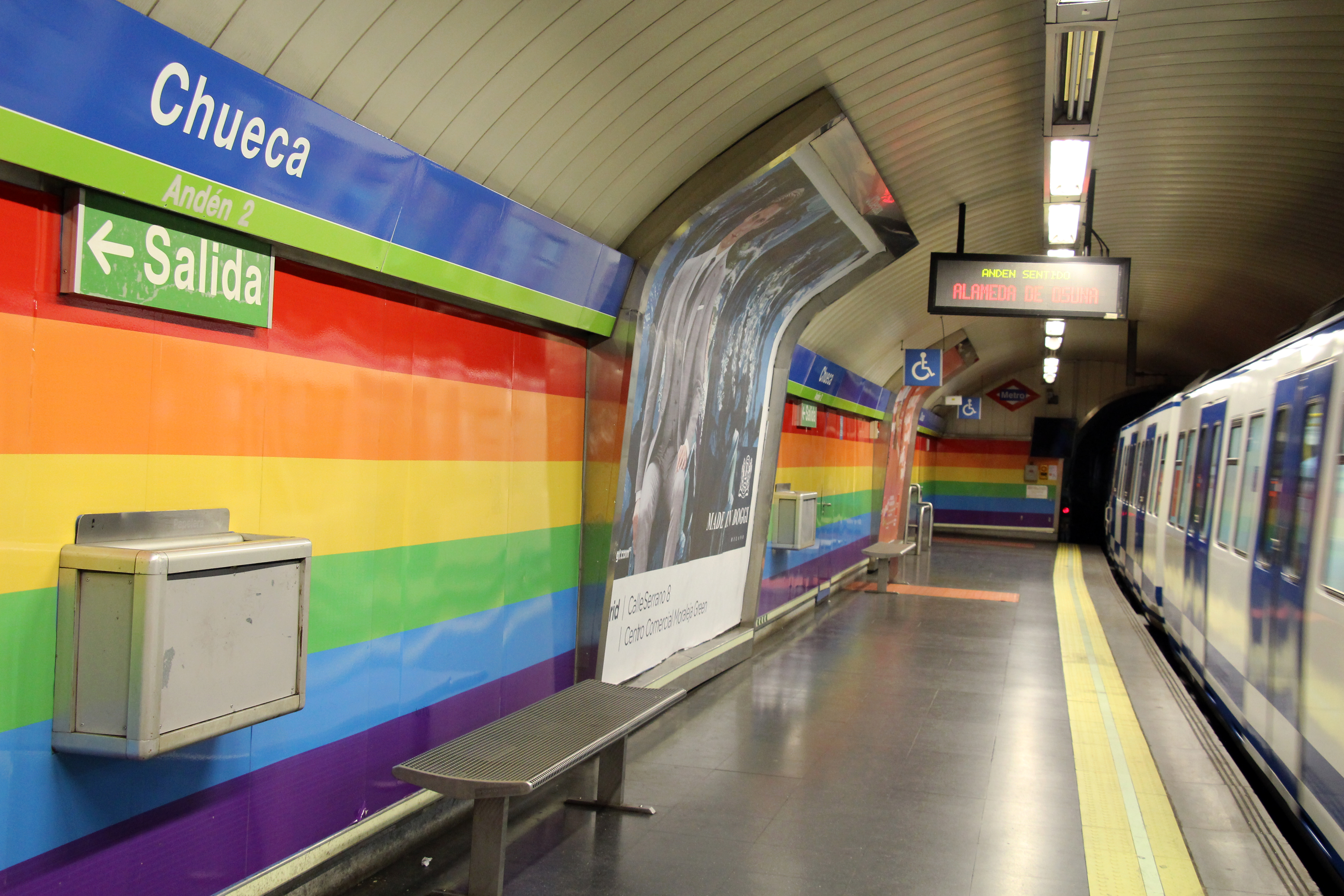

General information
- Location: Centro, Madrid; Spain
- Coordinates: 40.4226162°N 3.6976649°W
- System: Madrid Metro station
- Owner: CRTM
- Operator: CRTM

Construction
- Accessible: No

Other information
- Fare zone: A

History
- Opened: 26 February 1970

Services
Preceding station	Madrid Metro	Following station
Alonso Martínez towards Alameda de Osuna	Line 5	Gran Vía towards Casa de Campo
Location
- Location within Madrid

Chueca [ˈtʃweka] is a station on Line 5 of the Madrid Metro. It is located in Zone A. It serves Chueca, famous for being a hotspot for gay and lesbian groups and culture.
