= Sol (Madrid) =

Coordinates: 40°25′0″N 3°42′14″W

- Neighborhood
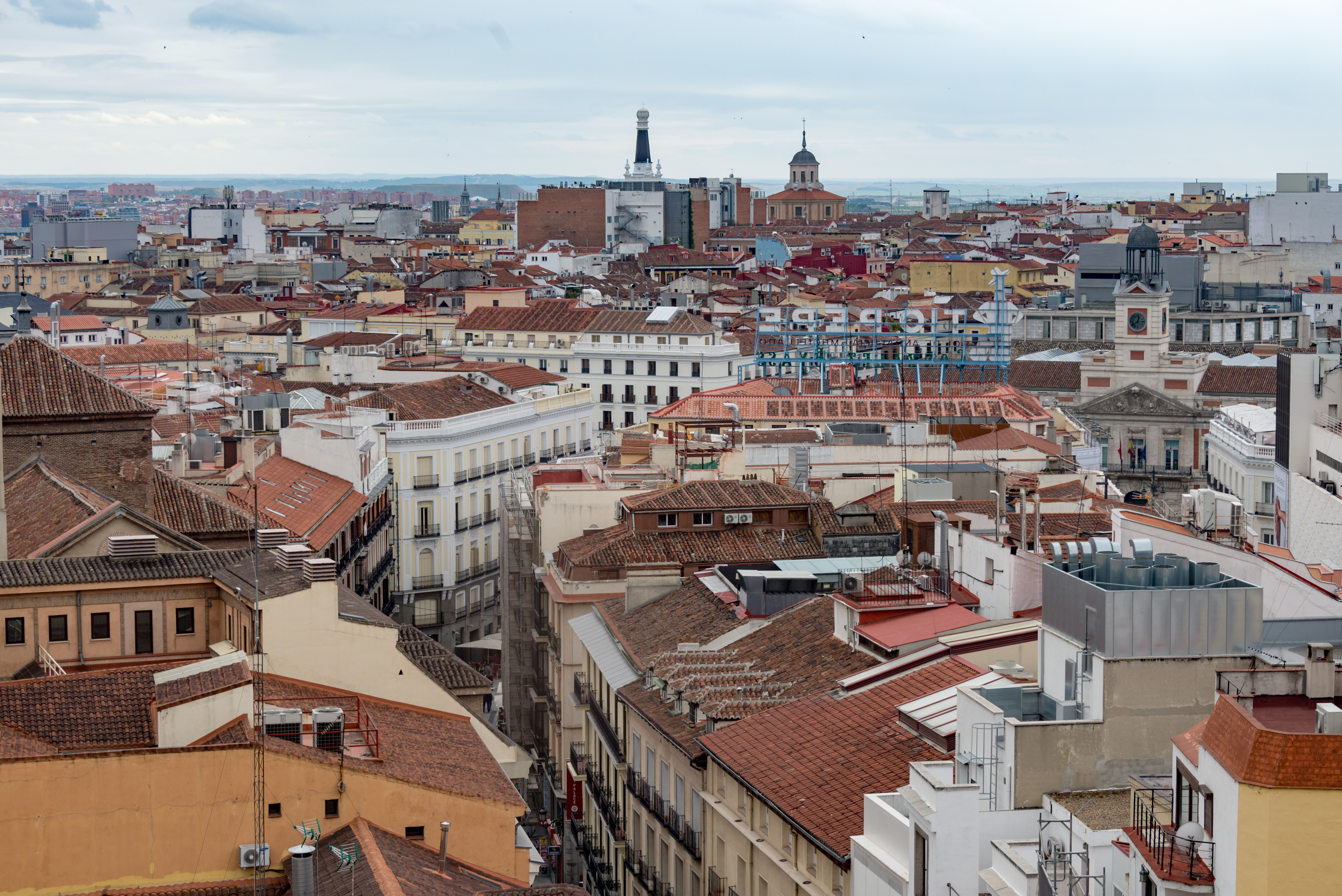
- Country: Spain
- Aut. community: Madrid
- Municipality: Madrid
- District: Centro

Sol is an administrative neighborhood (barrio) of Madrid belonging to the district of Centro.

It has a total area of around 44.5 hectares (less than 0.1% out of the total municipal area). Hugely affected by the impact of tourism, by 2018 it had over 2 tourists per 1 permanent dweller.
