= Justicia (Madrid) =

Coordinates: 40°25′26″N 3°41′47″W

- Ward of Madrid
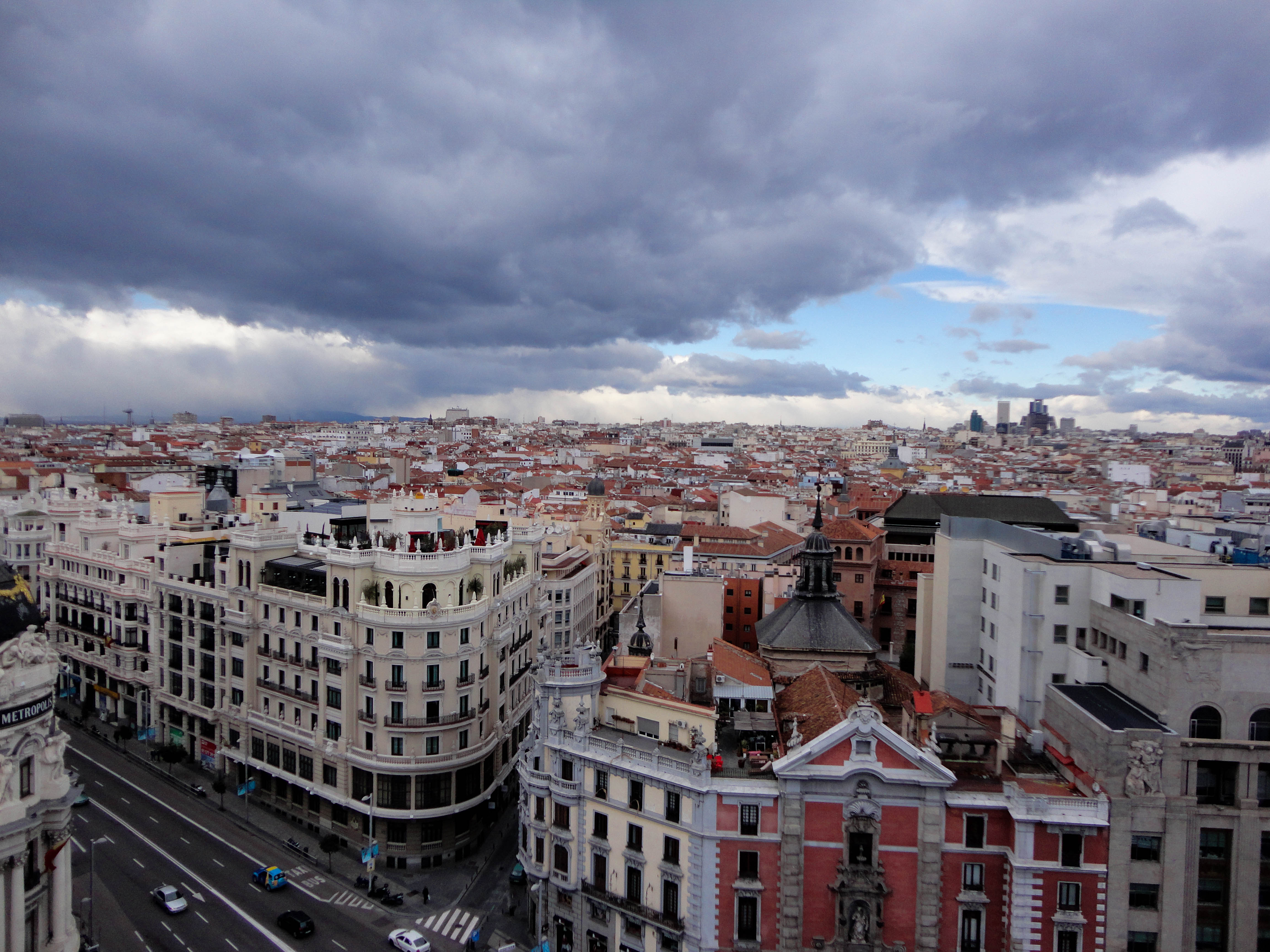
- Interactive map of Justicia
- Country: Spain
- Autonomous community: Madrid
- Municipality: Madrid
- District: Centro

Justicia is a ward (barrio) of Madrid belonging to the district of Centro.

It contains the neighborhoods of Chueca and Salesas.
