= El Madrid de los Austrias =

Old centre of Madrid

Coordinates: 40°24′56″N 3°42′26″W

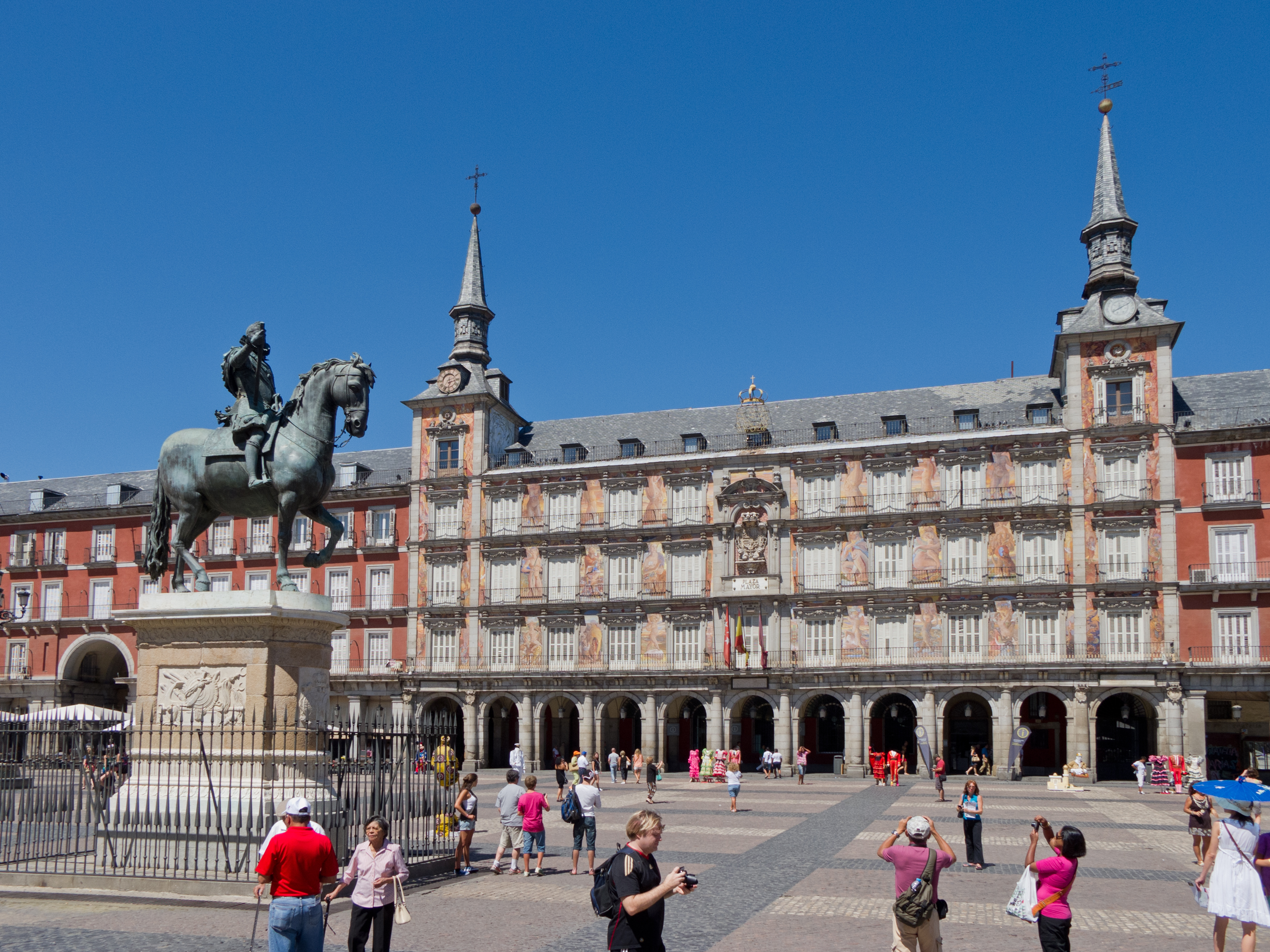
Plaza Mayor

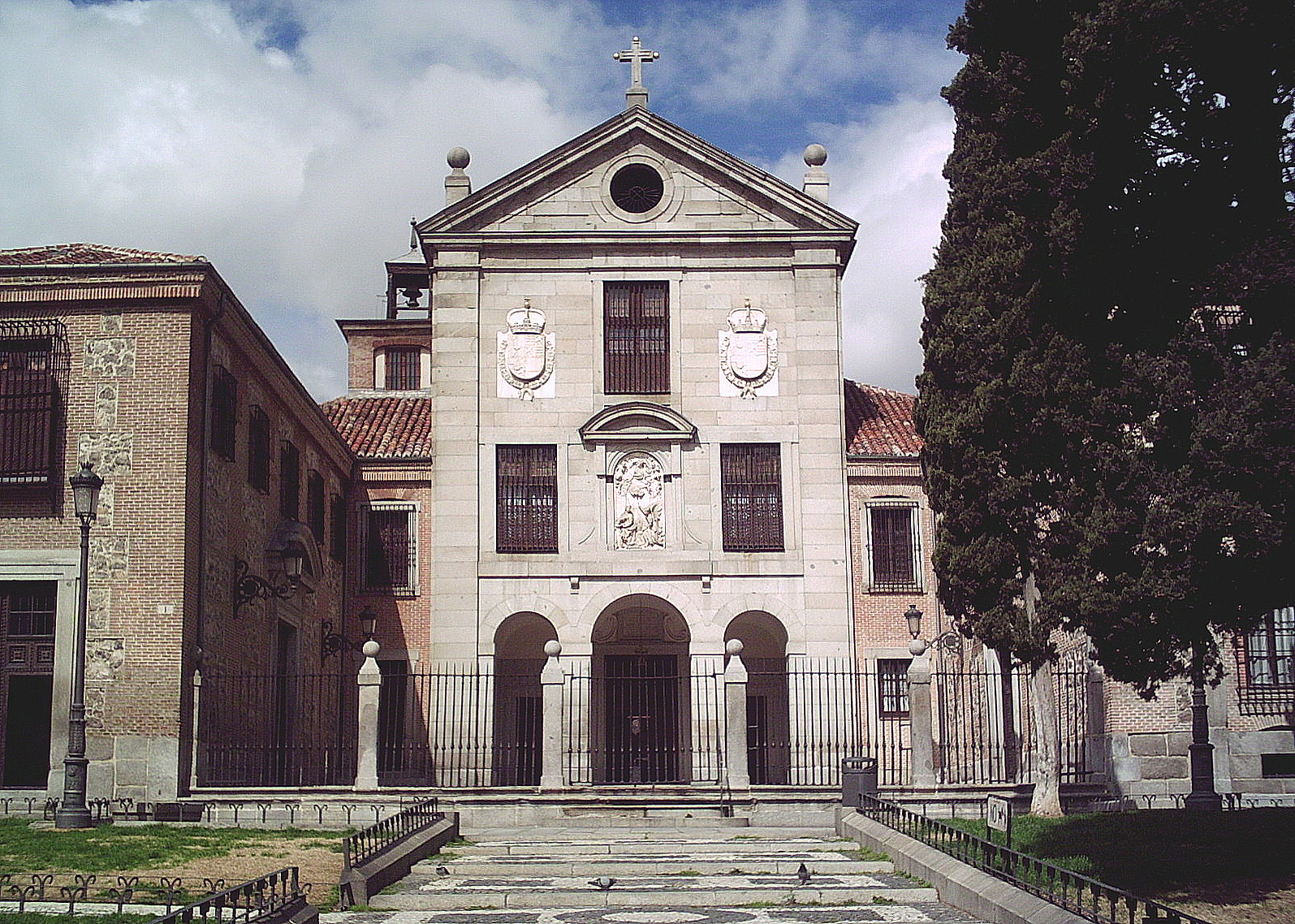
Royal Convent of La Encarnación

El Madrid de los Austrias (English: The Madrid of the Austrians or the Habsburgs) is a name used for the old centre of Madrid, built during the reign of the Habsburg Dynasty (1516–1700), known in Spain as Casa de Austria. The area is located south of the Calle Mayor, in between the Metro stations Sol and Ópera.

== General ==
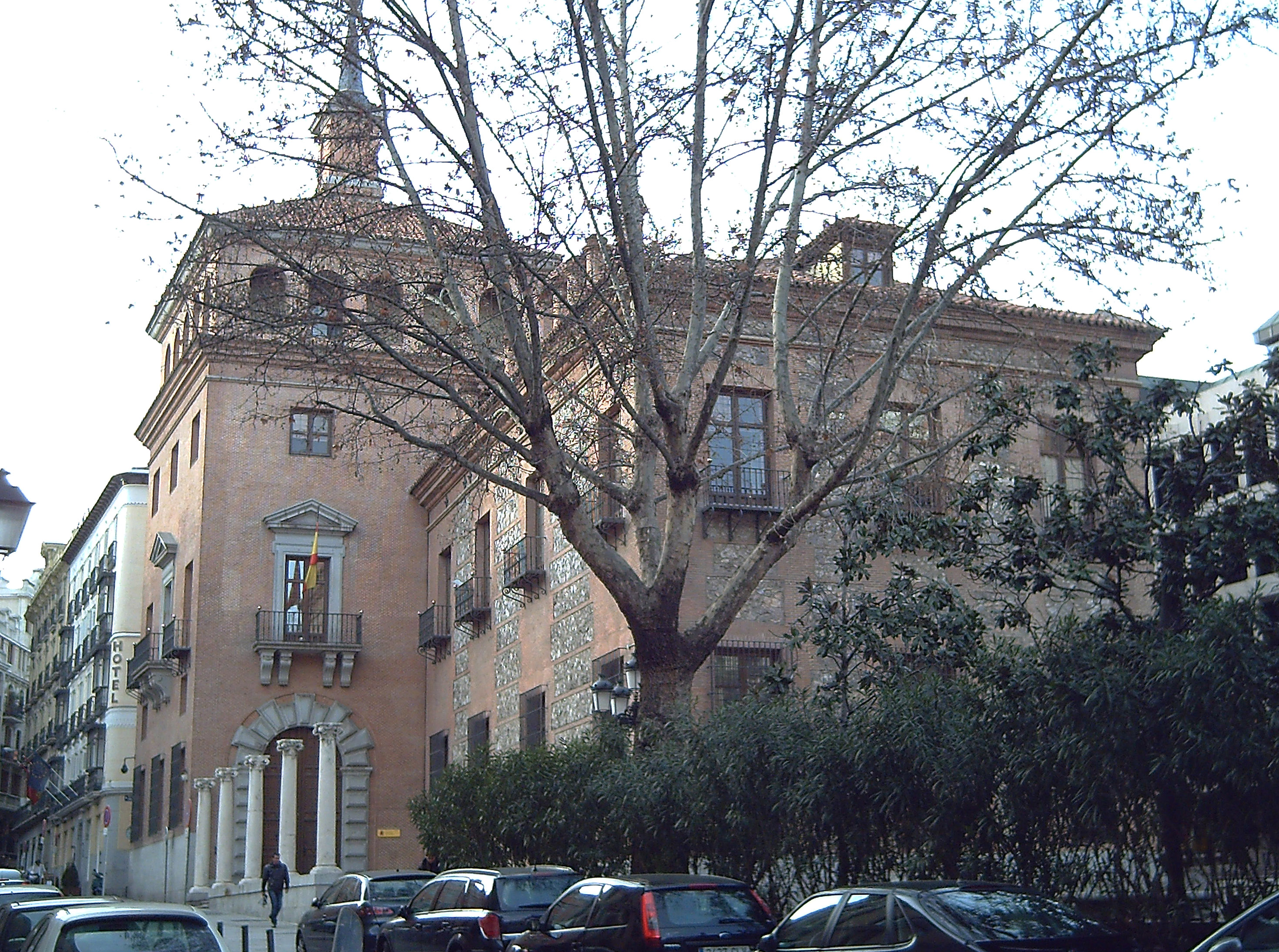
Casa de las Siete Chimeneas

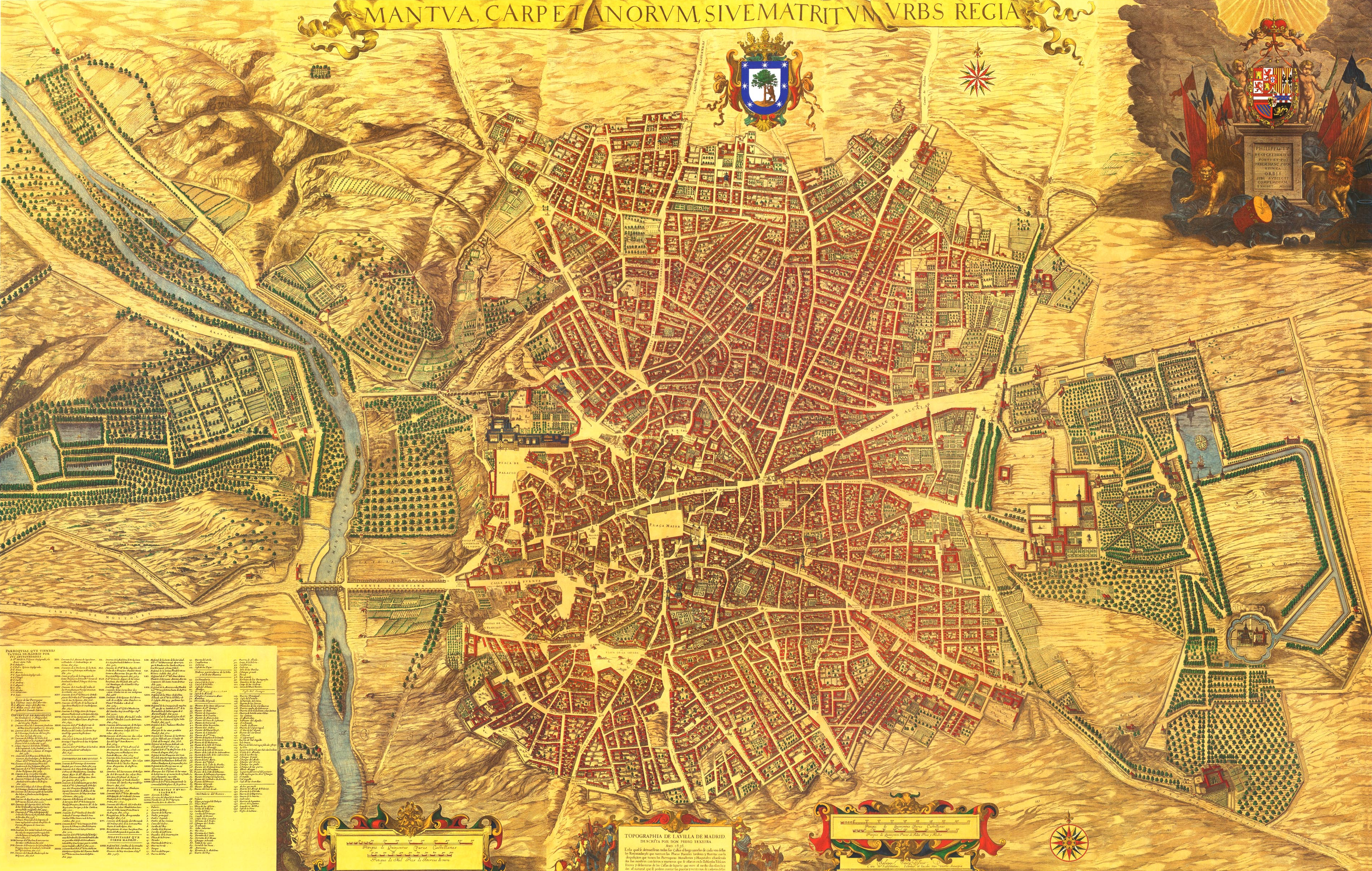
Map of Madrid by Pedro Teixeira Albernaz (1656)

Madrid first became the capital in the 16th century, Spain's Golden Age. The kingdom underwent enormous economic growth by virtue of its provinces in Hispanoamerica. The Habsburgs commissioned a variety of buildings and infrastructure projects, in order to represent their power and wealth through their shaping of public space. El Madrid de los Austrias subsequently took the name of its builders, the Spanish Habsburgs, who are known as "the Austrians" in Spanish. Its typical architectural style ranges from the late Renaissance through the early Baroque.

The most notable Habsburg construction and the essential part of El Madrid de los Austrias is the Plaza Mayor, in the middle of which stands a statue of its builder, Philip III of Spain. Laid out in 1619, the Plaza Mayor is a large, rectangular plaza with arcades and nine entrances. It is maintained in a colorful dark red and orange; these colors were chosen in a citywide poll. The Plaza Mayor was the scene of bullfights, executions, and coronations.

== Reign of Phillip II ==
Before becoming the capital, in 1535, Madrid was 72 hectares in area, increasing to 134 in 1565, four years after the establishment of the Court in the town. At the end of the reign of Philip II, the town occupied 282 hectares and had about 7590 homes, three times more than in 1563 (2,250), shortly after the appointment of Madrid as capital.

The intense housing activity of this period was not sufficient to meet the demand for housing by courtiers and servants of the Crown. This induced the king to issue the edict known as Regalía de Aposento, through which property owners of more than one floor were forced to give one to a family of the court.

This decree encouraged the development of what became known as casas a la malicia, a kind of home in which the owners, attempting to avoid compliance with the decree, used different solutions (a single storey, excessive compartmentalization of the interior or concealment of the upper floor from view from the roads ...).

== Palacio de Santa Cruz ==
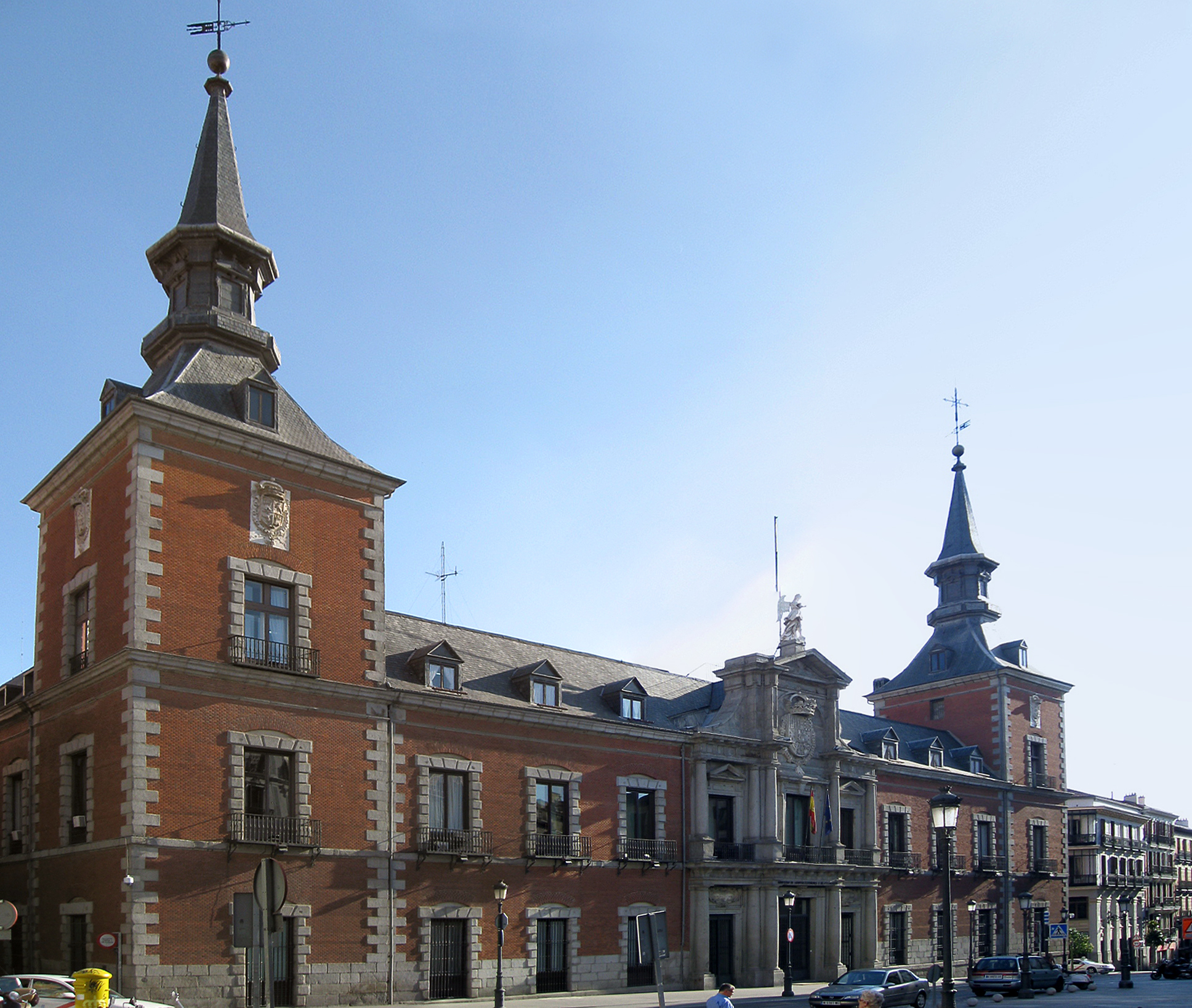
Palacio de Santa Cruz

The Palacio de Santa Cruz, located on the Plaza de Santa Cruz, was built between 1629 and 1643. Characteristic of Habsburg architecture is the red façade with white-framed windows and it resembles the style of the Plaza Mayor. The structure has two prominent corner towers with pointed roofs, and originally accommodated a prison, the Cárcel de la Corte. Here the condemned would be held before being taken to the adjacent Plaza Mayor for execution. One famous prisoner was the bandit Luis Candelas, a sort of Spanish Robin Hood, who was executed in November 1837.

Despite the Spanish Civil War and the subsequent reconstruction, the palace has lost little of its original form. Briefly hosting the Ministro de Ultramar (Overseas Ministry), since 1931 it has been the seat of the Ministry of Foreign Affairs.

== Plaza de la Villa ==
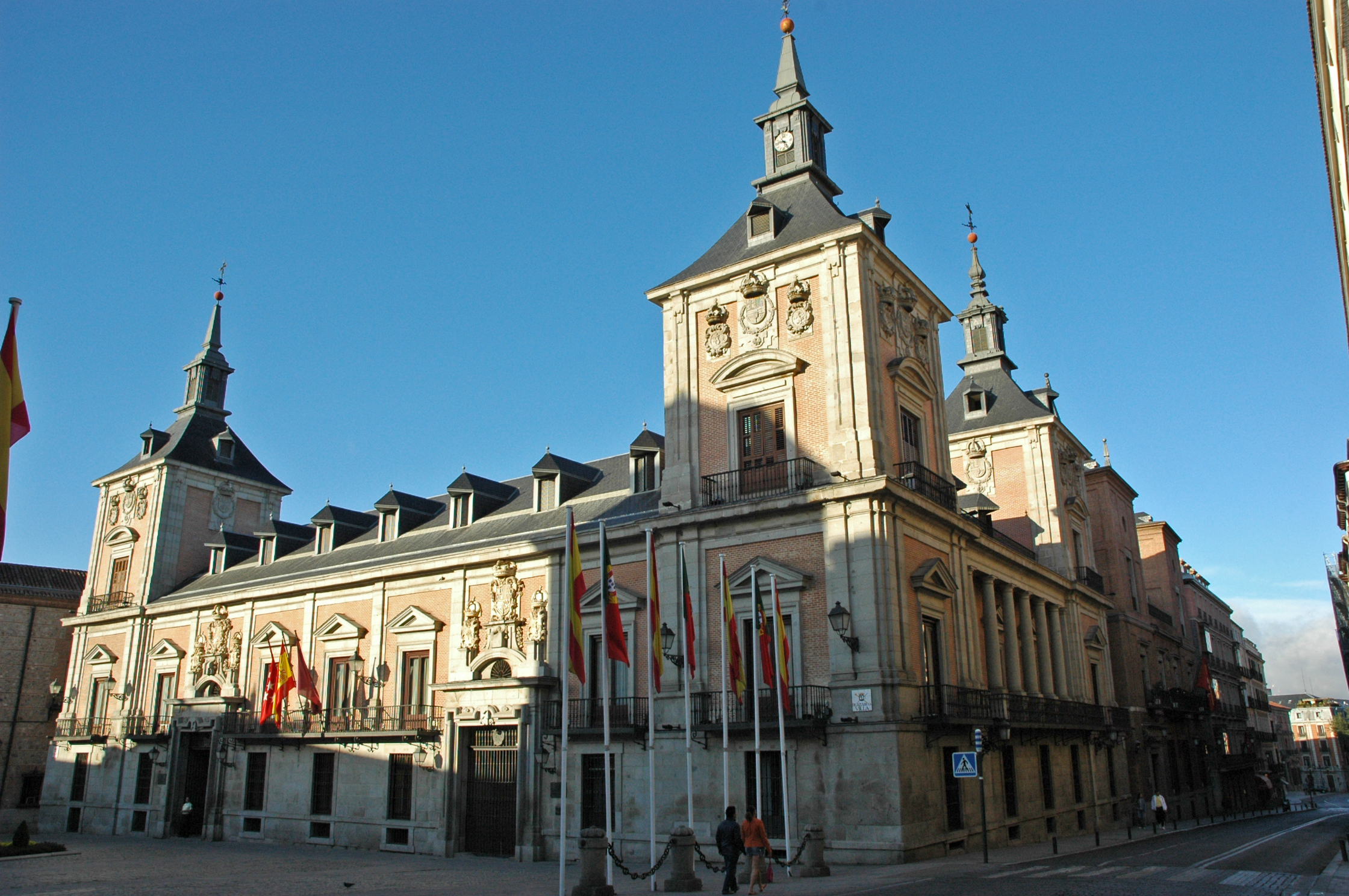
Casa de la Villa ("Town Hall")

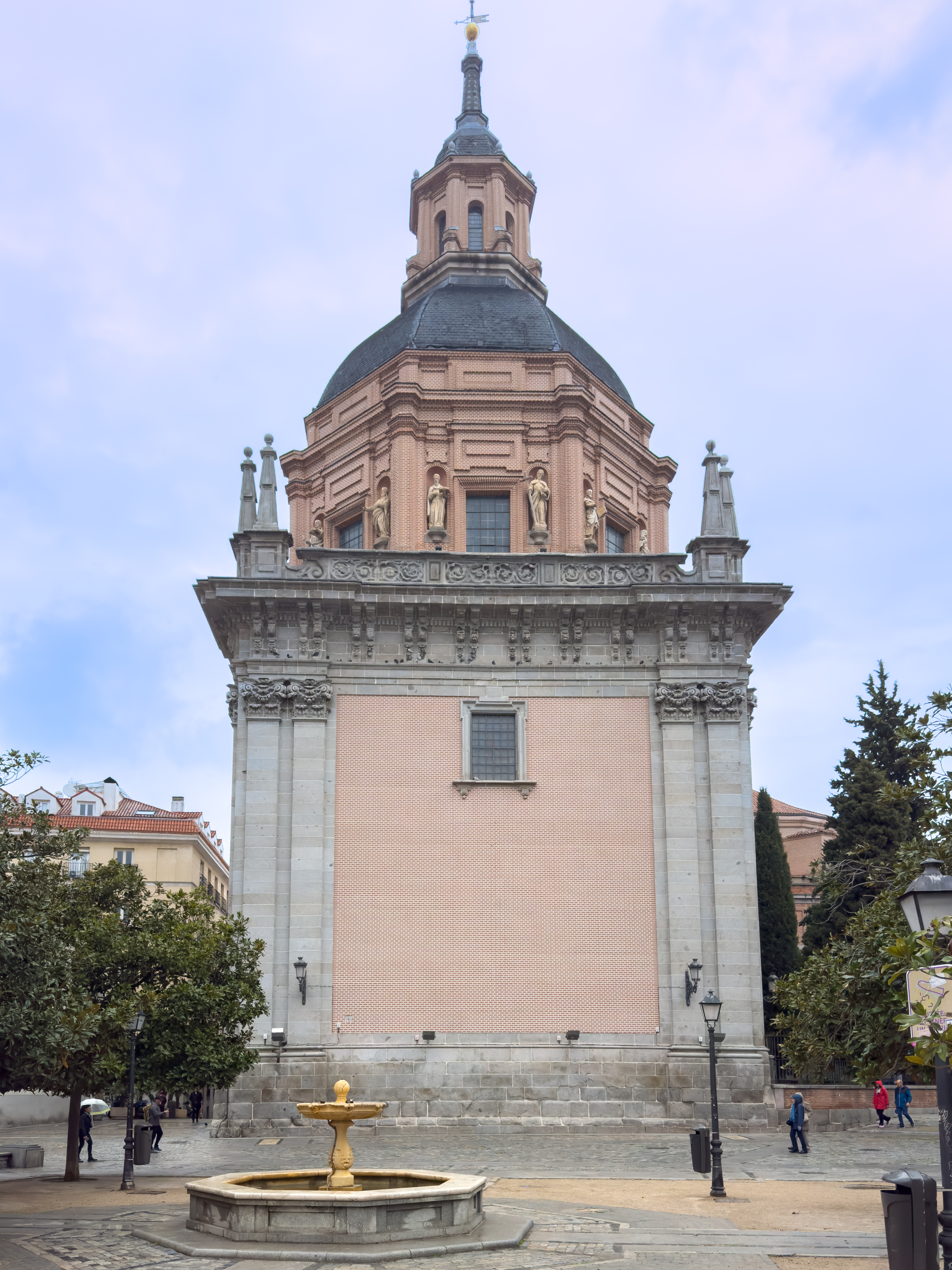
San Andrés Church

Several important buildings are also located in the Plaza de la Villa, one of the oldest plazas in Madrid. The oldest building is the Torre de los Lujanes, built in the Gothic style in the 15th century. Strictly speaking the Torre does not belong to the Habsburg period, though it is situated in the Madrid de los Austrias. Another building, the Casa de Cisneros, was built in 1537. Alongside it is the Ayuntamiento, the old town hall. It was built by the architect Juan Gómez de Mora, designer of the Plaza Mayor, and it is architecturally similar with a relatively austere red-orange façade and mansard roof, and steep-roofed corner towers.

Other important buildings include:

- Iglesia de San Andrés (St. Andrew's Church)
- The Plaza de las Descalzas with the cloister monastery of the Descalzas Reales
- The Casa de las Siete Chimeneas (literally "House of the Seven Chimneys") on the Plaza del Rey
- The Puente de Segovia (Bridge to Segovia)
- The Palace of Uceda
