= Calle Mayor (Madrid) =

Street in Madrid, Spain

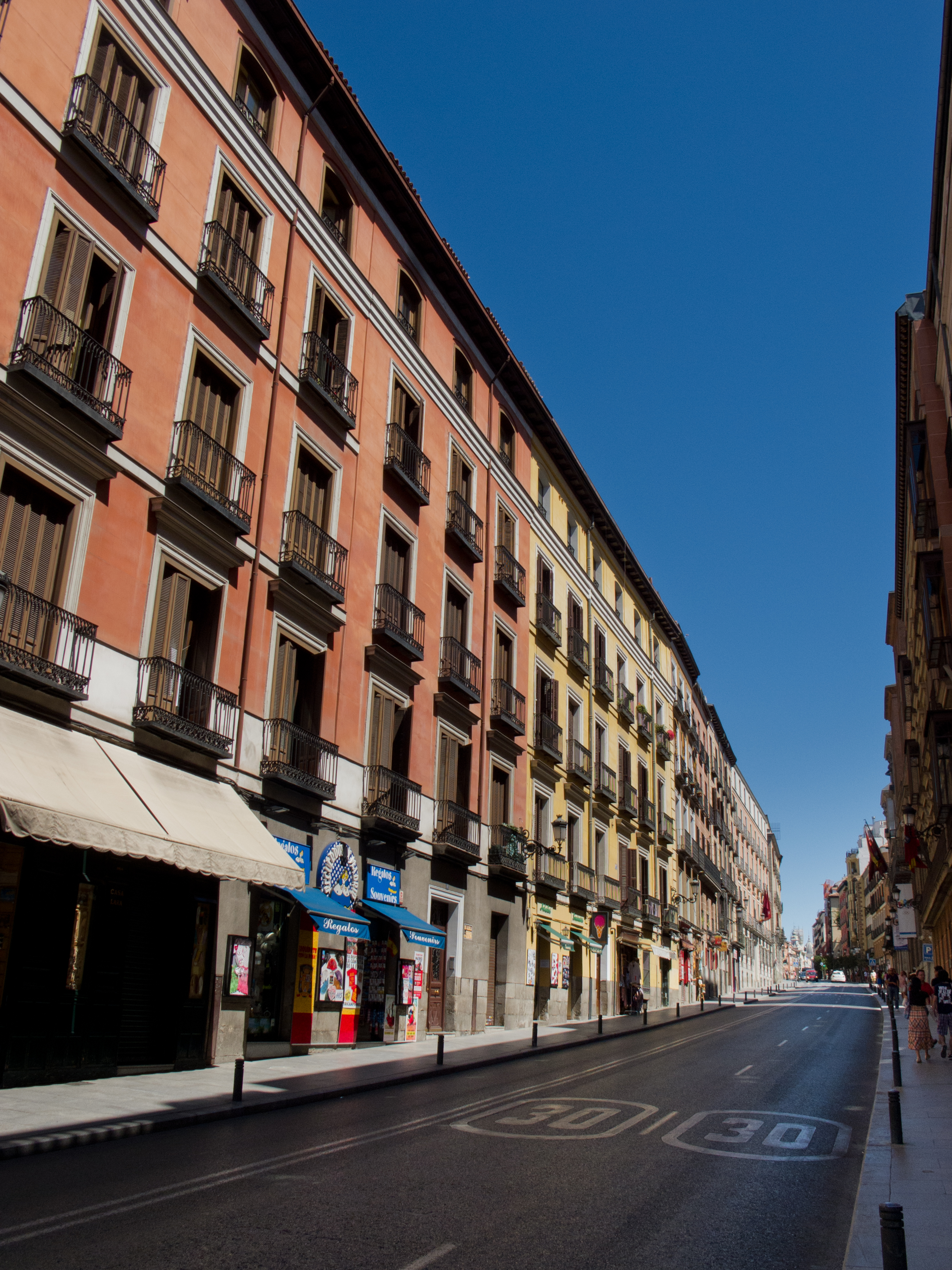
- Interactive map of Calle Mayor
- Type: street
- Location: Madrid, Spain
- East end: Puerta del Sol
- West end: Cuesta de la Vega

The Calle Mayor is a centric street in Madrid, Spain. Located in the Centro District, the Calle Mayor starts in the Puerta del Sol and ends at the cuesta de la Vega.

== History ==
Created in the Middle Ages it originally connected the alcázar with the Puerta de Guadalajara (a disappeared wall gate). The Calle Mayor, that borders the Plaza Mayor to the North, became the main thoroughfare of the city in the Early Modern Period. The Calle Mayor was the place where the guilds of silversmiths and jewelers concentrated. In the 18th century, the street was divided in three sections with different names: Almudena (from the alcázar surroundings to the Plazuela de la Villa; Platería (from the plazuela de la Villa to the Puerta de Guadalajara), and Mayor (from the Puerta de Guadalajara to the Puerta del Sol).

== Bibliography ==
- Peñasco de la Puente, Hilario; Cambronero, Carlos (1889). Las calles de Madrid: noticias, tradiciones y curiosidades. Madrid: Establecimiento tipográfico de D. Enrique Rubiños. pp. 321–326.
- Escobar, Jesús (2004). "Francisco De Sotomayor and Nascent Urbanism in Sixteenth-Century Madrid". The Sixteenth Century Journal. 35 (2): 357–382. doi:10.2307/20476940. JSTOR 20476940.
- Jiménez Priego, María Teresa (1997). "Perfil del joyero". Espacio, Tiempo y Forma. Serie VII, Historia del Arte. 10 (10). Madrid: Universidad Nacional de Educación a Distancia: 59–110. doi:10.5944/etfvii.10.1997.2295. ISSN 1130-4715.
- Sambricio, Carlos (1996). "Una propuesta urbana para la Calle Mayor" (PDF). Arquitectura (307). Madrid: Colegio Oficial de Arquitectos de Madrid: 29–38. ISSN 0004-2706.
- Sambricio, Carlos (2002). "Un proyecto fracasado: las transformaciones de la calle Mayor en el siglo XVIII". Historia Contemporánea (24). Bilbao: University of the Basque Country. ISSN 1130-2402.
