= Palacio de la Marquesa de Sonora =

Palace of the Marchioness of Sonora
- Palacio de la Marquesa de Sonora (Spanish)
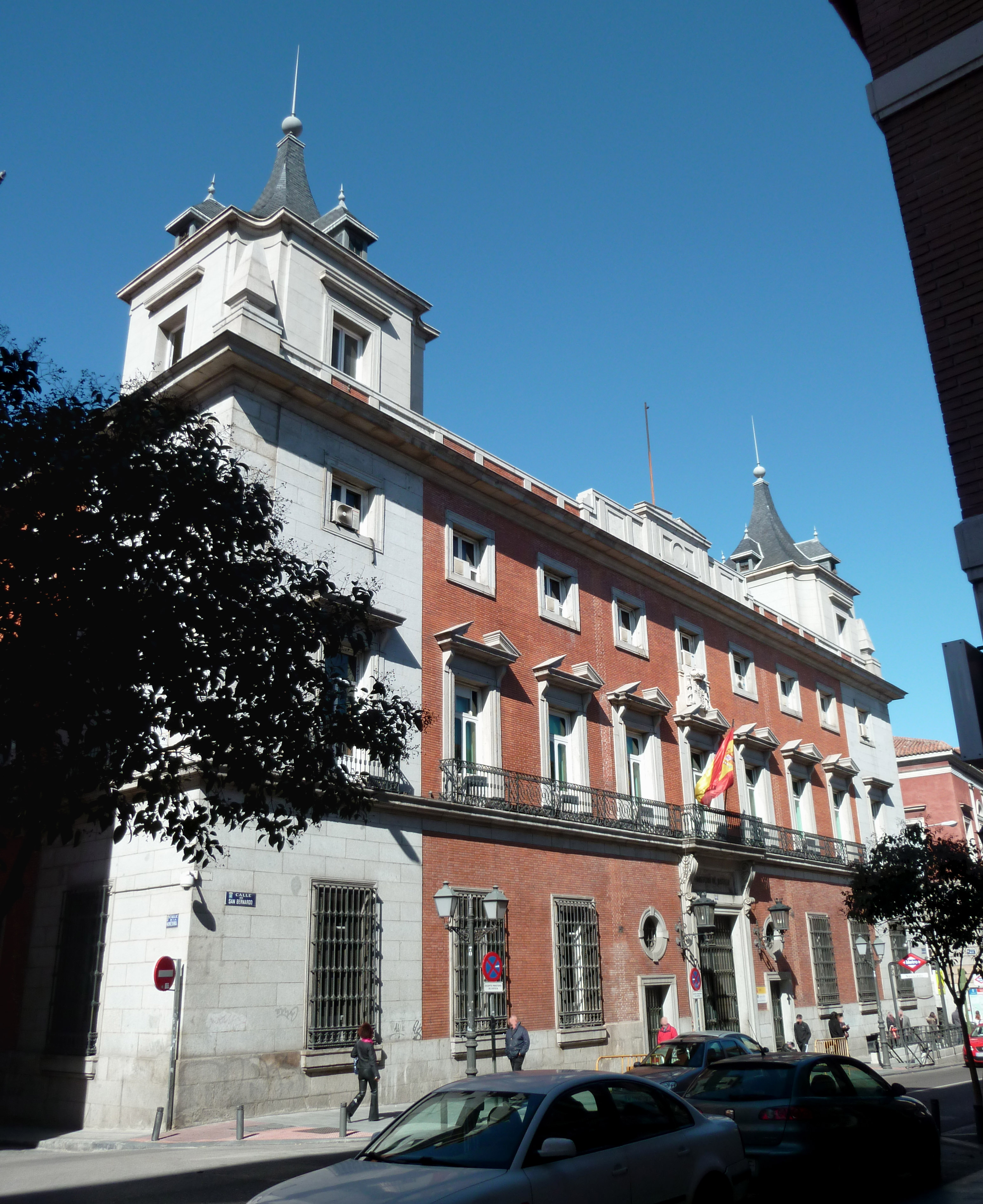

- Location within Spain
- 40.424157°N 3.707538°W
- Location: Madrid, Spain

History
- Built: 1745

Site notes
- Architect: Evaristo del Castillo
- Architectural style: Neoclassical

Spanish Cultural Heritage
- Official name: Palacio de la Marquesa de Sonora
- Type: Singular
- Criteria: Monument
- Designated: 1995
- Reference no.: RI-51-0009109

The Palace of the Marchioness of Sonora (Spanish: Palacio de la Marquesa de Sonora) is a palace located in Madrid, Spain.

The building was originally built for the Antonio José Álvarez de Abreu, 1st Marquess of Regalía in 1745. It was purchased by María de la Concepción Valenzuela, Marchioness of Sonora—third wife of the 18th-century statesman, José de Gálvez, 1st Marquess of Sonora—who commissioned the reconstruction and extension of the palace by the architect, Evaristo del Castillo. The building work was finished in 1828.

Its current form is built of granite, red brick and Colmenar stone. It consists of three floors with a lobby and a large branching staircase and a main courtyard. There is a garage area at the back.

It was the headquarters of the Spanish Ministry of Justice.

It was recorded on the Spanish heritage register, Bien de Interés Cultural on 31 July 1995.
