= David Trullo =

Spanish visual artist and Photographer (born 1969)

- Born: 1969 (age 56–57); Madrid
- Known for: Photografie
- Notable work: Serie:"Coined", Museum Lazaro Galdiano
- Website: http://www.davidtrullo.com/

David Trullo (born 1969 in Madrid) is a Spanish visual artist and Photographer, he was artist in residence in the Irish Museum of Modern Art (2002) and selected in Backlight International Triennial for Photography, Tampere, Finland (2005).

The recurrent themes in his photographic and video work are gender identity and the exploration of the uses of iconography. His work also frequently deals with the interpretation of the traditional subjects of art history. He has participated in art fairs and festivals such as Arco (feria de arte), Estampa and Photo España in Spain and Art Miami and The Armory Show in the United States. In 2006 the Museo Lazaro Galdiano, Madrid, showed Trullo's "Coined", a photographic series composed of hundred portraits of friends and acquaintances of the artist, all represented in profile, in the manner of Roman emperors, following the style of commemorative medals and coins. The 96 portraits correspond in number to the list of emperors from Augustus to Romulus Augustus.

In 2016 he published together with Pablo Peinado the book : Una historia verdadera, a collection of photographs about women and men who decided to portray themselves together at some point in their lives.

== Exhibitions (Solo Shows) ==
- 2011 Una Historia Verdadera, Instituto Cervantes Palermo, Italy.
- Festival Teruel Punto Photo, Teruel, Spain
- 2010 Una Historia Verdadera , Fundación FIART, Madrid., Spain
- 2009 Monumento, Galería Espacio 48, Santiago de Compostela, Spain
- Rituales, Capilla del Castillo de Santa Catalina, Cádiz., Spain
- 2008 Ecce Homo, Q! Galley, Glasgow, UK.
- 2007 Ecce Homme, Galería Rita Castellote, Madrid., Spain
- 2004 Héroes, Centro Municipal de las Artes, Alcorcón, Madrid.
- Vierzehnheiligen, Galleria Magenta 52, Milán, Italy.
- 2003 Ropa Interior, Galería Larra 10, Madrid.
- Vivos y Muertos, Galería Carmen de la Guerra, Madrid.
- 2001 Memorabilia, C.C. La Canela, Cádiz.
- Better Youth, Galería Carmen de la Guerra, Madrid.
- 1999 Le Bois Humain, Estampa 99, Madrid.
- Pink Spasm, Galería Carmen de la Guerra, Madrid.
- 1995 Crédito, Sala El Foro, Pozuelo de Alarcón, Madrid.

== Books ==
- David Trullo: Heroes, Editor: Alcorcón, Madrid, 2004
- David Trullo, Pablo Peinado: Una verdadera historia, Ed: Coleccion libre, 2016, ISBN 978-84-16491-56-8
- David Trullo: Familias y más, Ed: Fundación Caixa Galicia, 2008, OCLC: 433955396
- Roberto Gónzalez Fernández, David Trullo, Jesús Grironés: Works 2005-2007 : Sebas, meetings, planetas y satélites ... :
