= Palin (game) =

Traditional Mapuche game

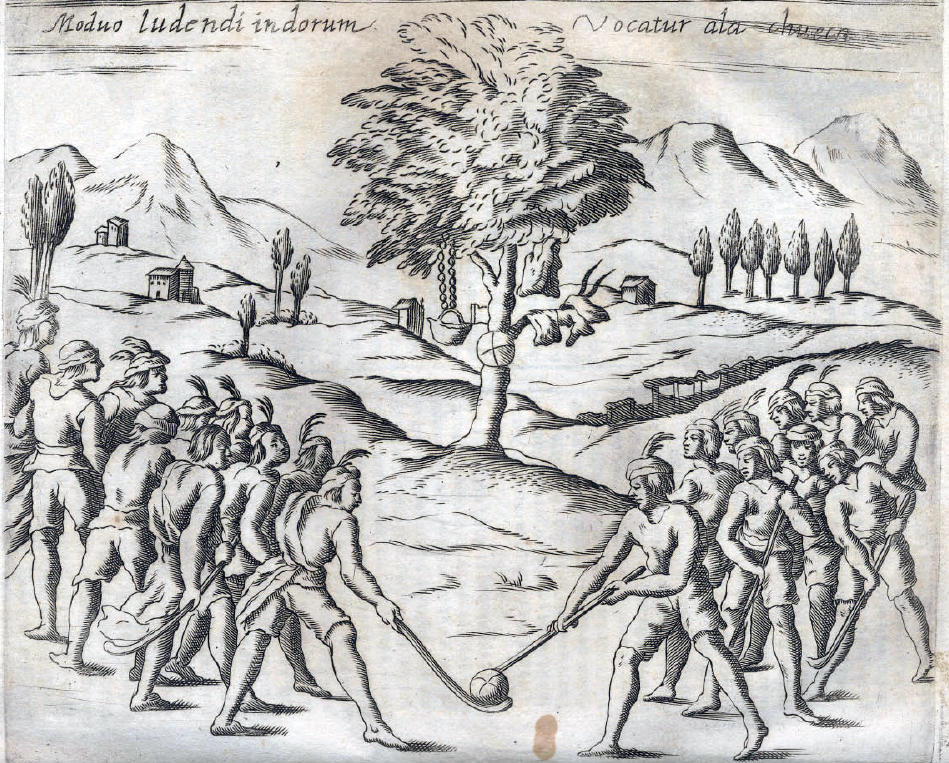
A 1646 drawing of Mapuches playing palin, from Histórica Relación del Reyno de Chile by Alonso de Ovalle

Palin (Mapuche: palin, Spanish: palín) is a traditional game of the Mapuche people of South America. It is broadly similar to field hockey, with two teams using sticks to move a ball across a goal line defended by their opponents. The Spanish conquistadors called it chueca, because it resembled a Spanish game of that name. Palin is the only pre-Columbian Mapuche game that has survived into the present day.

== History ==
Nineteenth-century scholars, such as Chilean historian Diego Barros Arana, believed that the Spanish had introduced the game of chueca to the Mapuche. However, more recent scholarship indicates that palin was already widely played by the Mapuche when the Spanish first conquered the region, and was most likely an ancient indigenous custom that the Spanish named after the similar game from their own homeland.

Prior to the arrival of the Spanish, palin was often played for ritual purposes or as preparation for warfare. Because of these associations, the Spanish colonial government of Chile repeatedly banned palin during the 17th and 18th centuries, but it was revived when Chile gained independence in the early 19th century. In more recent times it has been played primarily as a recreational sport, although some communities still hold palin games as a ritual for special occasions and other social gatherings.

== Description ==
Palin is played by two opposing teams on a long, narrow, rectangular field on flat ground. Exact dimensions vary, but a typical field would be 200 meters long and 12 meters wide. The number of players on the teams can vary, as long as both teams are of equal size.

Play begins with a wood or leather ball placed in the center of the field. Players use curved wooden sticks to move the ball down the long axis of the field and across the goal line on the opposing team's side. Score is kept as the difference in goals between the two teams. Each goal is worth one point, and when the trailing team makes a goal, a point is deducted from the score of the team in the lead. A team must score four consecutive unanswered points to win a game.

Players often make strong physical contact as they maneuver for control of the ball; injuries during a game are common.
