= Centro (Madrid) =

District of Madrid, Spain

Coordinates: 40.415347°N 3.707371°W

- District
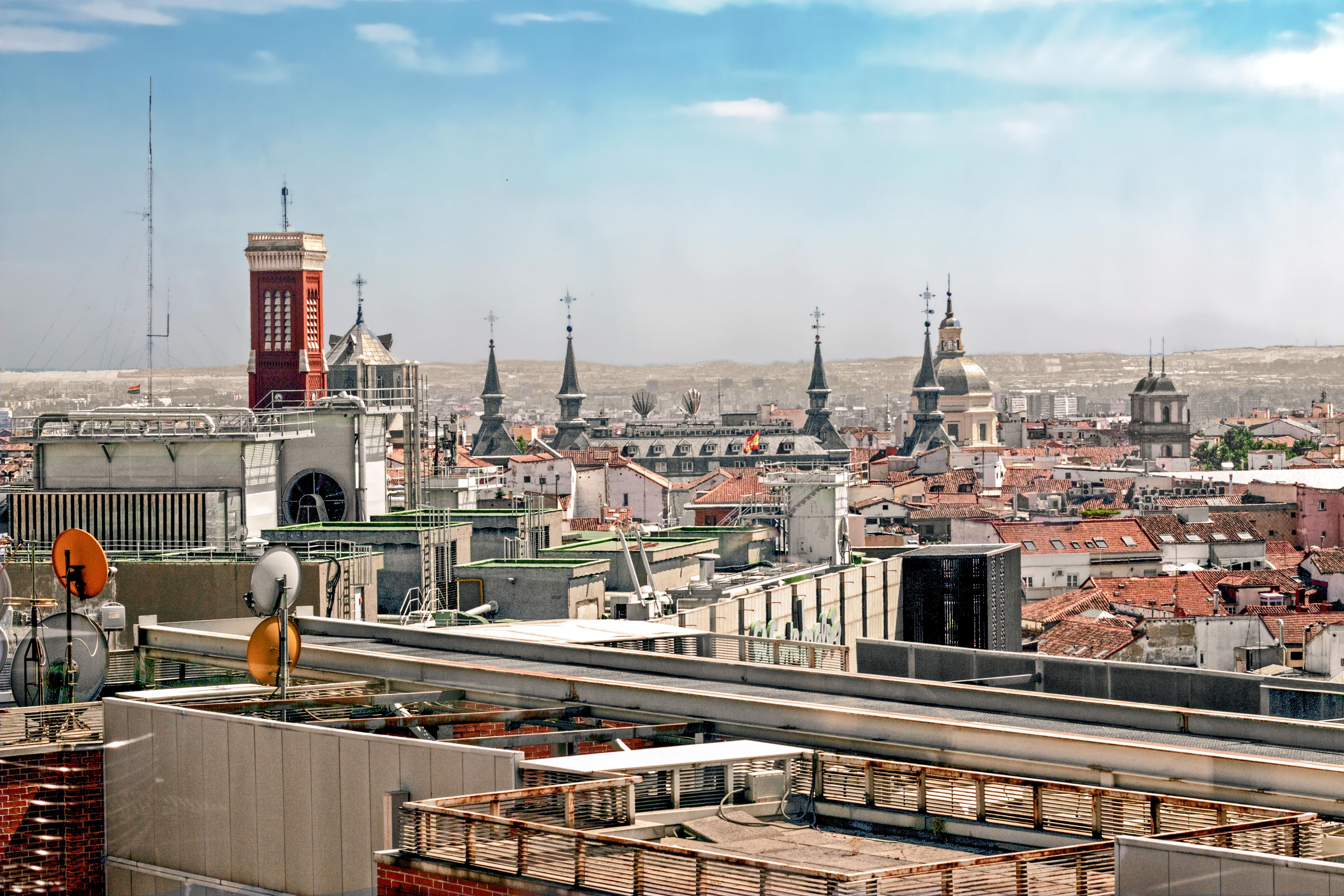
- Interactive map of Centro
- Country: Spain
- Aut. community: Community of Madrid
- Municipality: Madrid

Government
  - Councillor-President: Carlos Segura Gutiérrez (PP, 2023)

Area
  - Total: 5.23 km^{2} (2.02 sq mi)

Population
  - Total: 149,718
  - Density: 28,587/km^{2} (74,040/sq mi)
- Postal code: 28032

Centro ([ˈθentɾo], "Centre") is a district of Madrid, Spain. It is approximately 5.23 km^{2} (2.02 sq mi) in size. It has a population of 149,718 people and a population density of 28,587 people/km^{2} (74,040 people/mi^{2}). It roughly corresponds to the bulk of the housing formerly enclosed by the so-called Walls of Philip IV. The district is made up of the neighbourhoods of Cortes, Embajadores, Justicia, Universidad, Palacio and Sol.

== History ==
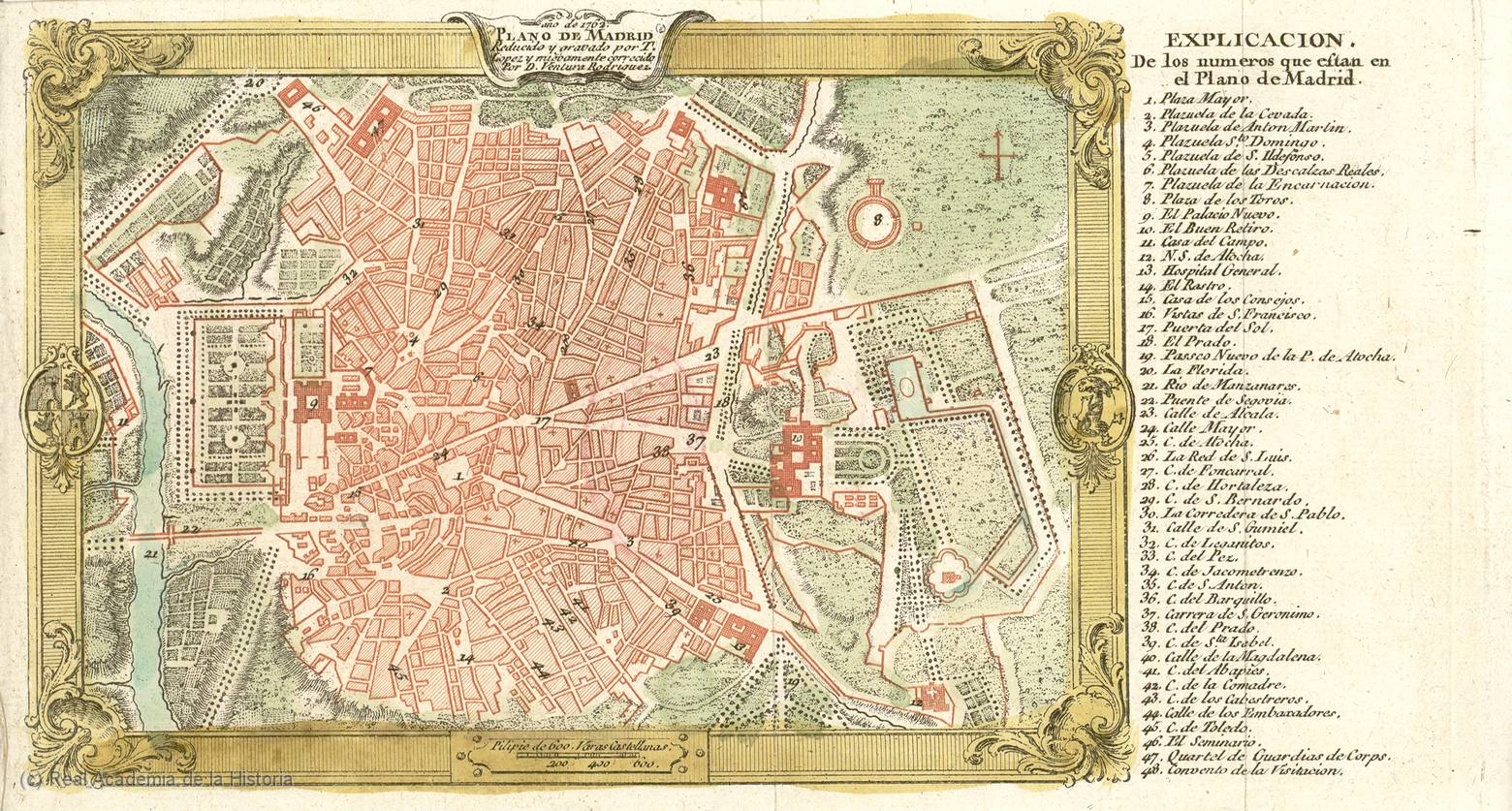
Before the 19th century, Madrid (by and large the current-day Centro District plus the Jerónimos neighborhood that includes the Buen Retiro Park) was enclosed by the Walls of Philip IV.

The Centro district of Madrid is the oldest section of the city. Evidence of a stable settlement dates back to Spain's Muslim period. In the second half of the 9th century, the emir of Córdoba, Muhammad I (852–886), built a fortress on a promontory beside the river, the modern-day location of the Royal Palace. Its purpose was to watch the passes of the Sierra de Guadarrama and to initiate raids against the northern Christian countries. The remaining ruins of the fortress's wall are still preserved. A small suburb called Magerit developed to the east of the fortress. With the exception of the wall, few structures from this period remain.

The city passed into Christian hands in 1085, prospering into a town by 1123. Philip II chose to place his court in Madrid in 1561, ensuring the swift evolution of the town. Many of the older buildings and monuments of the region known as El Madrid de los Austrias are from this period.

The Bourbon kings, especially Carlos III, fixated on converting Madrid into a great capital, using Paris as a model. This resulted in substantial investments in the infrastructure of the city, especially sewage and public buildings.

In the 19th and 20th centuries, with the arrival of democracy, the city continued to grow. The reign of Isabella II saw the construction of the Congress of Deputies building, in Puerta del Sol.

The district currently houses the central government of the Community of Madrid, in Puerta del Sol. Until 2007, the City Council of Madrid was also located here, in Plaza de la Villa. At present it is located in Cybele Palace, in the district of Retiro.

== Administrative neighborhoods ==
Division of administrative neighborhoods in the Centro district

Administratively, the district is divided into 6 neighborhoods (barrios):

- Cortes
- Embajadores
- Justicia
- Universidad
- Palacio
- Sol

== Places of interest ==
Other informal neighborhoods and locations in the district are:

- Los Austrias
- Barrio de las Letras
- Chueca
- Conde Duque
- La Latina
- Lavapiés
- Malasaña
- Salesas
- Puerta del Sol
- Royal Palace of Madrid
- Plaza Mayor
- Gran Vía
- Plaza de España
- Plaza de Colón
- Paseo del Prado
- Plaza de Cibeles
- Plaza de Santa Ana

== Culture ==
The Centro district holds celebrations for several local festivals: San Antón on 17 January, "Dos de Mayo" on 2 May, San Antonio on 13 June, and Virgen de la Paloma on 15 August.

== See also ==
- Districts of Madrid
