= Palacio (Madrid) =

Ward of Madrid in Spain

Coordinates: 40°24′54″N 3°42′48″W

- Ward of Madrid
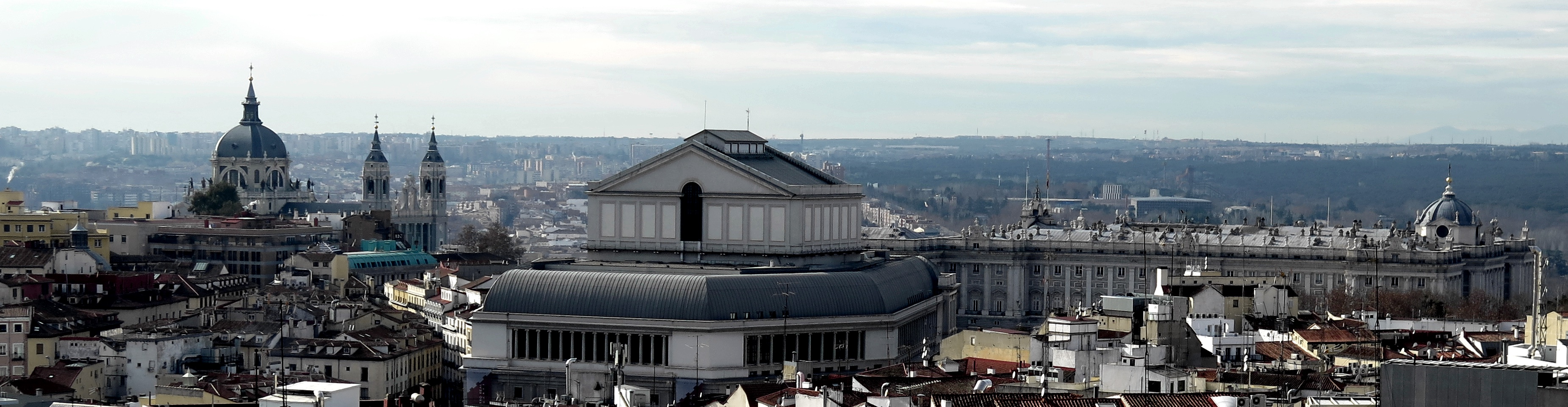
- Country: Spain
- Autonomous community: Madrid
- Municipality: Madrid
- District: Centro

Palacio is an administrative ward (barrio) of Madrid, Spain, belonging to the district of Centro.

It contains the historic neighborhoods of La Latina and El Madrid de los Austrias.
