= Architecture of Madrid =

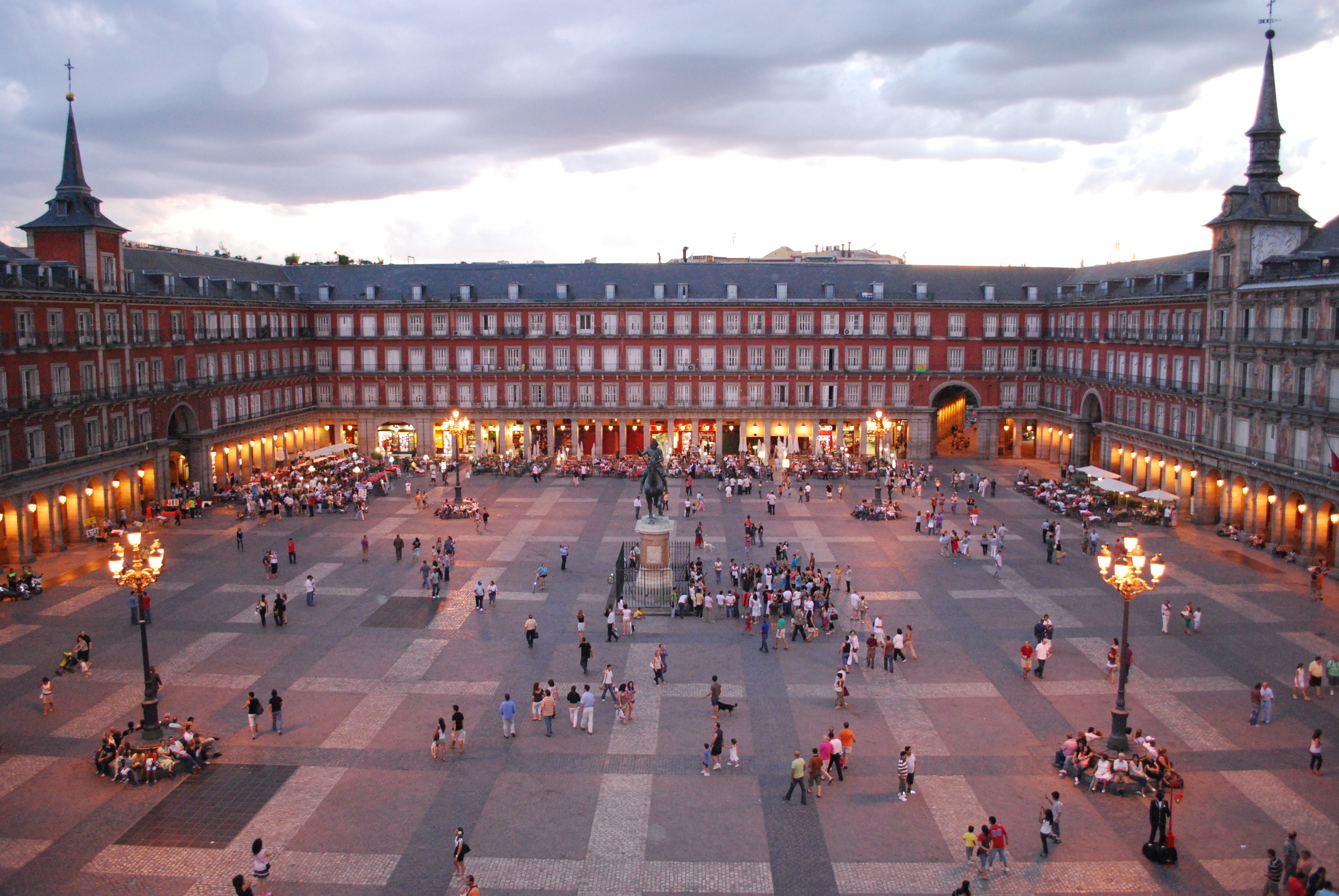
Plaza Mayor

The architecture of Madrid has preserved the look and feel of many of its historic neighbourhoods and streets, even though Madrid possesses a modern infrastructure. Its landmarks include the Royal Palace of Madrid, the Royal Theatre with its restored 1850 Opera House, the Buen Retiro Park (founded in 1631), the 19th-century National Library building (founded in 1712) containing some of Spain's historical archives, a large number of national museums, and the Golden Triangle of Art located along the Paseo del Prado and comprising three art museums: Prado Museum, the Reina Sofía Museum, and the Thyssen-Bornemisza Museum, which completes the shortcomings of the other two museums. Cibeles Palace and Fountain have become the monument symbol of the city.

The architecture of Madrid reflects a number of styles from various historical periods.

== Medieval and Renaissance period ==
Very little medieval architecture is preserved in Madrid, and most of it is located inside the Almendra Central. Historical documents show that the city was walled and had a castle (the Alcázar) in the same place where the Royal Palace now stands. Among the few preserved medieval buildings are the mudejar towers of San Nicolás and San Pedro el Viejo churches, the palace of Luján family (located in the Plaza de la Villa), the Gothic church of St. Jerome, part of a monastery built by the Catholic Monarchs in the 15th century, and the Bishop's Chapel.

Nor has Madrid retained many examples of Renaissance architecture, except for the Cisneros house (one of the buildings flanking the Plaza de la Villa), the Bridge of Segovia and the Convent of Las Descalzas Reales, whose austere exterior gives no idea of the magnificent art treasures inside.

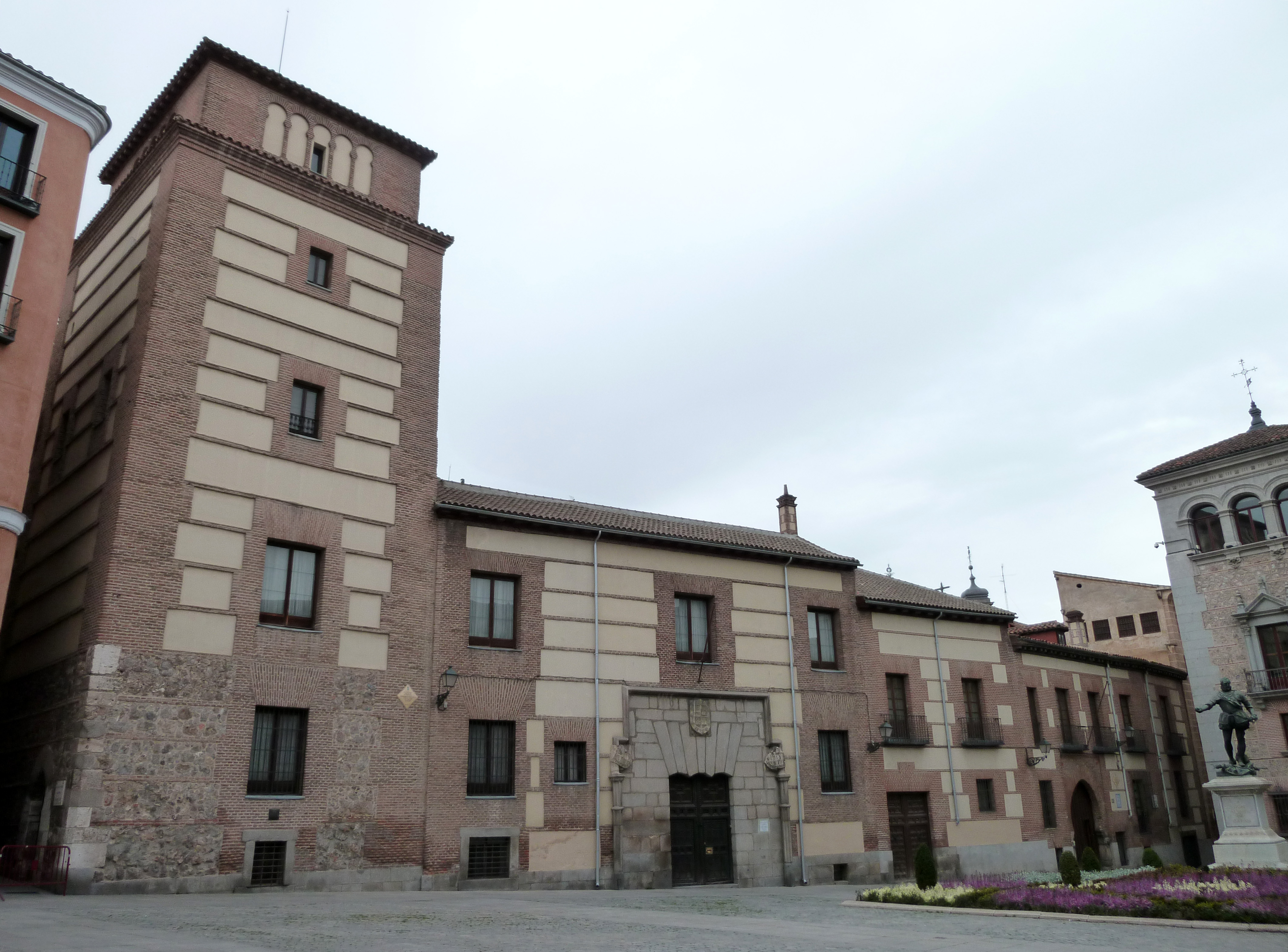
Casa de los Lujanes

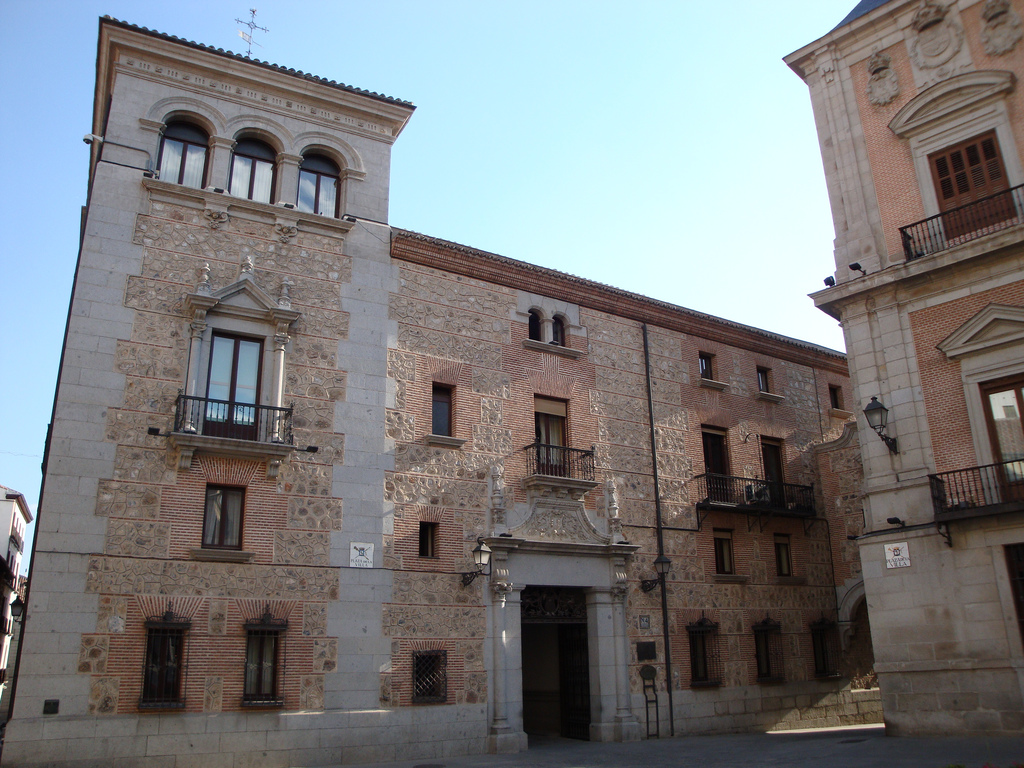
Casa de Cisneros

== Habsburgs transform Madrid into a capital city ==
When Philip II moved his court to Madrid in 1561, a series of reforms began, reforms that aimed to transform the town into a capital city worthy of the name. These reforms were embodied in the Plaza Mayor, designed by Juan de Herrera (author of El Escorial) and Juan Gómez de Mora, characterized by its symmetry and austerity, as well as the new Alcázar, who would become the second most impressive royal palace of the kingdom.

Many of the historic buildings of Madrid were built during the reign of the Habsburgs. The material used was mostly brick and the humble façades contrast with the elaborate interiors. Juan Gómez de Mora built notable buildings such as Casa de la Villa, Prison of the Court, the Palace of the Councils and Royal Convent of La Encarnación. The Buen Retiro Palace was a vanished work by Alonso Carbonel, today on the grounds of the Buen Retiro Park, with beautiful rooms decorated by the best artists in times of Philip IV (Velázquez, Carducci, Zurbarán). Imperial College become an important institution run by the Jesuits, and the model dome of the church would be imitated in all Spain, thanks to the cheap materials used in its construction.

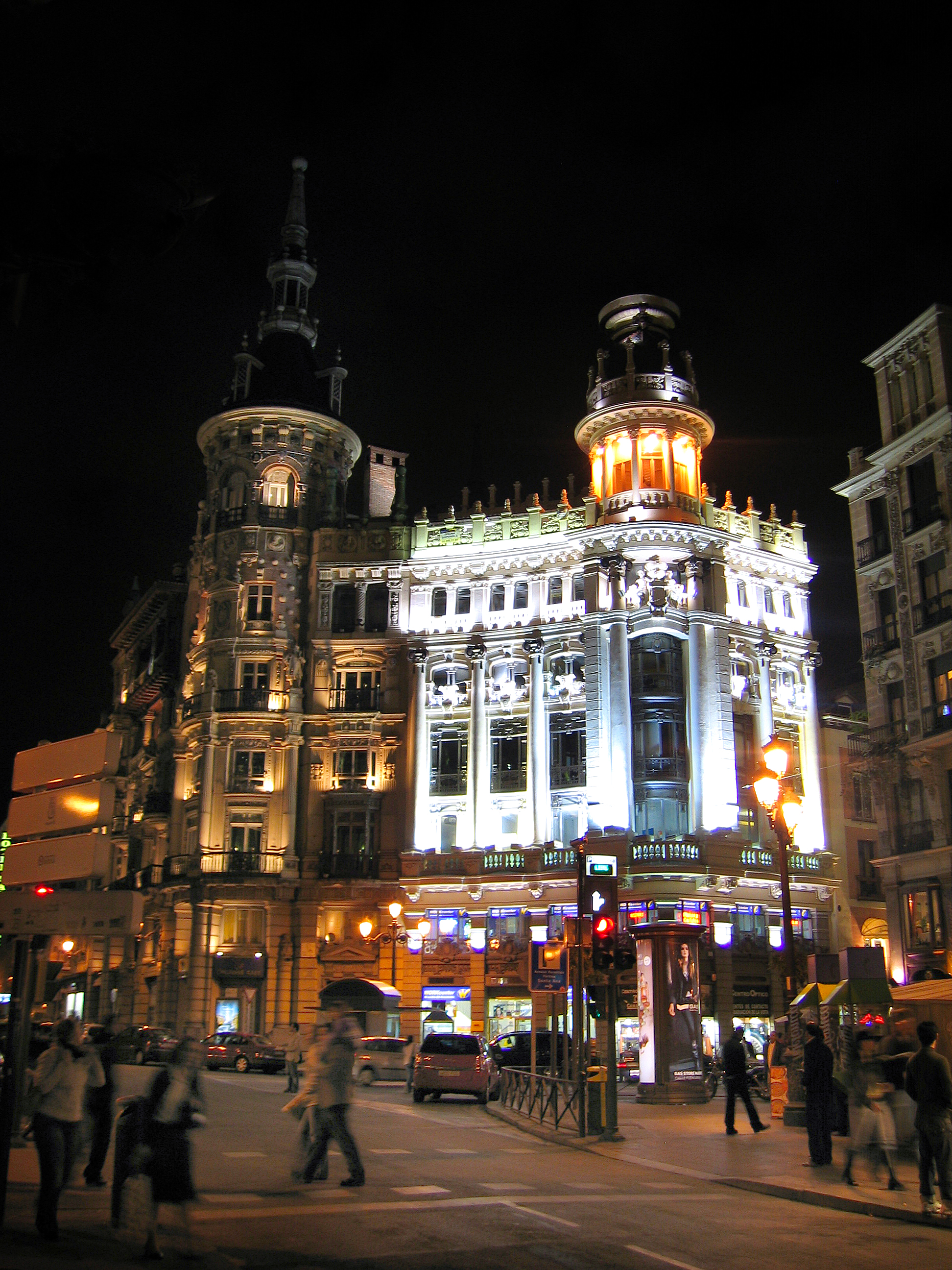
Canalejas Square

Pedro de Ribera was one of the most important architects in Madrid of the pre-Bourbon era. Ribera introduced Churrigueresque architecture to Madrid, characterized by ornamental overload on their covers, as an altarpiece. The History Museum, the Cuartel del Conde-Duque, the church of Montserrat and the Bridge of Toledo are the best examples.

== The Bourbons ==
The arrival of the Bourbons marked a new era in the city. Ruins of the burned Alcazar of Madrid was replaced by the grand Royal Palace of Madrid commissioned by the first Spanish Bourbon, Philip V of Spain, a palace more in line with the French taste. Filippo Juvarra, an architect specializing in the construction of royal palaces, was chosen to design the new palace. His design was inspired by Bernini's design rejected for the Louvre Palace in Paris. Juvarra died before the work began, and the project was substantially modified by his disciple Giovainni Battista Sacchetti. Philip V tried to complete the vision of urbanization of Madrid initiated by King Philip II, which included a bridge spanning a large ravine, linking The Royal Alcázar to the southern part of town. Philip V would never see the bridge even begin and neither would several of his successors. It wasn't built until the 19th century and is called the Segovia Viaduct. Other buildings of the time were the St. Michael's Basilica and the Church of Santa Bárbara.

King Charles III of Spain was more interested in beautifying the city. He was an enlightened monarch and endeavored to convert Madrid into one of the great European capitals. He pushed forward the construction of the Prado Museum (designed by Juan de Villanueva). The building was originally intended to serve as a Natural Science Museum. Charles III was also responsible for design of the Puerta de Alcalá, the Royal Observatory (Juan de Villanueva), the Royal Botanic Gardens, the Basilica of San Francisco el Grande (Francesco Sabatini), the Casa de Correos in Puerta del Sol, the Real Casa de la Aduana (Francesco Sabatini) and the General Hospital by Sabatini (now houses the Reina Sofia Museum and Royal Conservatory of Music). The Paseo del Prado, surrounded by gardens and decorated with neoclassical statues inspired by mythological gods, is an example of urban planning. The Duke of Berwick ordered Ventura Rodríguez the construction of the Liria Palace.

Subsequently, the Peninsular War, the loss of colonies in the Americas, and the continuing coups prevented the city from developing interesting architecture (Royal Theatre, the National Library of Spain, the Palace of the Senate and the Congress). In the slums of Madrid during this time, a kind of substandard house was developed that today has a special historical charm: an example is the corralas, which currently still exist in the neighborhood of Lavapiés.

== Modernization ==
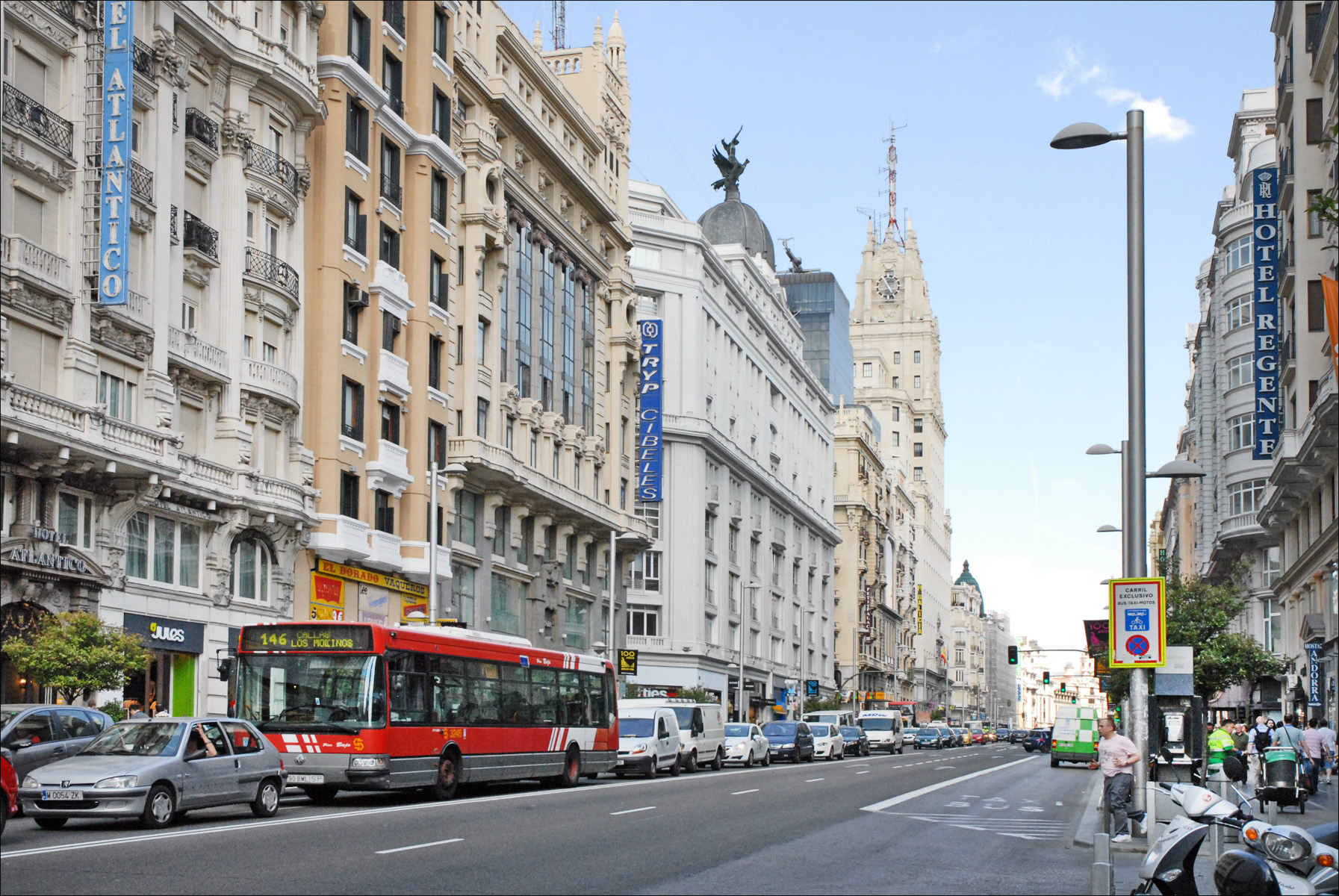
The Gran Vía showcases patterns ranging from Vienna Secession style, Plateresque, Neo-Mudéjar, Art Deco and others

From the late 19th century until the Civil War, Madrid modernized and built new neighborhoods and monuments, both in the capital and in neighboring towns. In the mid-19th century the expansion of Madrid developed under the Plan Castro, resulting in the neighborhoods of Salamanca, Argüelles and Chamberí. Arturo Soria conceived the linear city and built the first few kilometers of the road that bears his name, which embodies the idea. Ricardo Velázquez Bosco designed the Crystal Palace and the Palace of Velázquez in the Retiro Park. Secundino Zuazo built the Palace of Music and the Casa de las Flores. The Bank of Spain was designed by Eduardo Adaro and Severiano Sainz de la Lastra. Meanwhile, the Marquis of Cubas began the Almudena Cathedral project, which was to be a neo-Gothic church with neo-Romanesque cloister. Alberto de Palacio designed Atocha Station. Las Ventas Bullring was built in the early 20th century, as the Market of San Miguel (Cast-Iron style). Finally, Delicias Railway Station is the oldest example of this kind of infrastructure according to the model of Henri de Dion.

The Neo-Mudéjar was a widely spread style in Madrid in the 19th century; sometimes combined with Gothic revival, it was captured in religious buildings such as the Church of San Fermín de los Navarros or the Church of la Paloma as well as in civil ones.

The last decade of the 19th century brought a Nationalist reaction in Architecture, represented in two revival styles: the neo-plateresque and the neo-baroque. José Urioste Velada and José López Sallaberry were stand-out architects of the neo-plateresque. The former was the author of a number of monumental gates and following his comeback from Paris, many private houses, while the latter was the author of the Blanco y Negro Building at Serrano Street. While chiefly developed in the early 20th century in Madrid, the neo-baroque was some of the last examples of 19th-century revivalist architecture. Some exponents of the style were Eduardo Reynals and Juan Moya Idígoras.

Modernismo (the Spanish expression of Art-Nouveau) was introduced in Madrid in the early 20th century, first with a timid nod in iron balconies (such as the house of Tomás y Salvany) and then with markedly modernista buildings such as the José Grases Riera's Palacio Longoria or the Manuel Medrano's House of the Marquise of Villamejor.

Antonio Palacios, described by Fernando Chueca as the "most powerful figure in the Spanish architecture of the first third of the 20th century and the most difficult figure to label and fit under conventional parametres", left an unavoidable imprint in the city architectural history, building a series of eclectic buildings. Some examples are the Palace of Communication (Palacio de Comunicaciones), the Fine Arts Circle of Madrid (Círculo de Bellas Artes) and the Río de La Plata Bank.

Selection of works by Palacios in Madrid

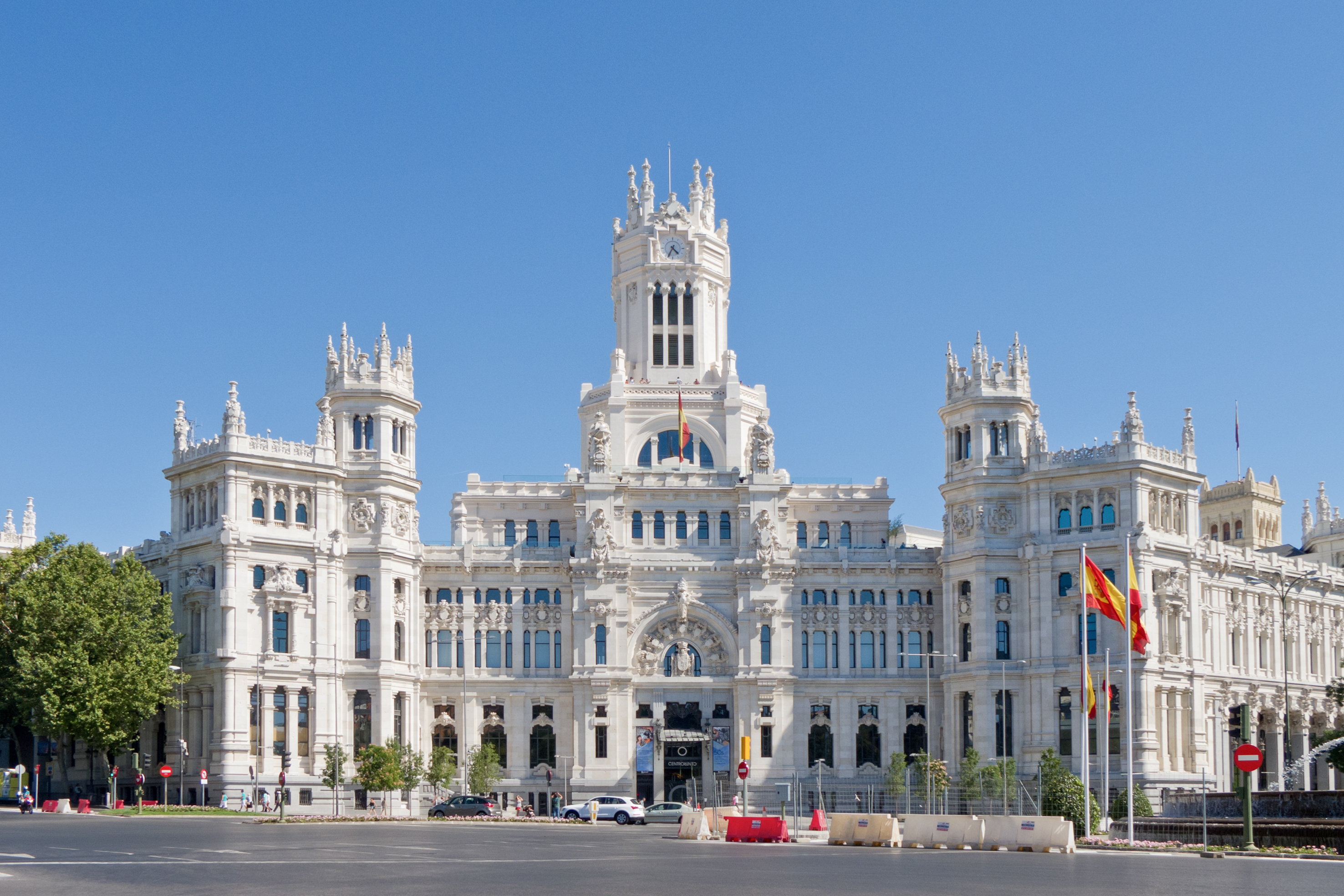
The Palacio de Comunicaciones

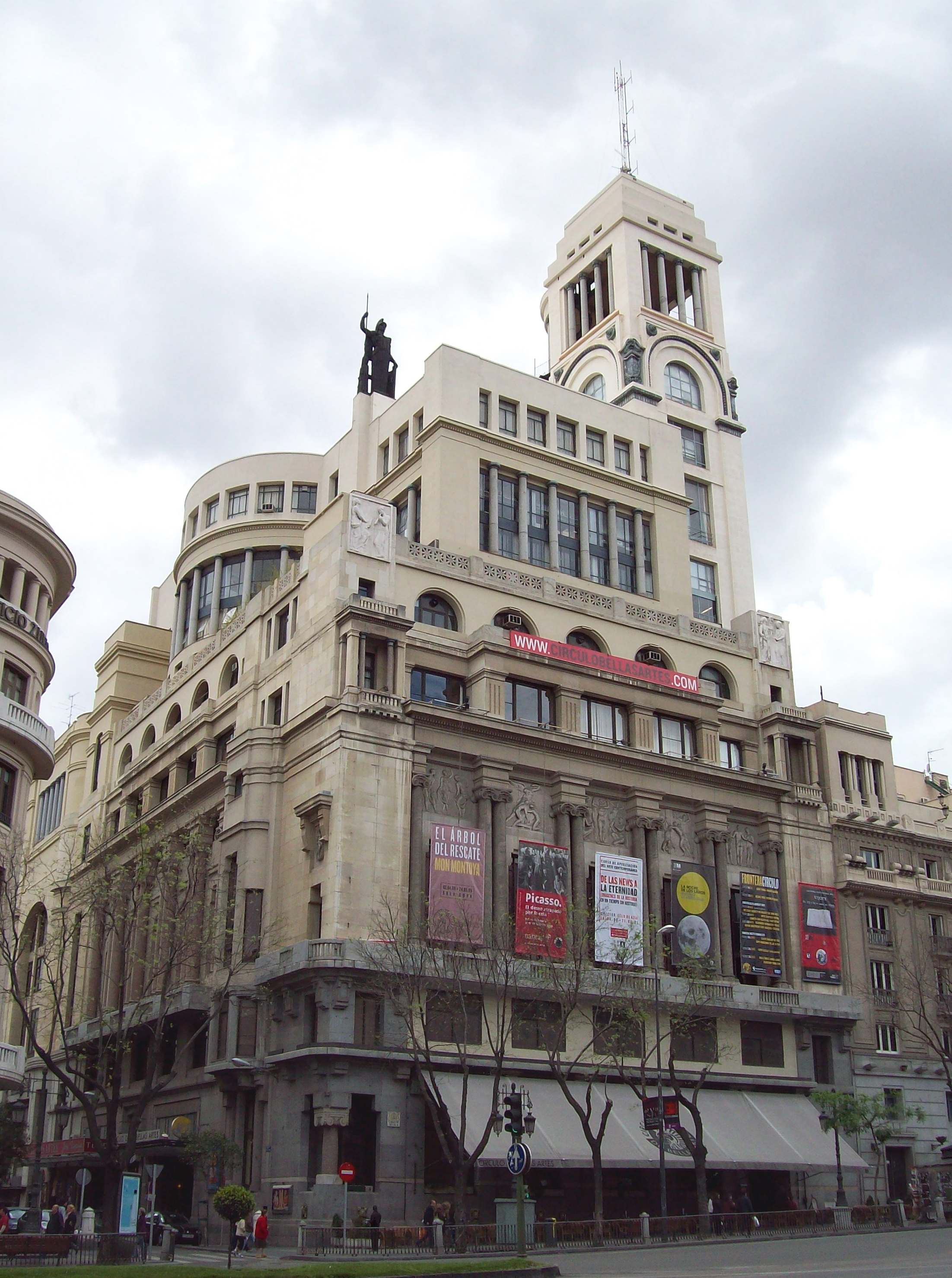
The Círculo de Bellas Artes

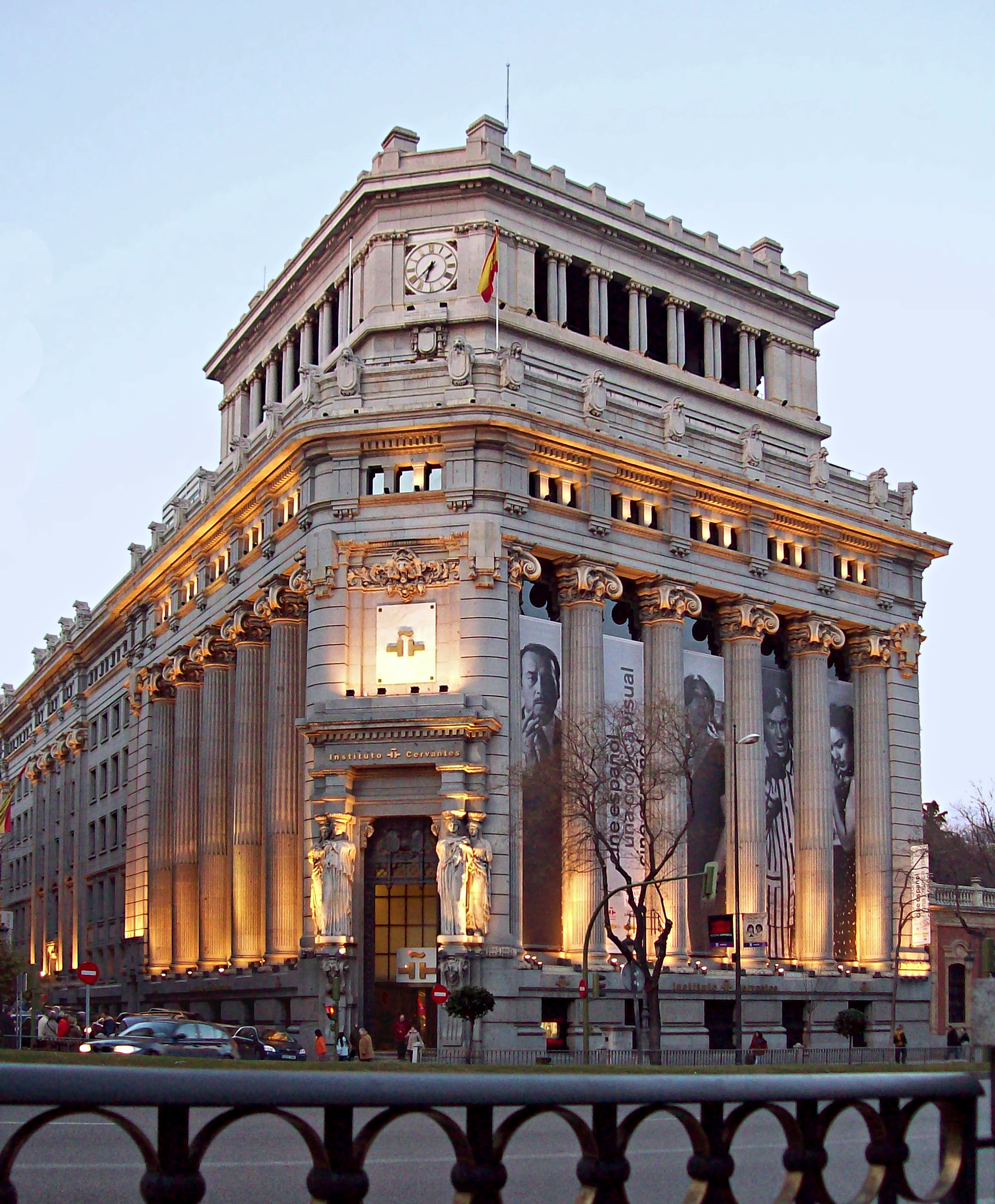
Banco del Río de la Plata

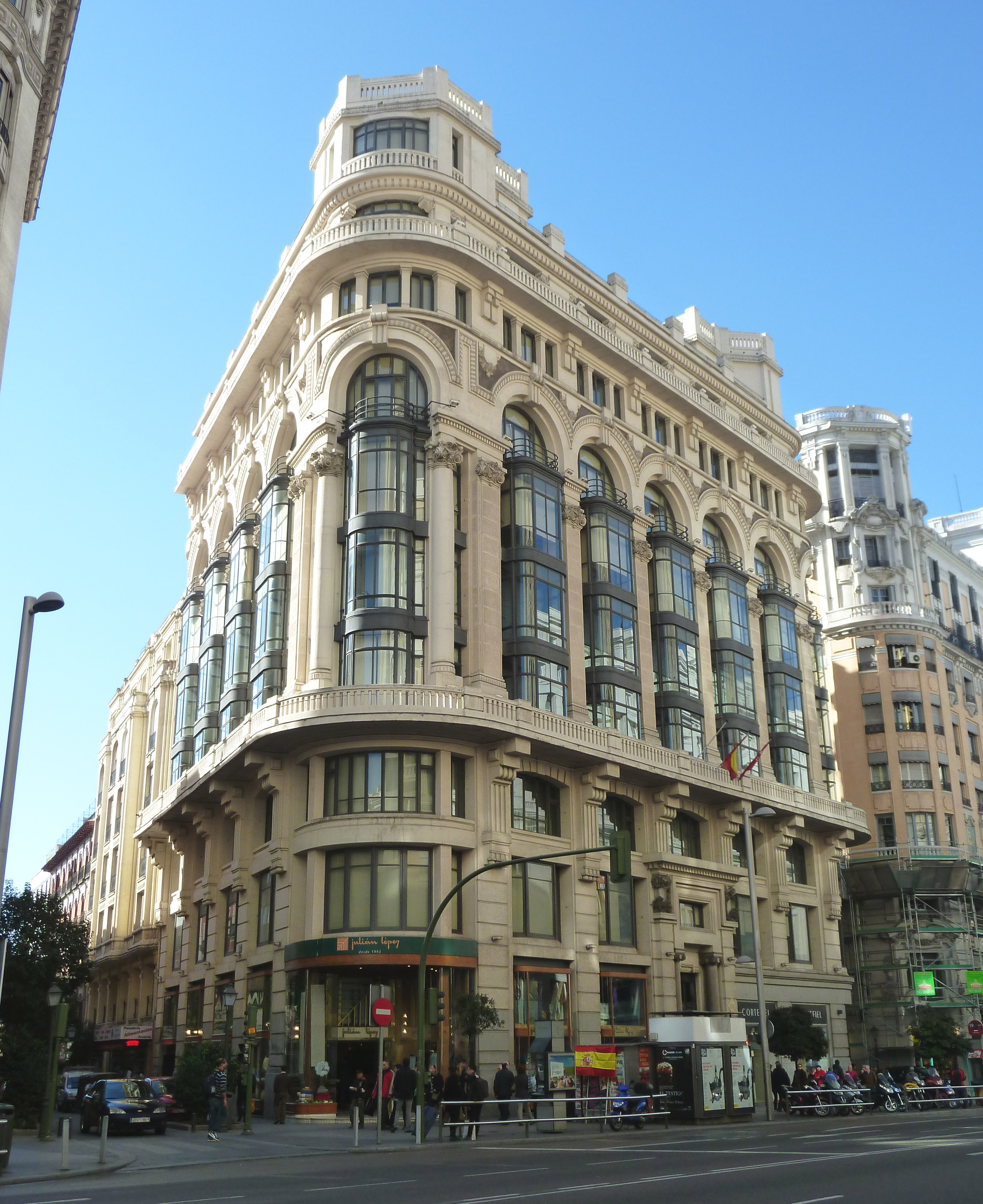
Casa Matesanz

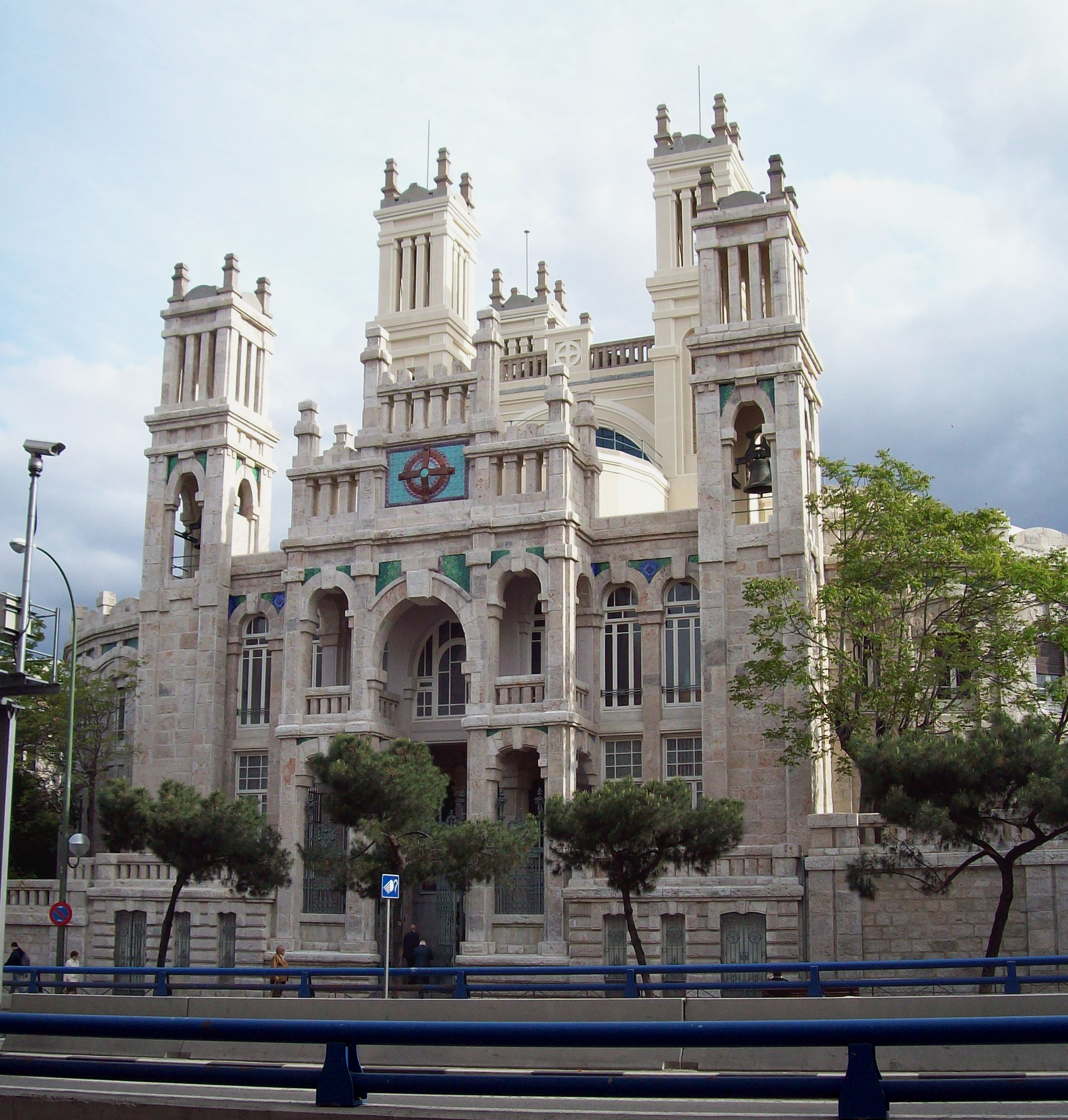
Hospital de Maudes

Also the construction of Gran Vía began in the early 20th century, with the task of freeing the old town. They used different styles that evolved over time: The Metropolis building is built in French style and the Edificio Grassy is eclectic, while Telefónica Building is art deco, with baroque ornaments. The Carrión (or Capitol) Building is expressionist, and the Palace of the Press, another example of art deco.

The Banco Bilbao was a notable case of late eclecticism in the 1920s, while the Palacete Cort and the Cine Doré were examples of late Secession in the city.

Modesto López Otero, adept to historicist lines, projected the notable La Unión y el Fénix Español building, influenced by North-American architects practicing the Mission Style in vogue by that time in the United States.

The 1936–1939 Civil War interrupted the road to Modernity.

== Francoist dictatorship ==
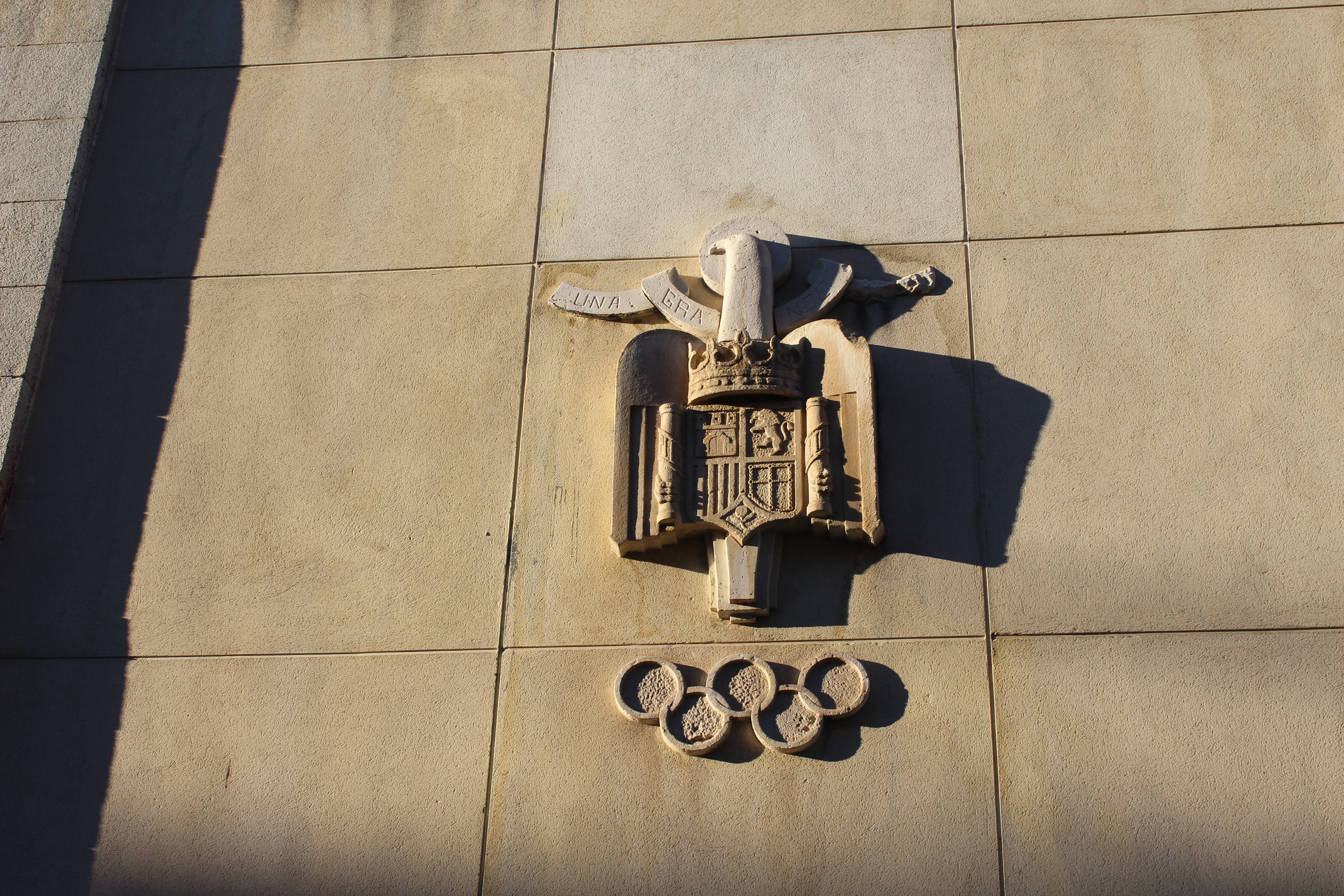
Detail in the façade of the Moscardó Gym

Soon after the entry of the Francoist troops in Madrid signalling the end of the war, the new Mayor exhorted to the Madrilenians not to rest until Madrid became the "capital worthy of the New Spain, One, Great and Free, of the Imperial Spain forged by the Generalísimo, by the Armed Forces, by the militias, and by the rearguard, through the means of steel, through the means of blood, and through sacrifices.

Already in June 1939, a meeting of the Assembly of Architects presided by prominent Falangist architect Pedro Muguruza convened in Madrid, and a document about the General ideas on the National Plan for Planning and Reconstruction was delivered later in the year, setting the lines of the immediate post-war architecture. According to Pedro Bidagor, the author of the 1941 urban planning for the city, in the new regime there was no more "freedom before the State to do the works according the anyone's humour; there is no freedom between good and evil. Is it mandatory to perform up to maximum effort and endure maximum discipline to do things right". A Directorate-General for Architecture was created in September 1939 following totalitarian lines.

In the first years of the Francoist dictatorship, the regime adhered to some elements of the totalitarian architectural language, with a folkish mythification of the works of Juan de Herrera and Juan de Villanueva, captured in buildings such as the Luis Gutiérrez Soto's Ministry of the Air, reminiscent of El Escorial. During these years, in the Spanish case the reactionary and Catholic conservative matrix largely prevailed over a purely Fascist architecture in the sense of the Roger Griffin's established link between modernity and Fascism. The neo-herrerian style developed in the 1940s adapted in Spain the monumentality espoused by German and Italian fascist architectural styles, but it strayed from them in the sense that this style, very much looking to the past, remained far from the avant-garde. The Teatro Clara Eugenia, a building strikingly following the style of Nazi's official architect Albert Speer was nonetheless erected in 1943 on the current day district of Hortaleza.

Instances of Early Francoism's historicism

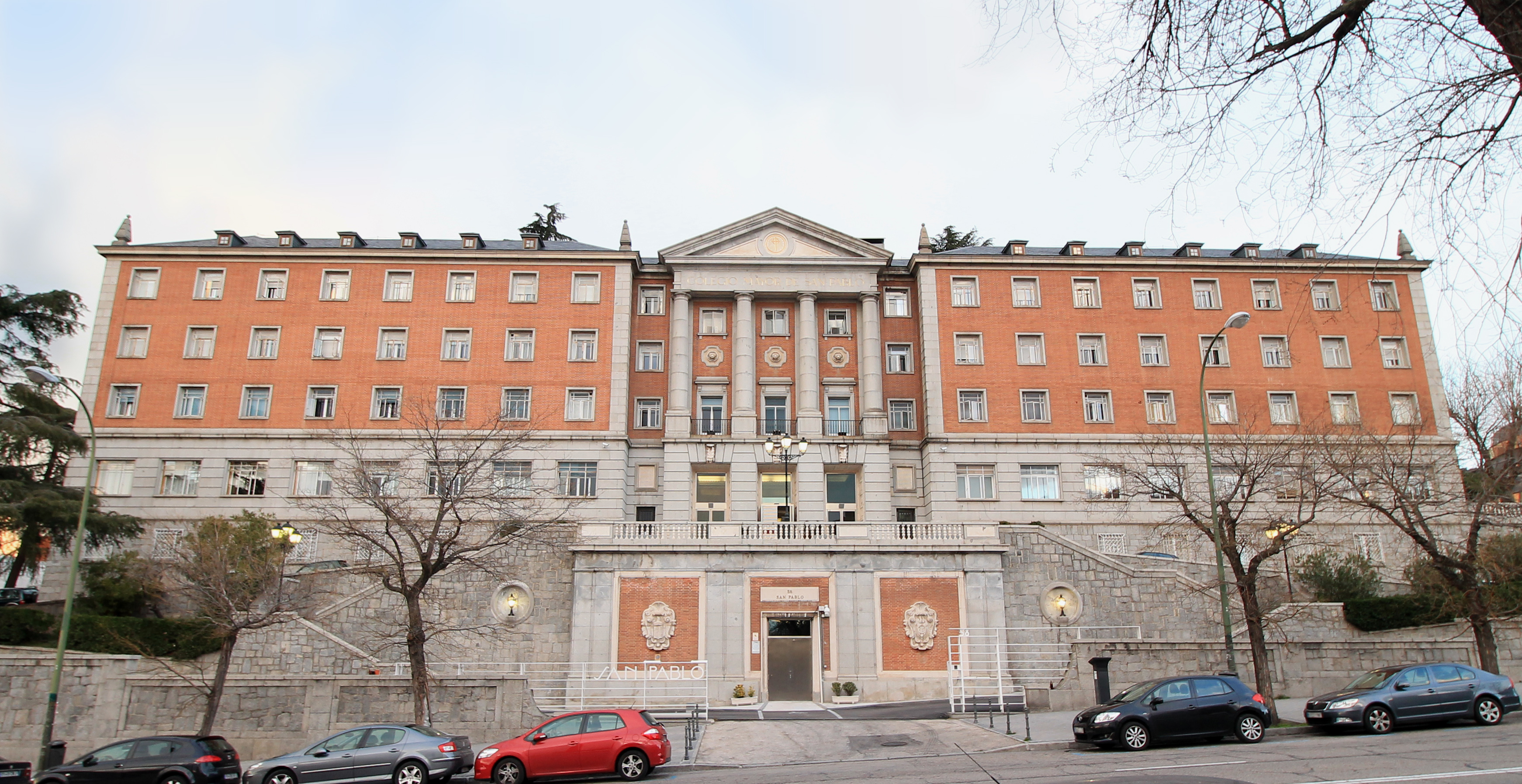
Colegio Mayor San Pablo

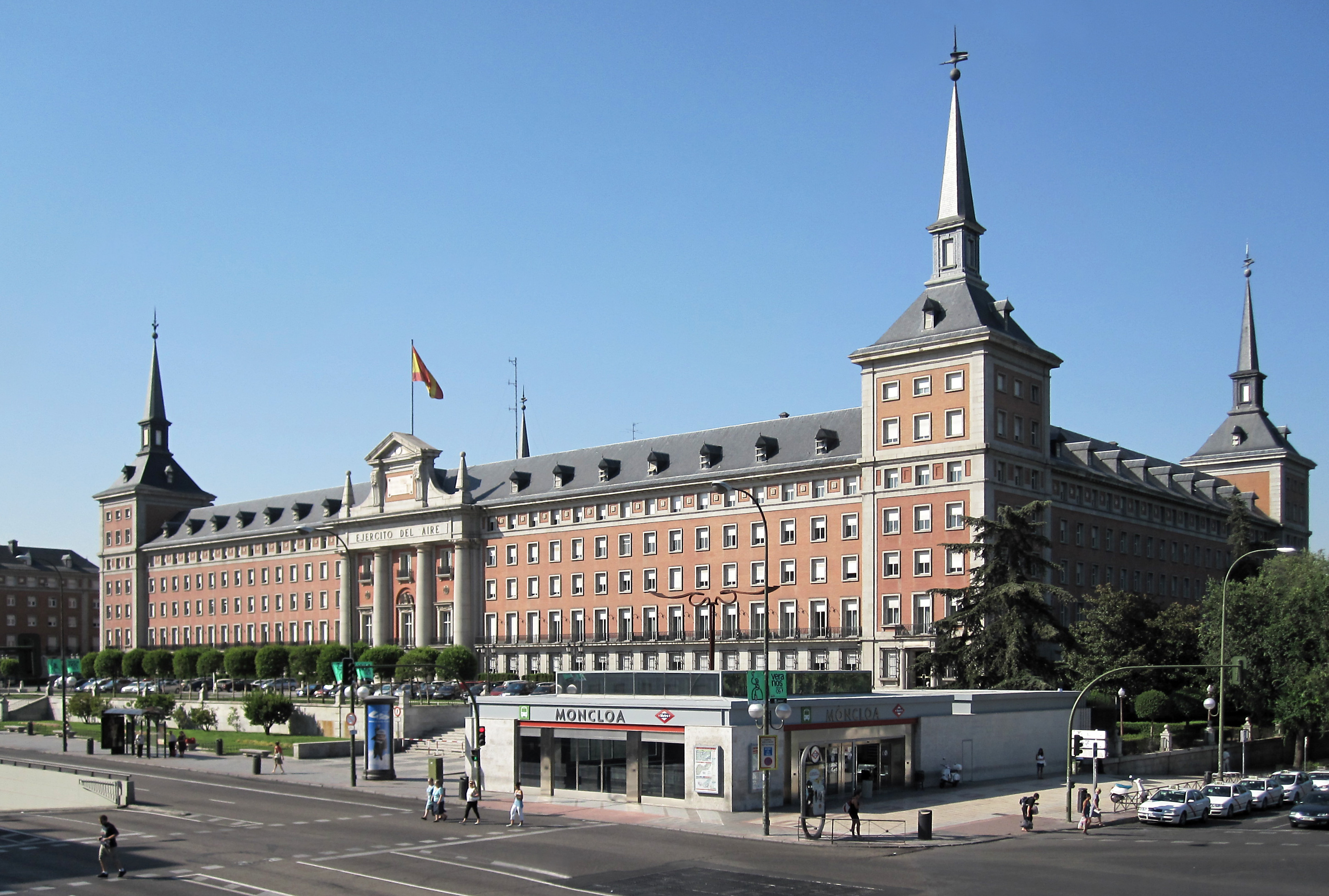
Ministry of the Air

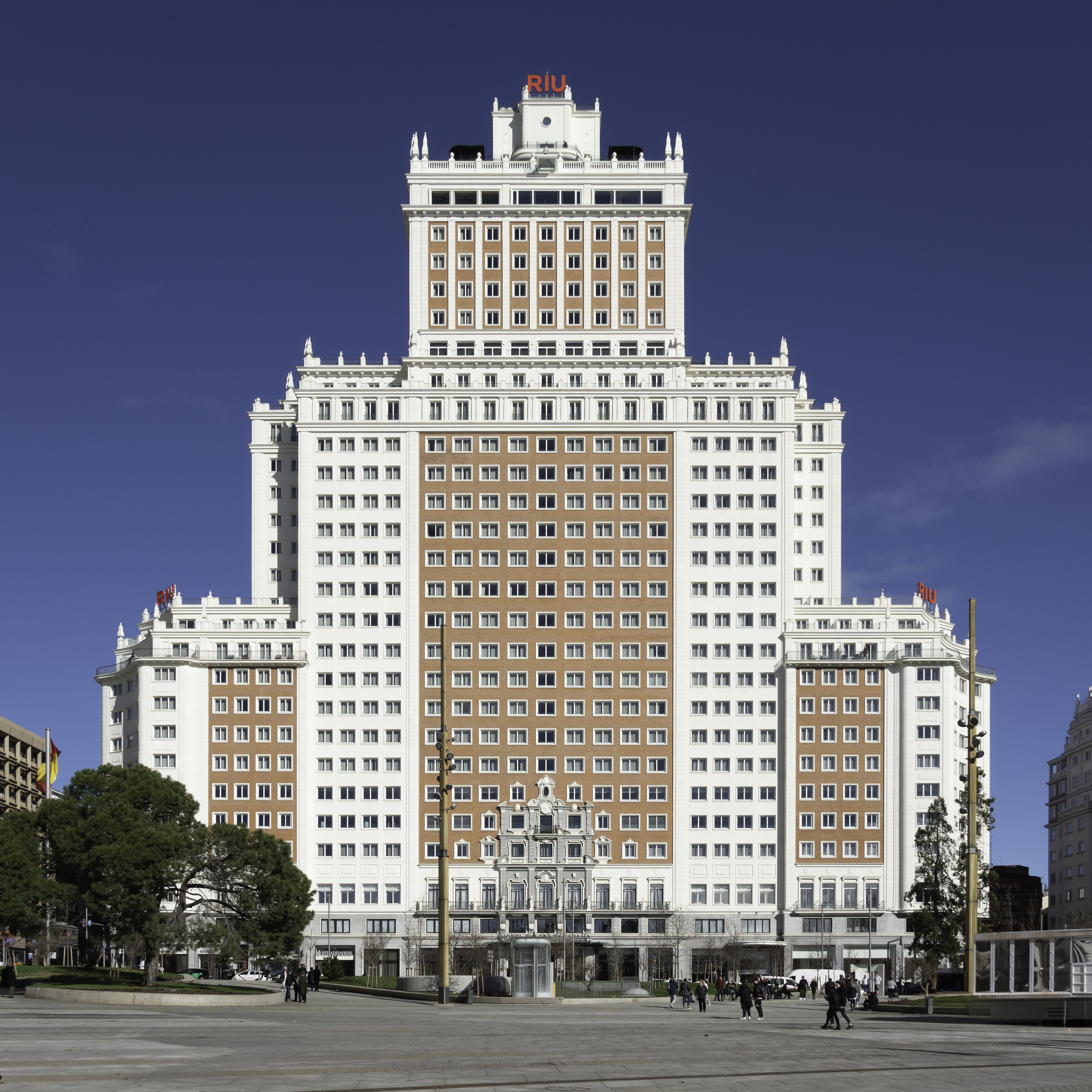
Edificio España

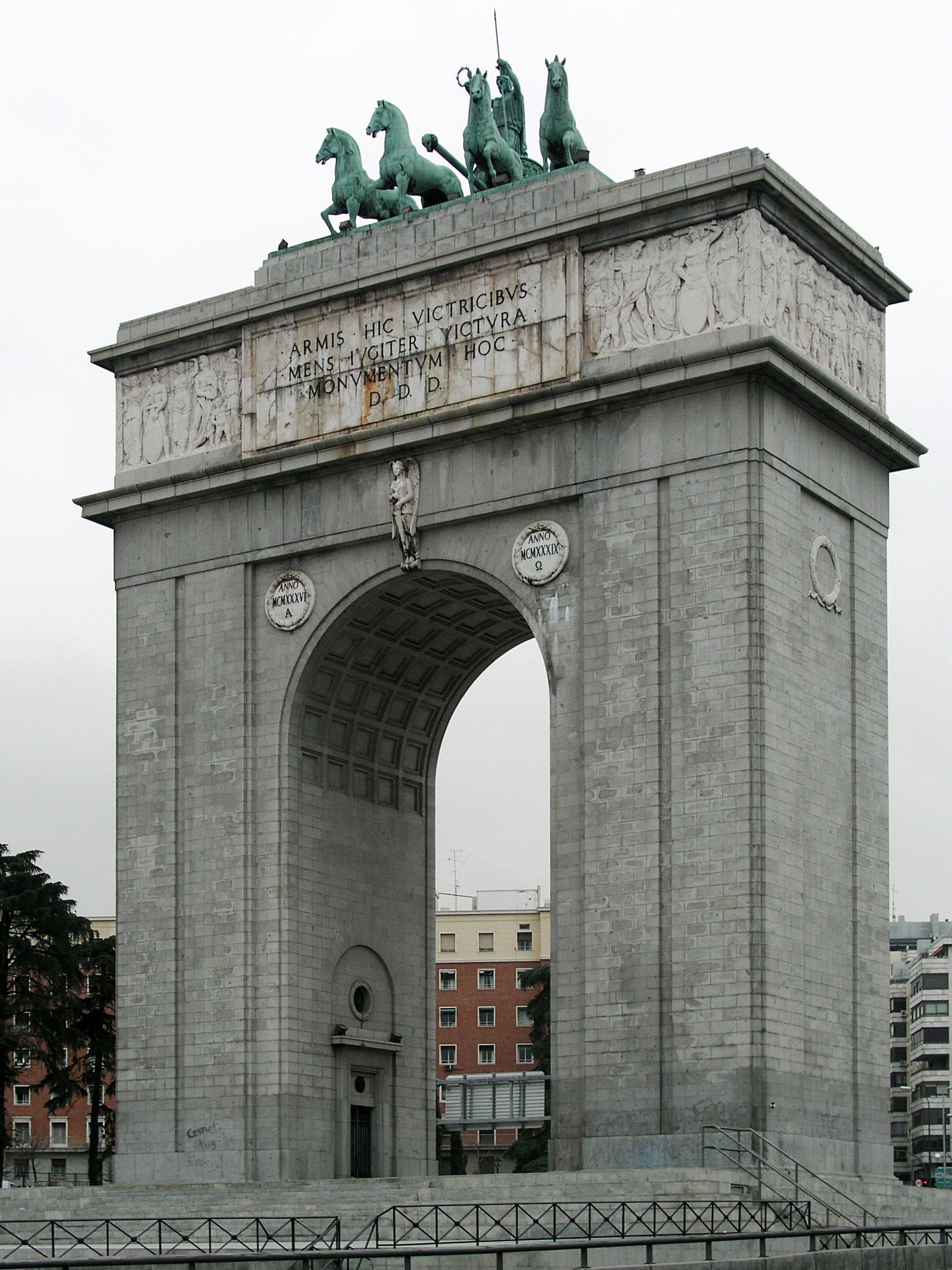
Arco de la Victoria

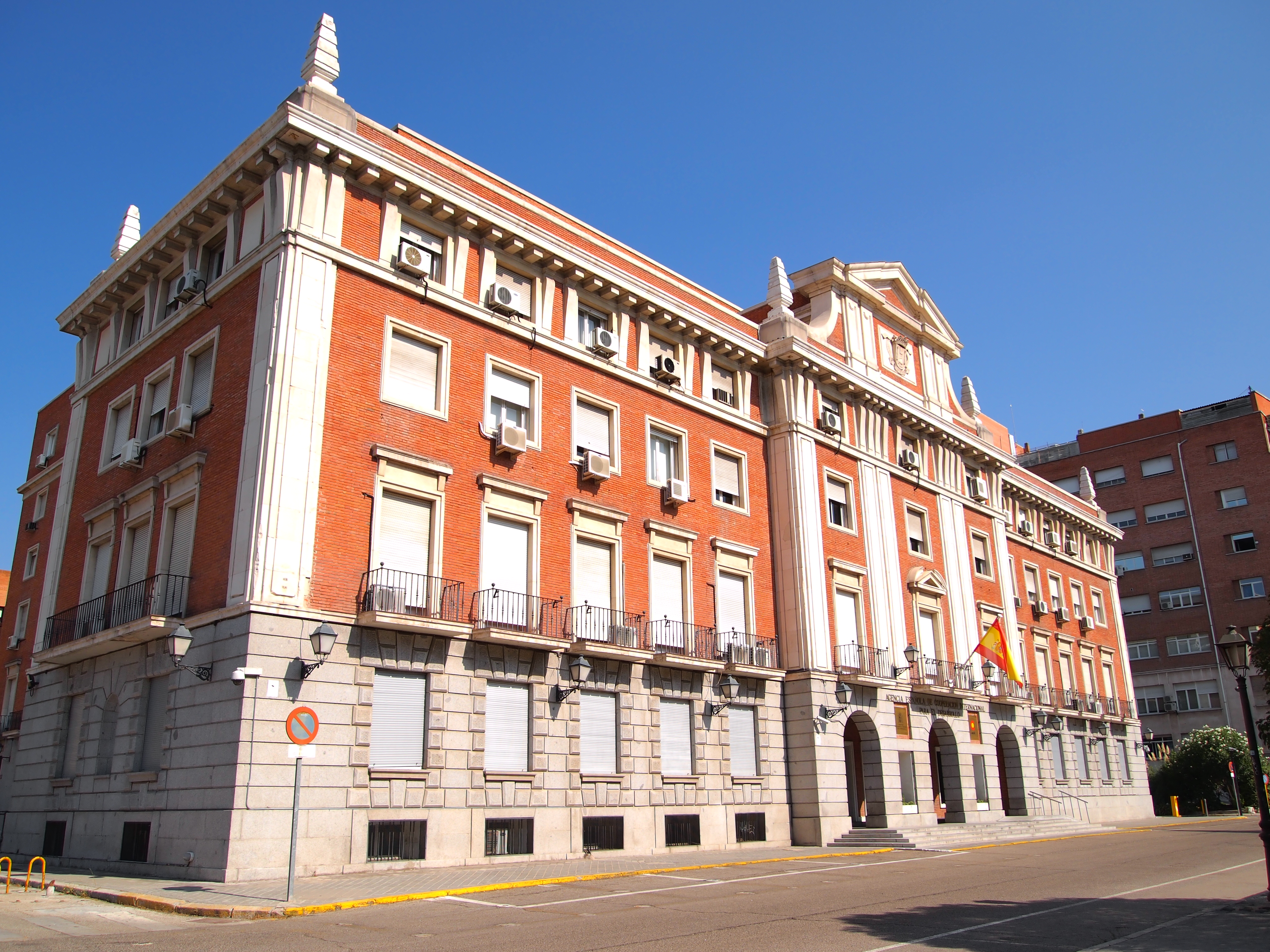
AECID headquarters

With the country ruined after the war, the Falange command had nonetheless high plans for the city and professionals sympathetic to the regime dreamed (based on an organicist conception) about the notion of building a body for the "Spanish Greatness" placing a great emphasis in Madrid, what they thought to be the imperial capital of the New State. In this sense, urban planners sought to highlight and symbolically put in value the façade the city offered to the Manzanares River, the "Imperial Cornice", bringing projects to accompany the Royal Palace such as the finishing of the unfinished cathedral (with the start of works postponed to 1950 and ultimately finished in the late 20th century), a never built "house of the Party" and many others.

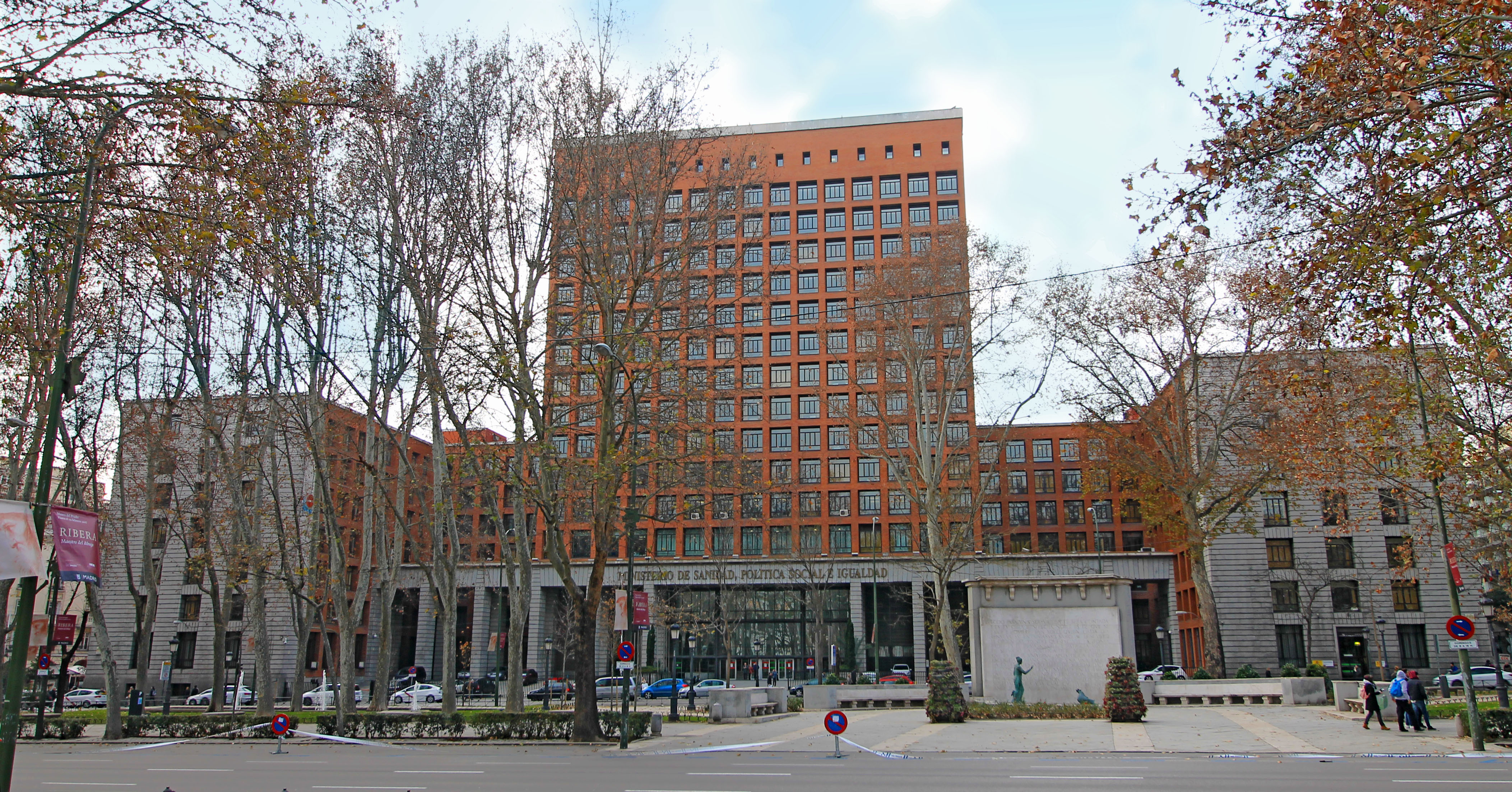
The Casa Sindical, often linked to the works of Giuseppe Terragni.

Nonetheless, these delusions of grandeur caught up with reality and the scarcity during the Post-War and most of the projects ended up either filed, unfinished or mutilated, with the single clear success being the Gutiérrez Soto's Cuartel del Ejército del Aire.

A sense of modernity was nonetheless later introduced at some point, with buildings such as the Cabrero & Aburto's Casa Sindical or the headquarters for the Alto Estado Mayor de la Defensa, by Gutiérrez Soto, that, particularly in the first case, decidedly broke with traditionalist historicism.

== Recent architectural developments ==
1992 was a marked year for Spain. However, the Capital of Culture Madrid celebrated in 1992 did not have the meaning the Universal Exposition and the Summer Olympics had for Seville and Barcelona, respectively, and the city was left with no lasting icon of the year. The most outstanding projects in the early 1990s were the reopening of the Museo Nacional Centro de Arte Reina Sofía (project by Antonio Fernández Alba) and the renovation of the Atocha Train Station (by Rafael Moneo).

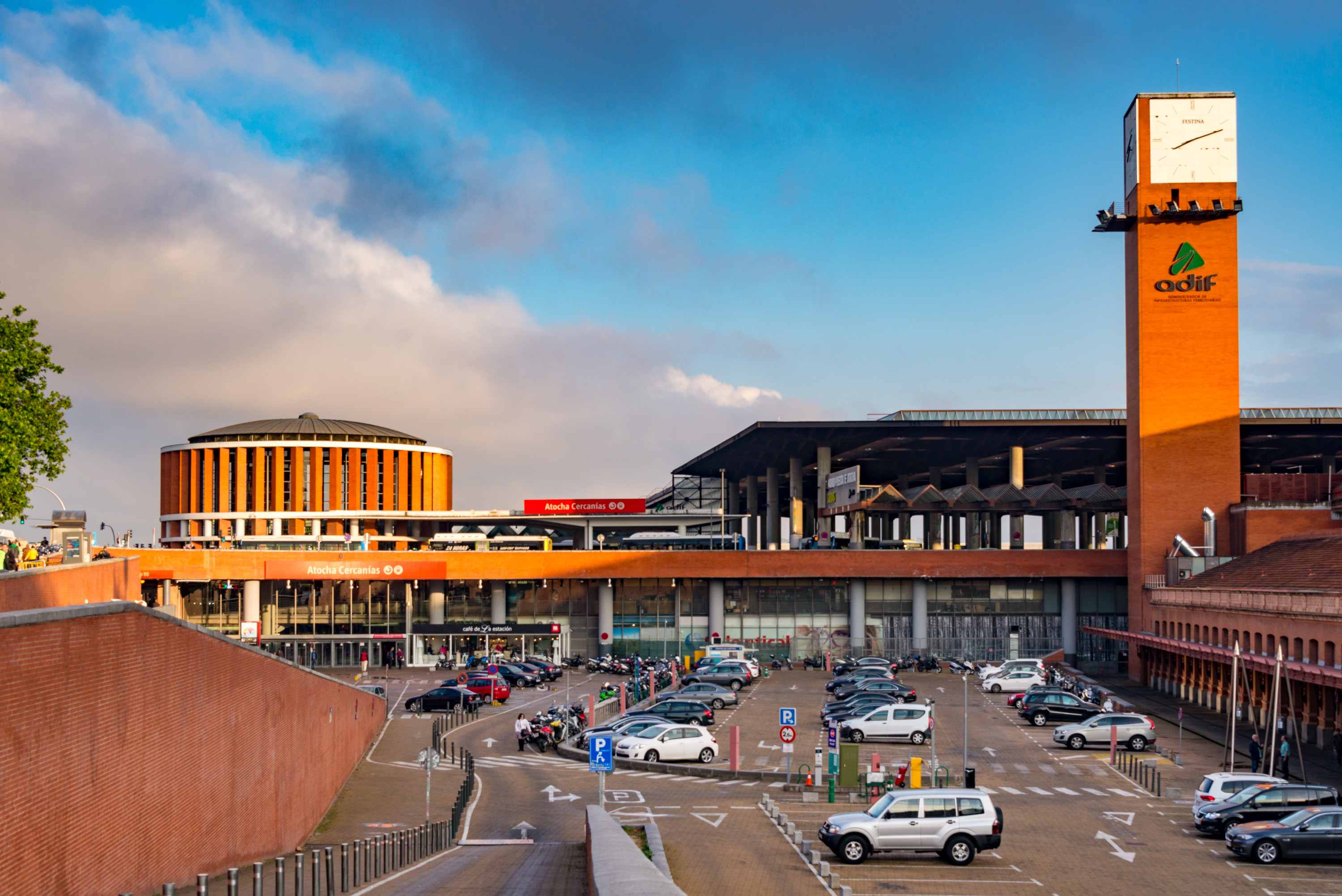
Expansion of Atocha by Rafael Moneo

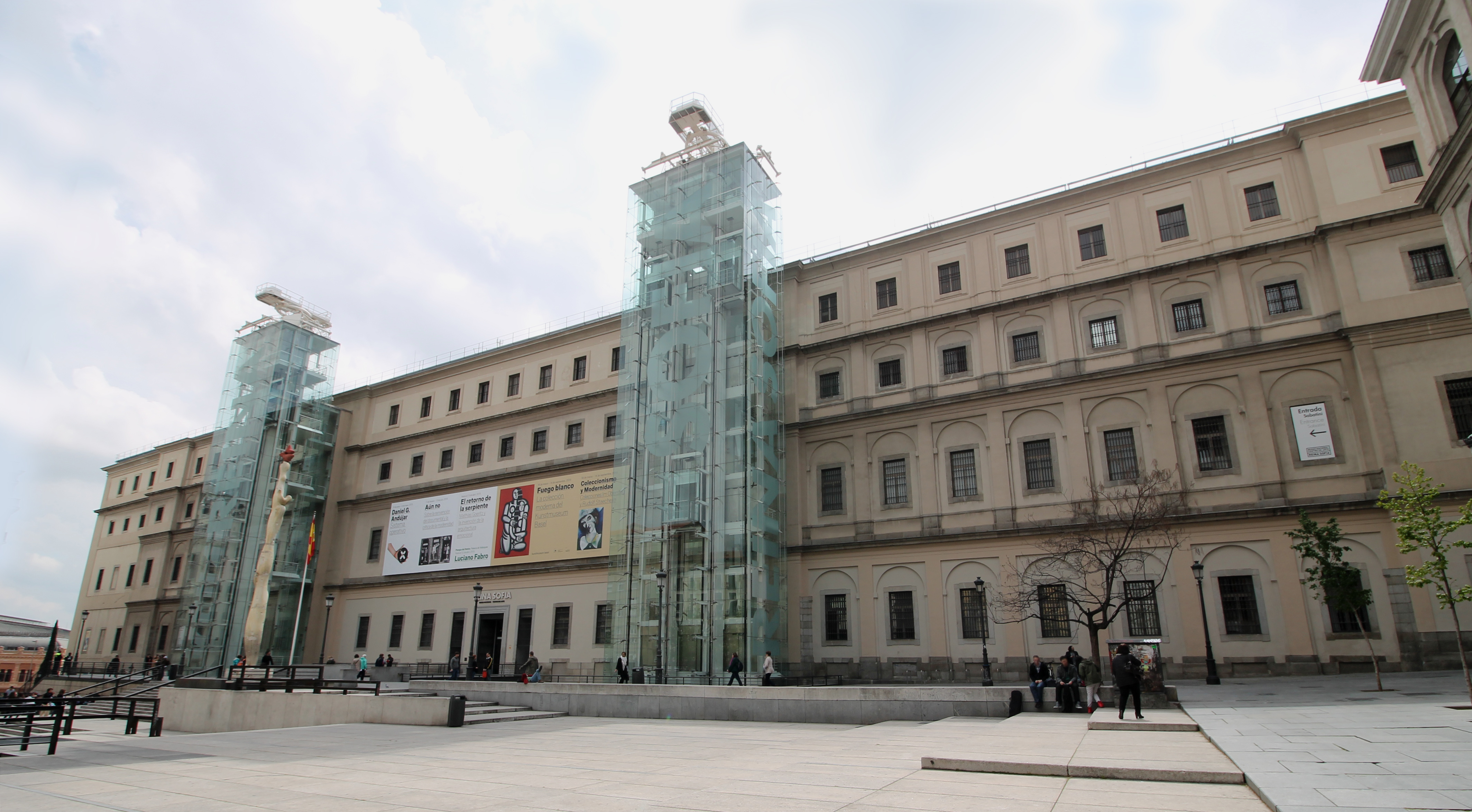
Elevators of the Reina Sofía Museum

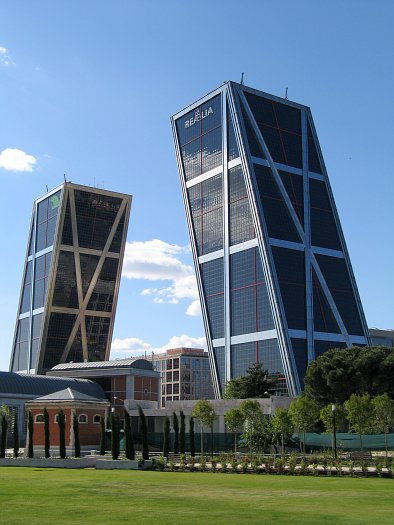
The Gate of Europe, completed in 1996, described as a perfect representation of "all that went wrong with Spain's rapid integration into capitalism".

In the last quarter of the 20th century skyscrapers appeared in the city such as Torre Picasso, designed by Minoru Yamasaki; Torres Blancas and Torre BBVA (both by Francisco Javier Sáenz de Oiza) and in the 1990s, the Gate of Europe, architects Philip Johnson and John Burgee. Moreover, in the 1990s construction was completed of the Cathedral of the Almudena. The National Auditorium of Music is a work of 1988.

In the 21st century, Madrid faces new challenges in its architecture. An old industrial warehouse is the Interpretation Centre of New Technologies, and the CaixaForum Madrid (Herzog & de Meuron) was a former power station.

Under the government of Alberto Ruiz-Gallardón the four tallest skyscrapers in Spain were built, and together form the Cuatro Torres Business Area (CTBA). The Manzanares river is crossed by new edge bridges, and work started on the International Convention Centre (Mansilla+Tuñón), an original round building, whose works remain paralyzed by the crisis. Caja Mágica (Dominique Perrault) sport centre was also built and the Reina Sofía Museum has been expanded with the help of Jean Nouvel.

Madrid Barajas International Airport Terminal 4, designed by Antonio Lamela, Richard Rogers and TPS Engineers, was inaugurated on 5 February 2006. Terminal 4 is one of the world's largest terminal areas, with an area of 760,000 square metres (8,180,572 square feet) in two separate terminals: a main building, T4 (470,000 square metres), and satellite building, T4S (290,000 square metres), which are separated by approximately 2.5 km (2 mi). The new terminal is meant to give passengers a stress-free start to their journey. This is managed through careful use of illumination, available by glass panes instead of walls and numerous domes in the roof which allow natural light to pass through. With the new addition, Barajas is designed to handle 70 million passengers annually.

Madrid Nuevo Norte is a long-delayed venture to reshape a significant portion of the northern central part of the city, with a focus on Chamartín railway station and surrounding areas. The project's current iteration includes several skyscrapers, a new Metro line, and a large-scale revaluation of neglected and disused land, with most of Chamartín's railway tracks to be moved underground. As of July 2020, construction works are scheduled to begin in 2021.

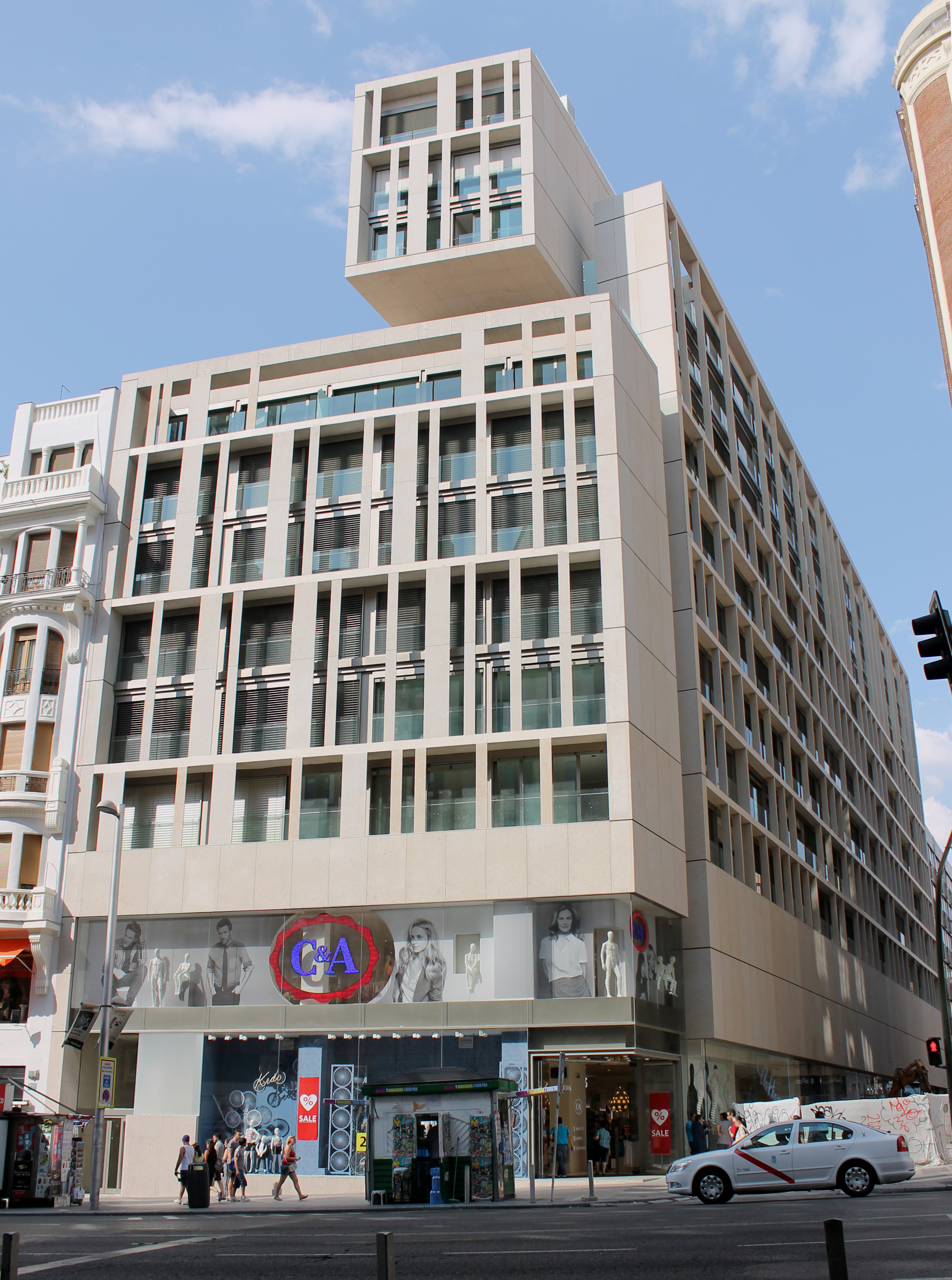
Gran Vía 48

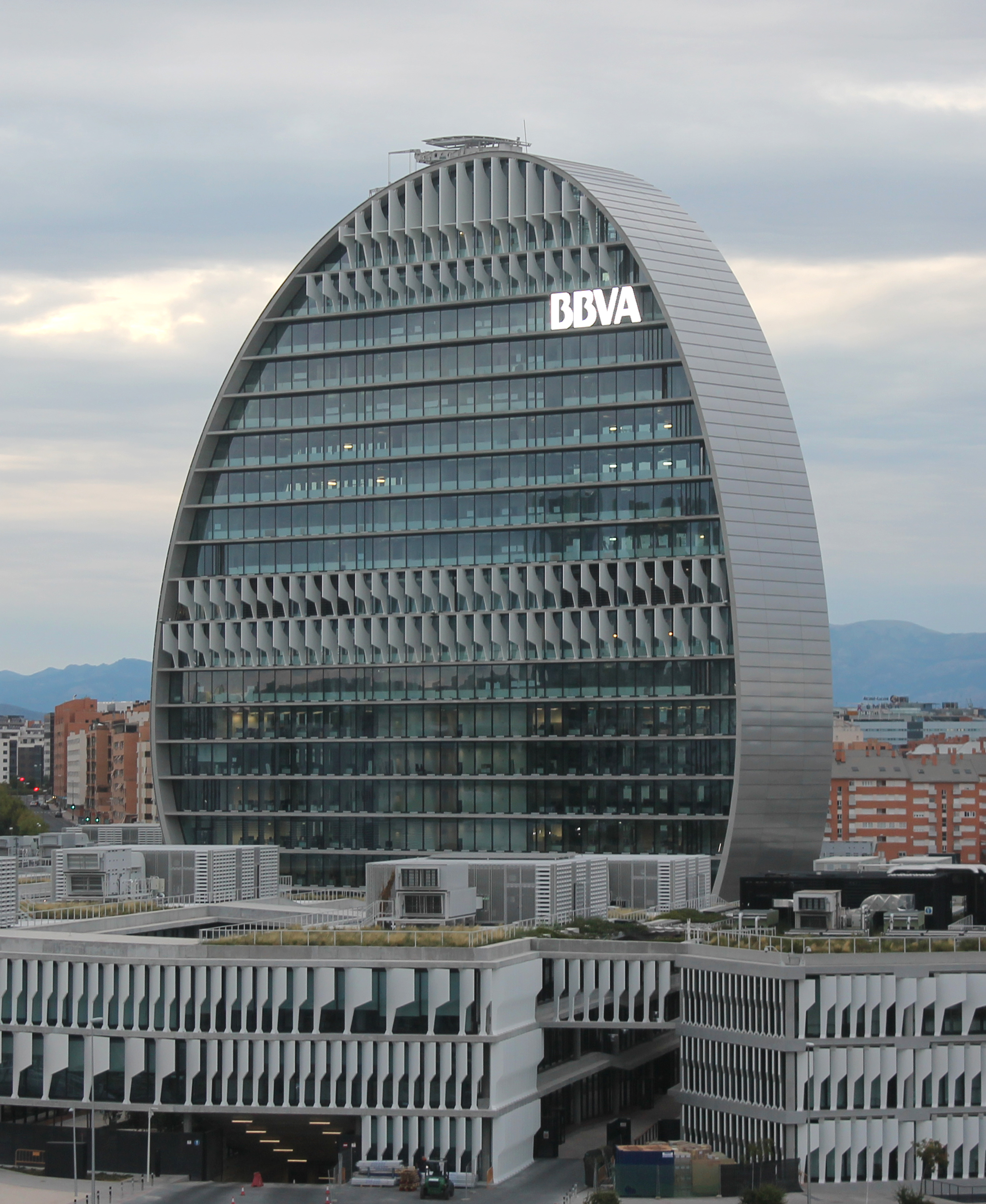
Ciudad BBVA

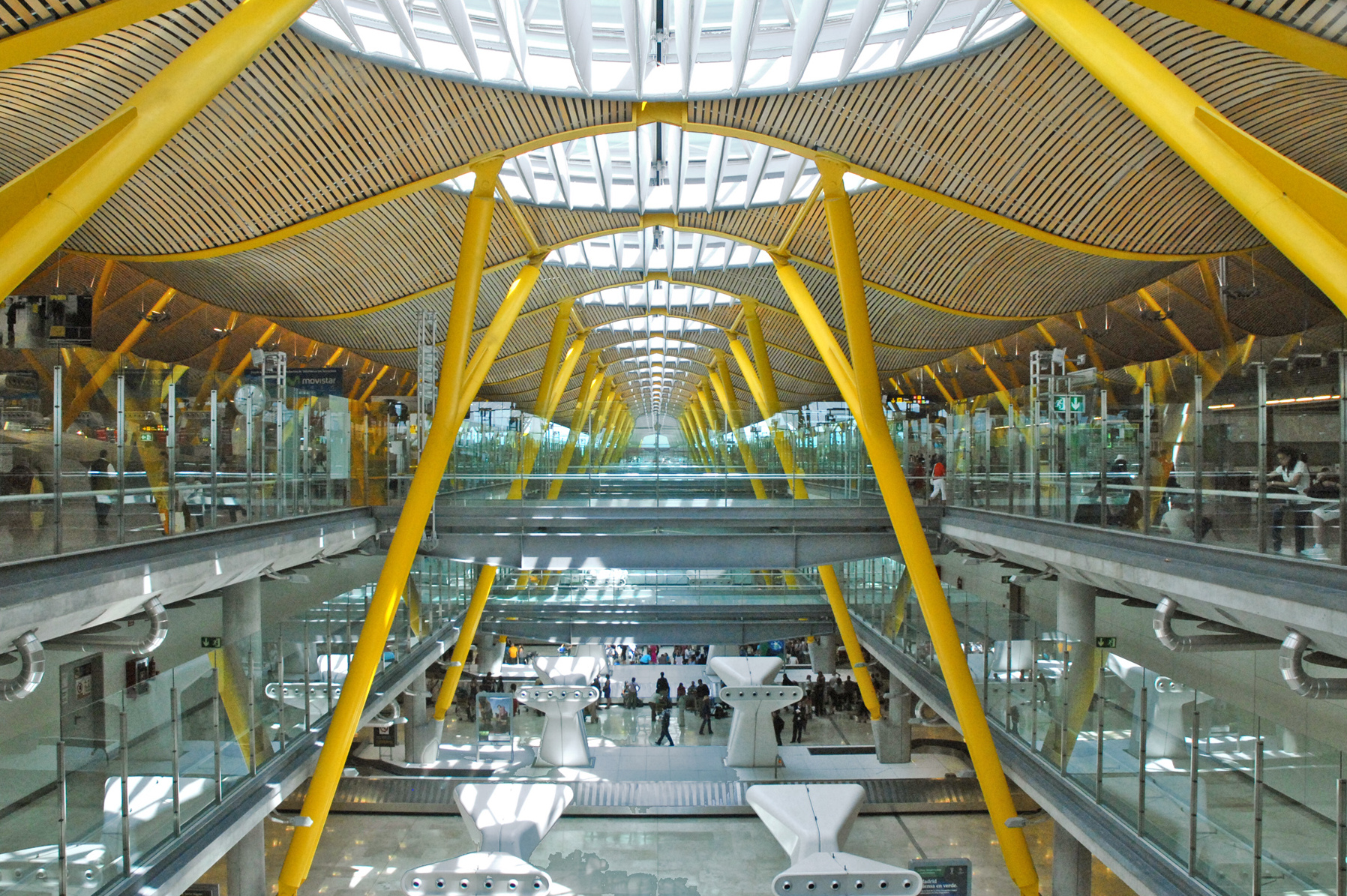
Barajas' Terminal 4

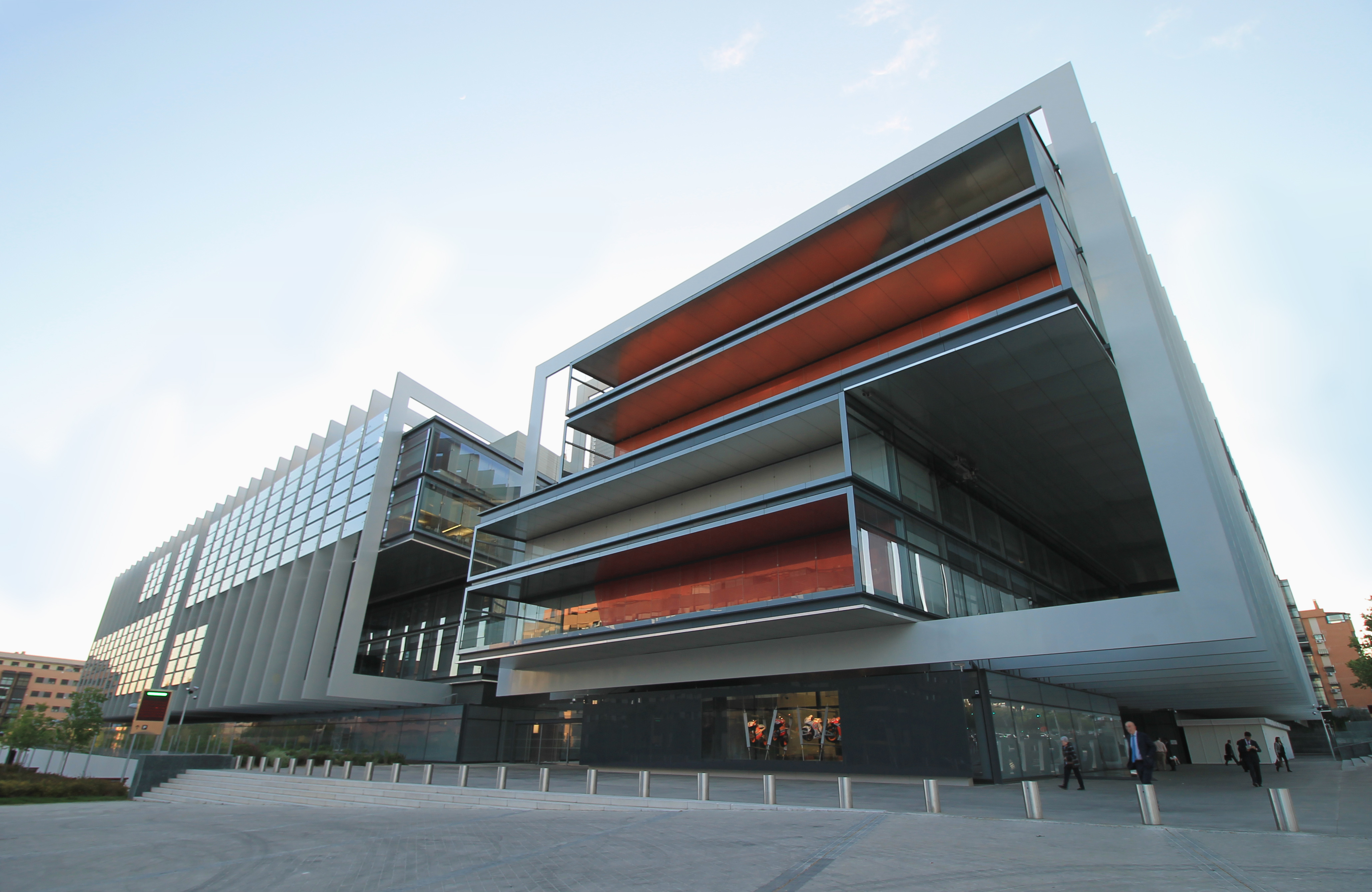
Campus Repsol

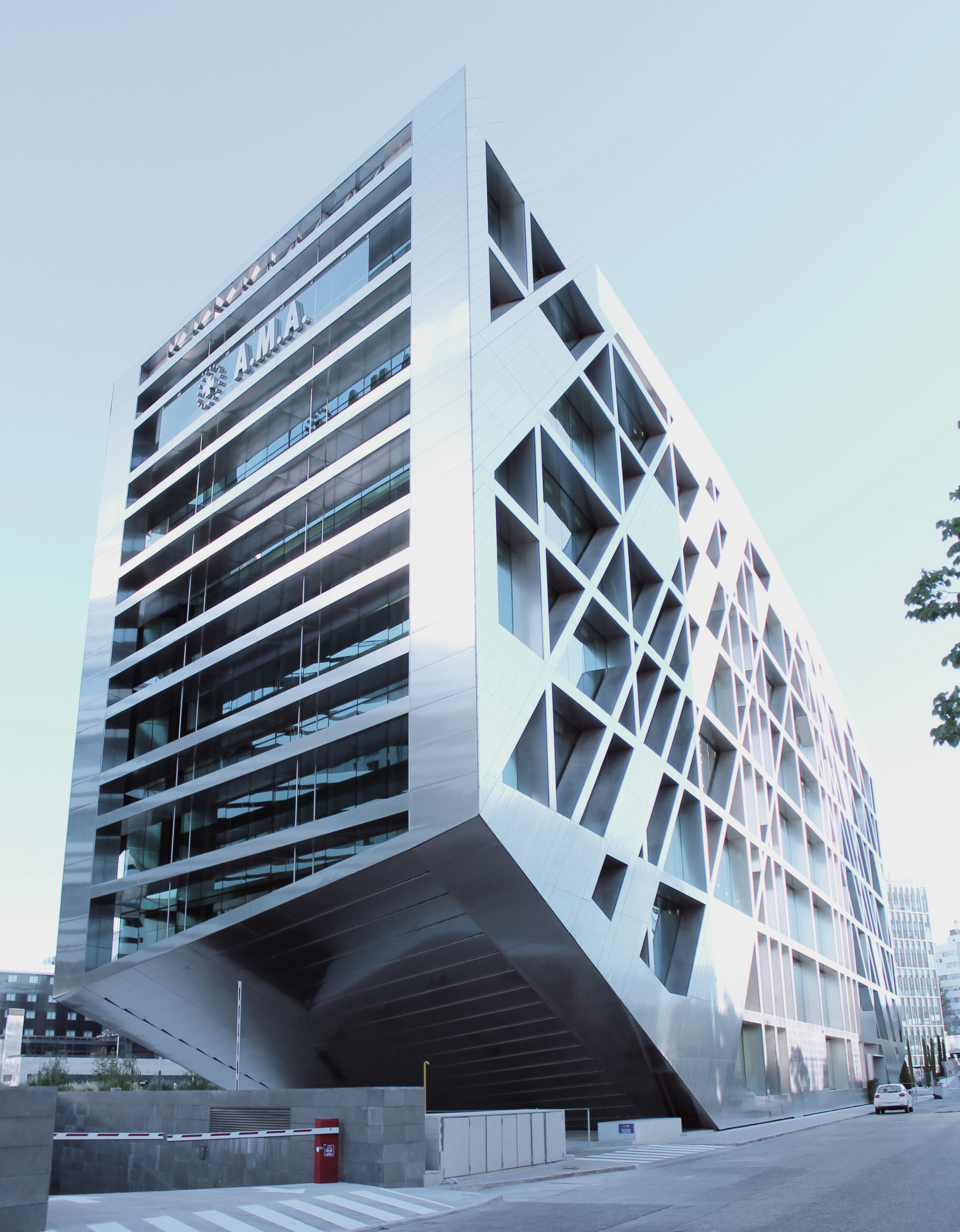
Cristalia 4A

== Sculpture ==
The streets of Madrid have many outdoor sculptures. The Museum of Outdoor Sculpture, located in the Paseo de la Castellana, is dedicated to abstract works, among which the Sirena Varada (Strander Mermaid) by Eduardo Chillida.

Since the 18th century, the Paseo del Prado is decorated with an iconographic program with classical monumental fountains: the Fuente de la Alcachofa (Fountain of the Artichoke), the Cuatro Fuentes (Four Fountains), the Fountain of Neptune, the Fountain of Apollo and the Fountain of Cybele, all designed by Ventura Rodríguez.

The equestrian sculptures are particularly important, starting chronologically with two designed in the 17th century: the statue of Philip III, in the Plaza Mayor by Giambologna, and the statue of Philip IV, in the Plaza de Oriente (projected by Velázquez and built by Pietro Tacca with scientific advice from Galileo Galilei).

Many areas of the Buen Retiro Park (Parque del Retiro) are really sculptural scenography: among them are The Fallen Angel by Ricardo Bellver, and the Monument to Alfonso XII, designed by José Grases Riera.

In another vein are the neon advertising signs, some of which have acquired a historic range and are legally protected, such as Schweppes in Plaza de Callao or Tío Pepe in the Puerta del Sol, recently retired from its location for the restoration of the building.

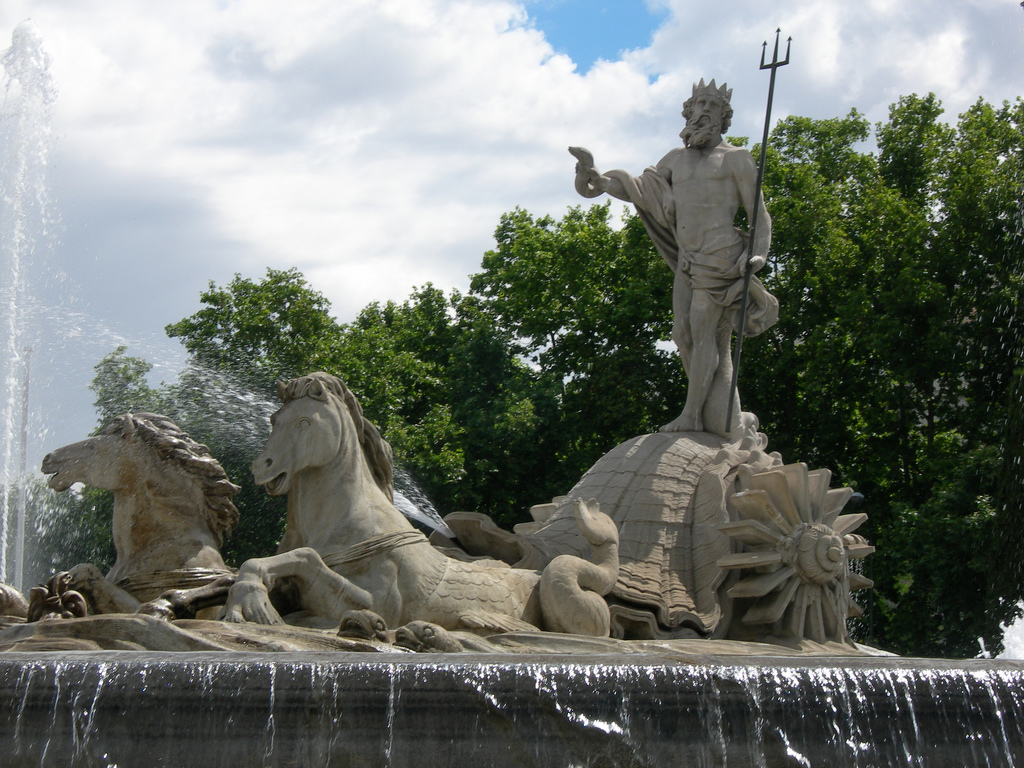
Fountain of Neptune (Ventura Rodríguez)

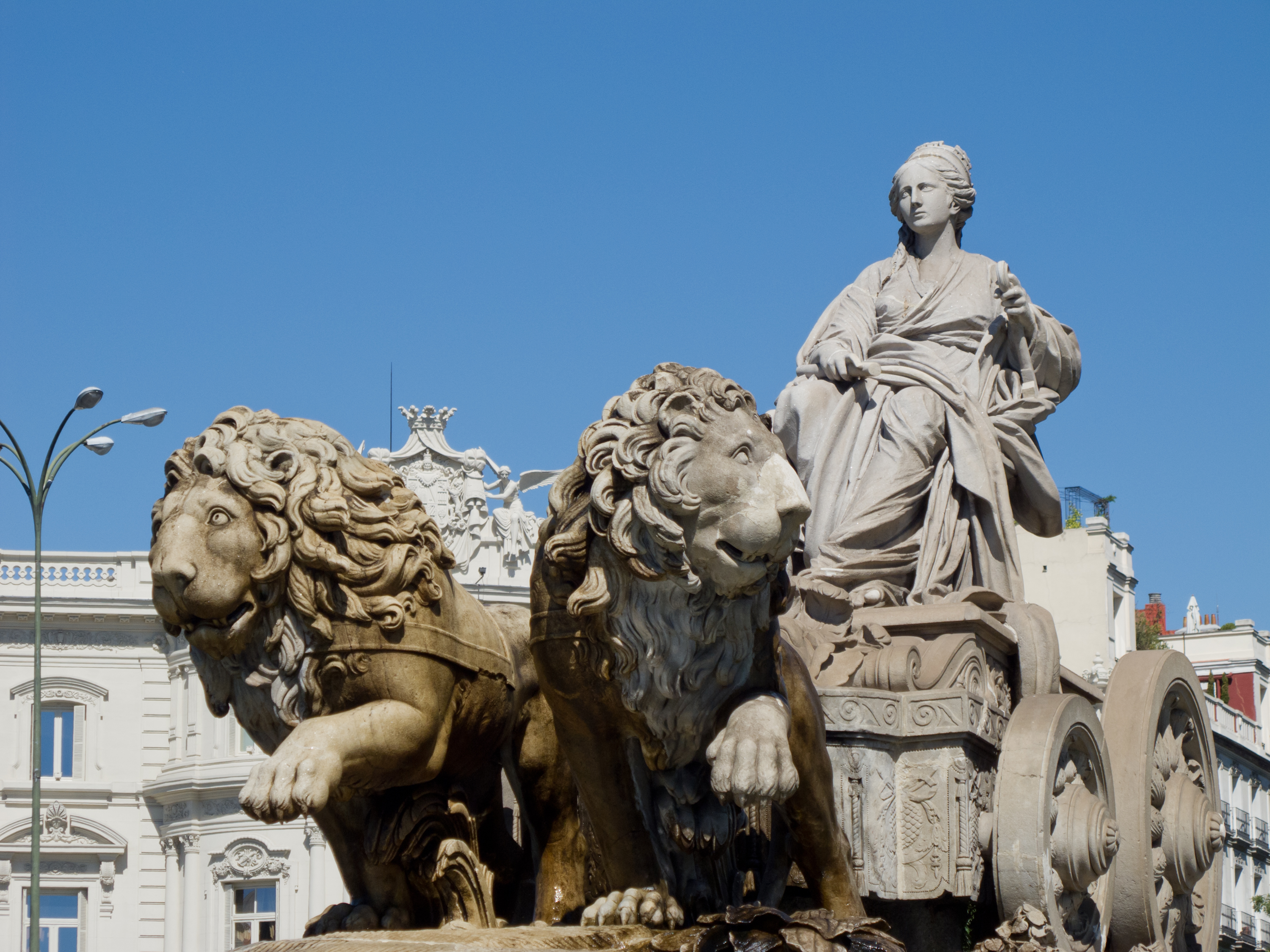
Fountain of Cybele (Ventura Rodríguez)

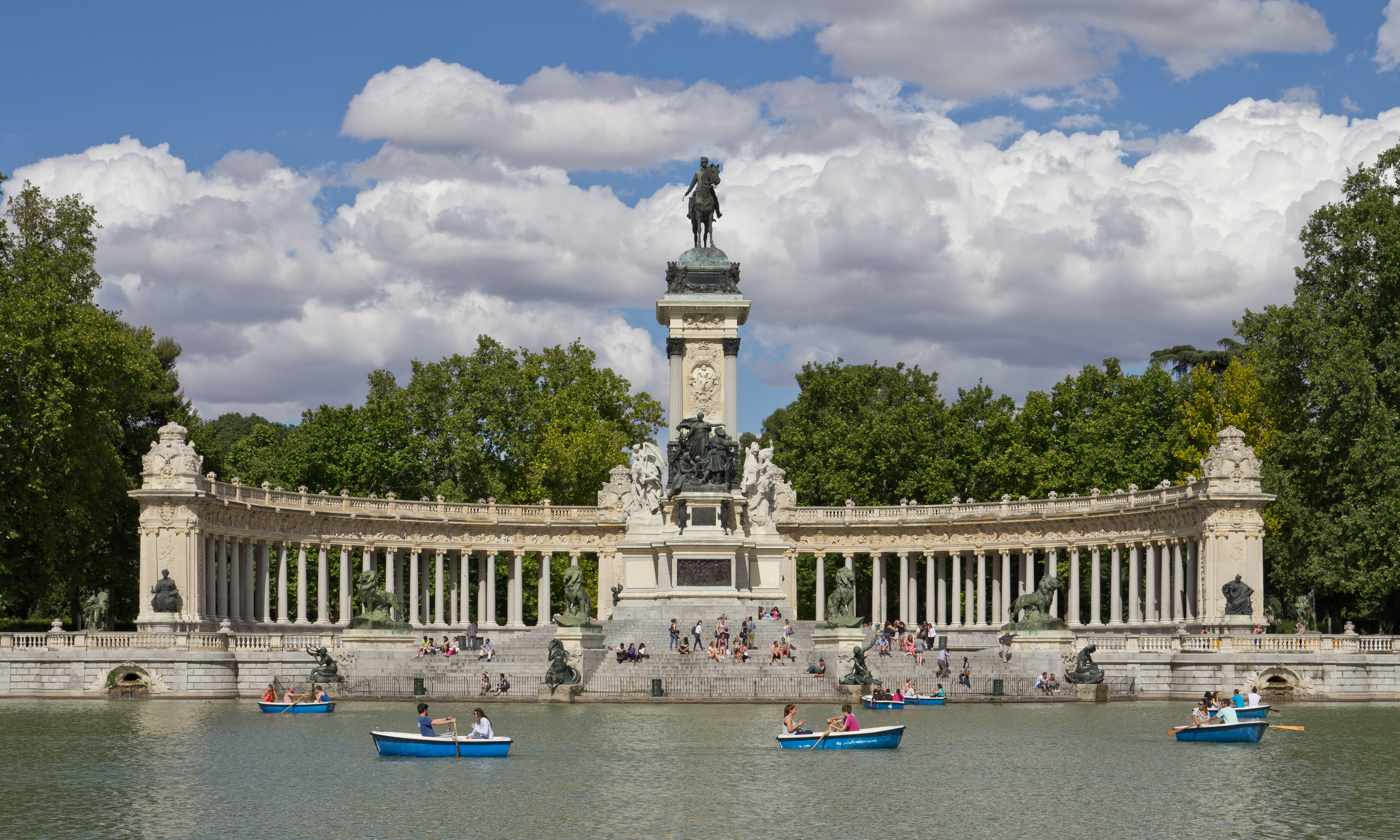
Monument to Alfonso XII (José Grases Riera)

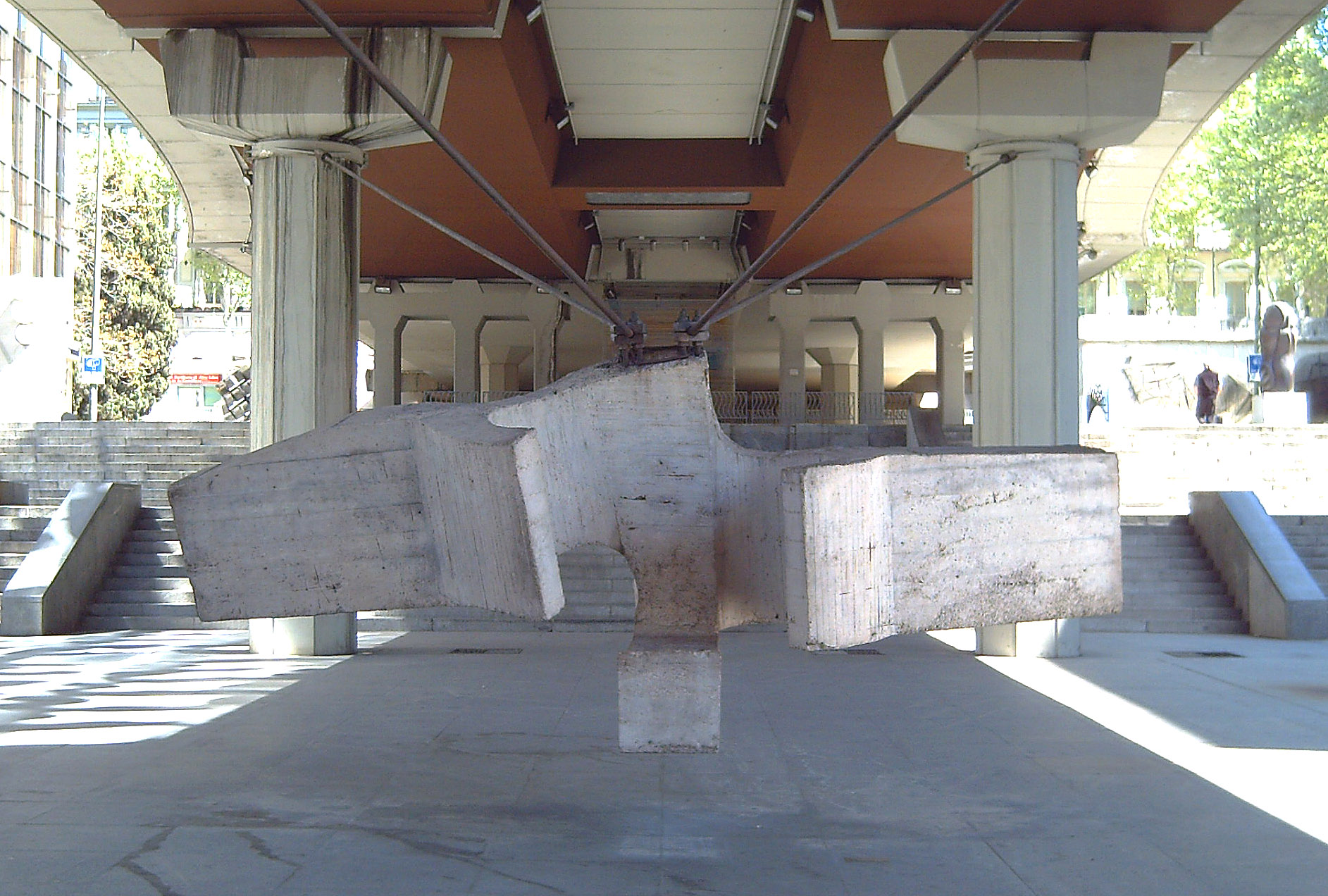
Strander Mermaid (Eduardo Chillida)
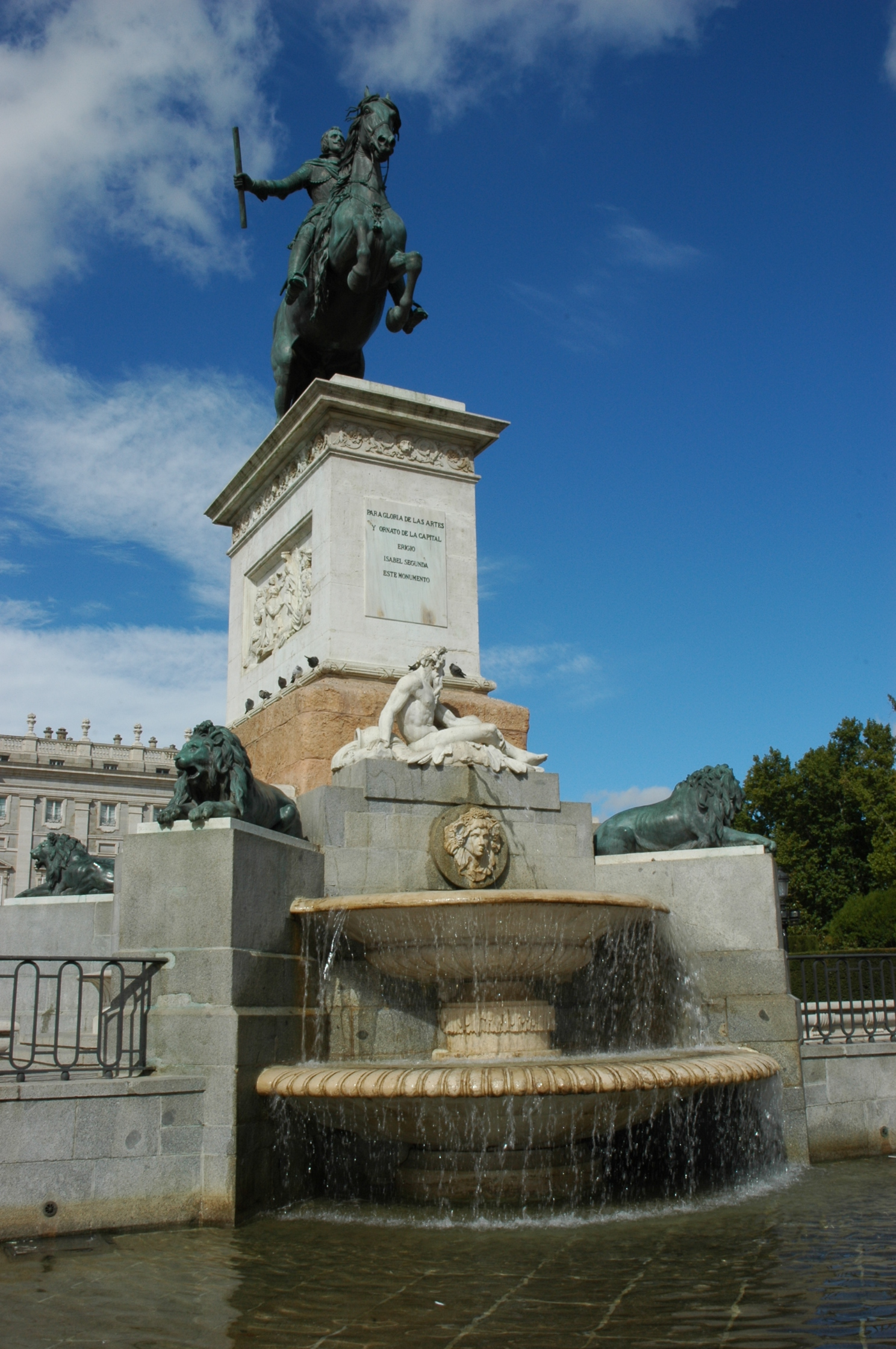
Philip IV (Pietro Tacca)

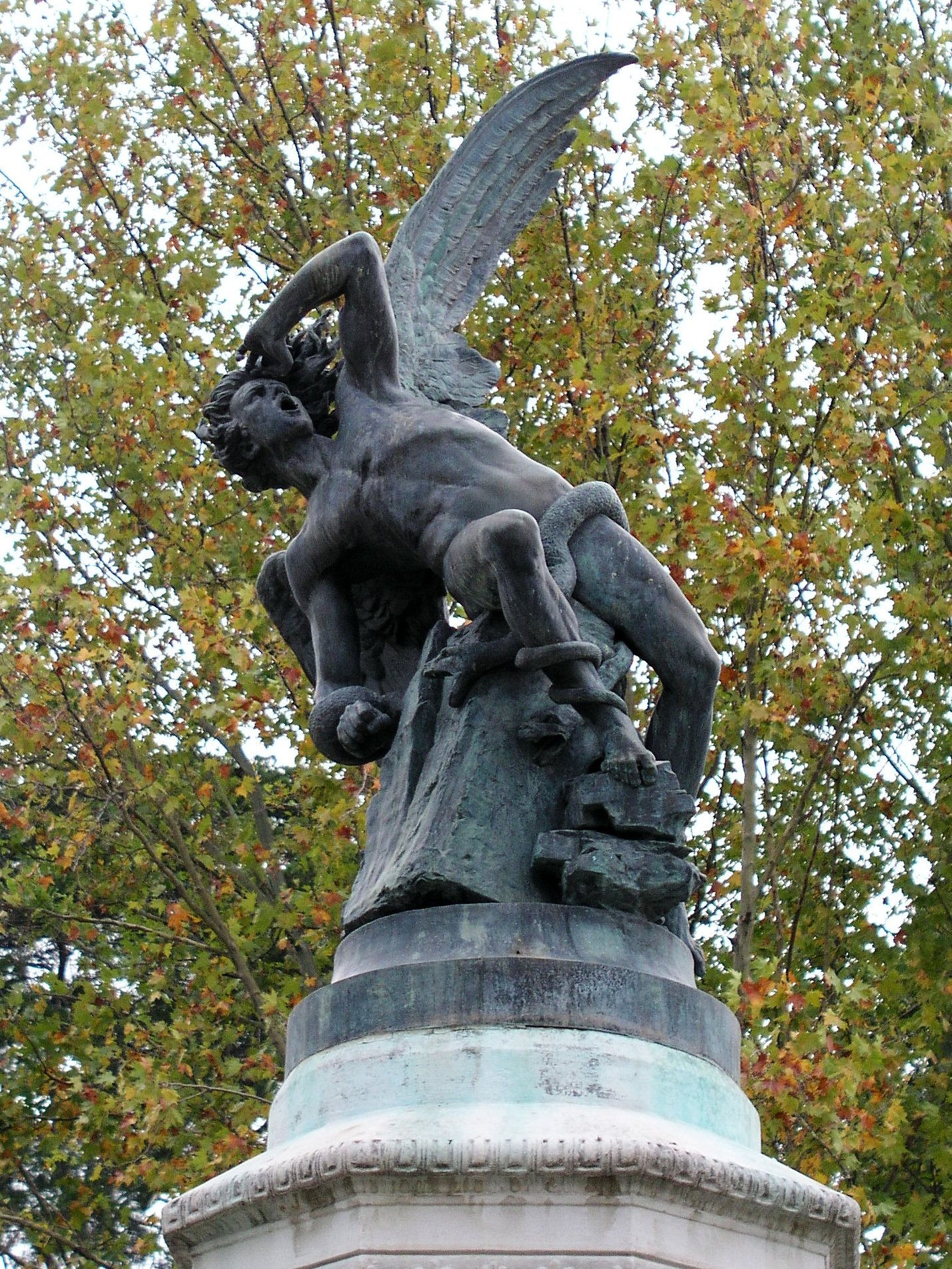
Fuente del Ángel Caído (Ricardo Bellver)

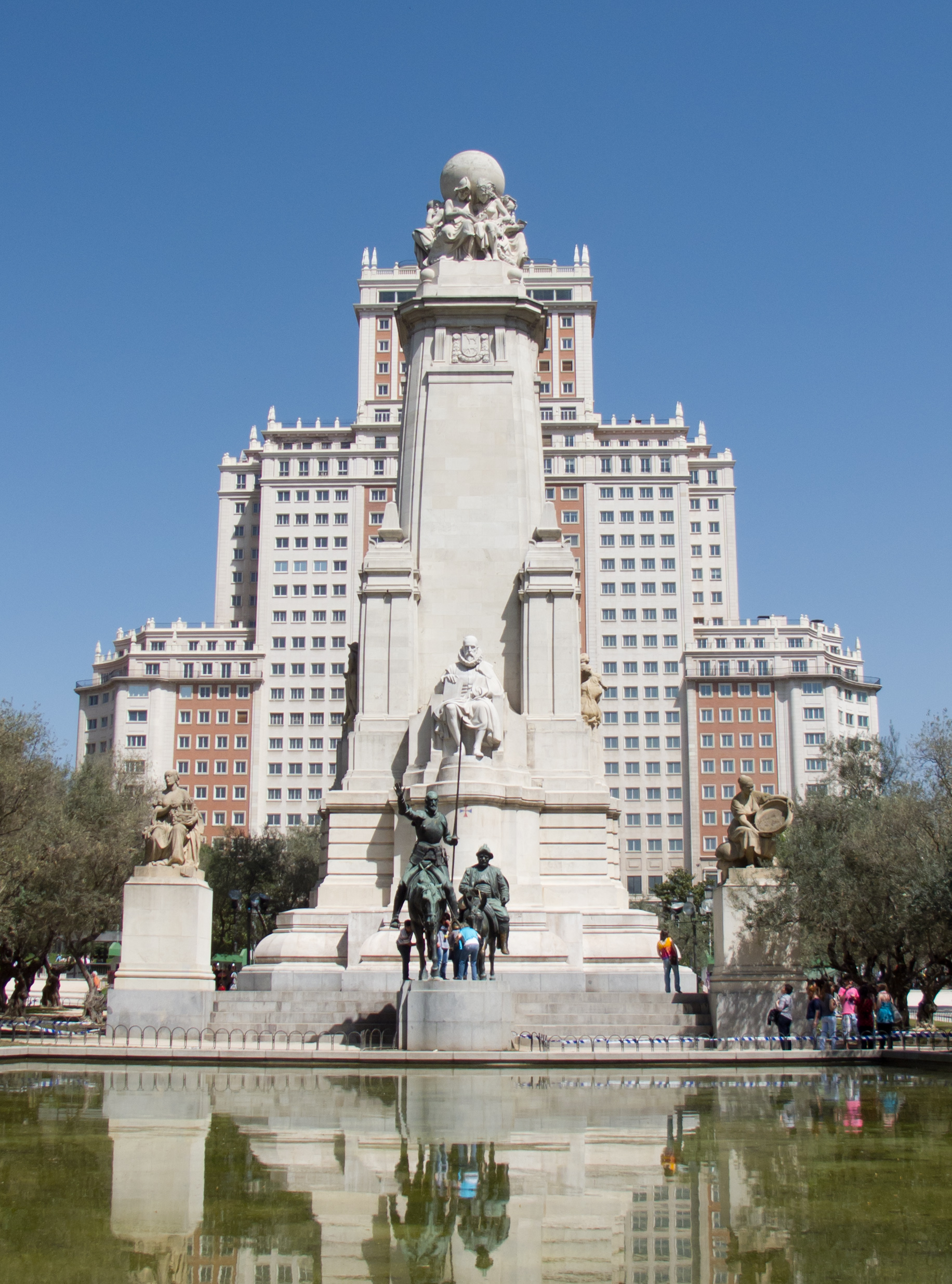
Cervantes Monument at Plaza de España (Madrid)

== Religious architecture ==
=== Catholic churches ===
Madrid has a considerable number of Catholic churches, some of which are among the most important Spanish religious artworks.

The oldest church that survives today is San Nicolás de los Servitas, whose oldest item is the bell tower (12th century), in Mudéjar style. The next oldest church is San Pedro el Real, with its high brick tower.

St. Jerome Church is a gothic church next to El Prado Museum. The Catholic Monarchs ordered its construction in the beginning of the 16th century, as part of a vanished monastery. The monastery's cloister is preserved. It has recently been renovated by Rafael Moneo, with the goal to house the neoclassical collection of El Prado Museum, and also sculptures by Leone Leoni and Pompeo Leoni.

The Bishop Chapel is a gothic chapel built in the 16th century by order of the Bishop of Plasencia, Gutierre de Vargas. It was originally built to house the remains of Saint Isidore Laborer (Madrid's patron saint), but it was used as the Vargas family mausoleum. Inside are the altarpiece and the tombs of the Vargas family, which were the work of Francisco Giralte, a disciple of Alonso Berruguete. They are considered masterpieces of Spanish Renaissance sculpture.

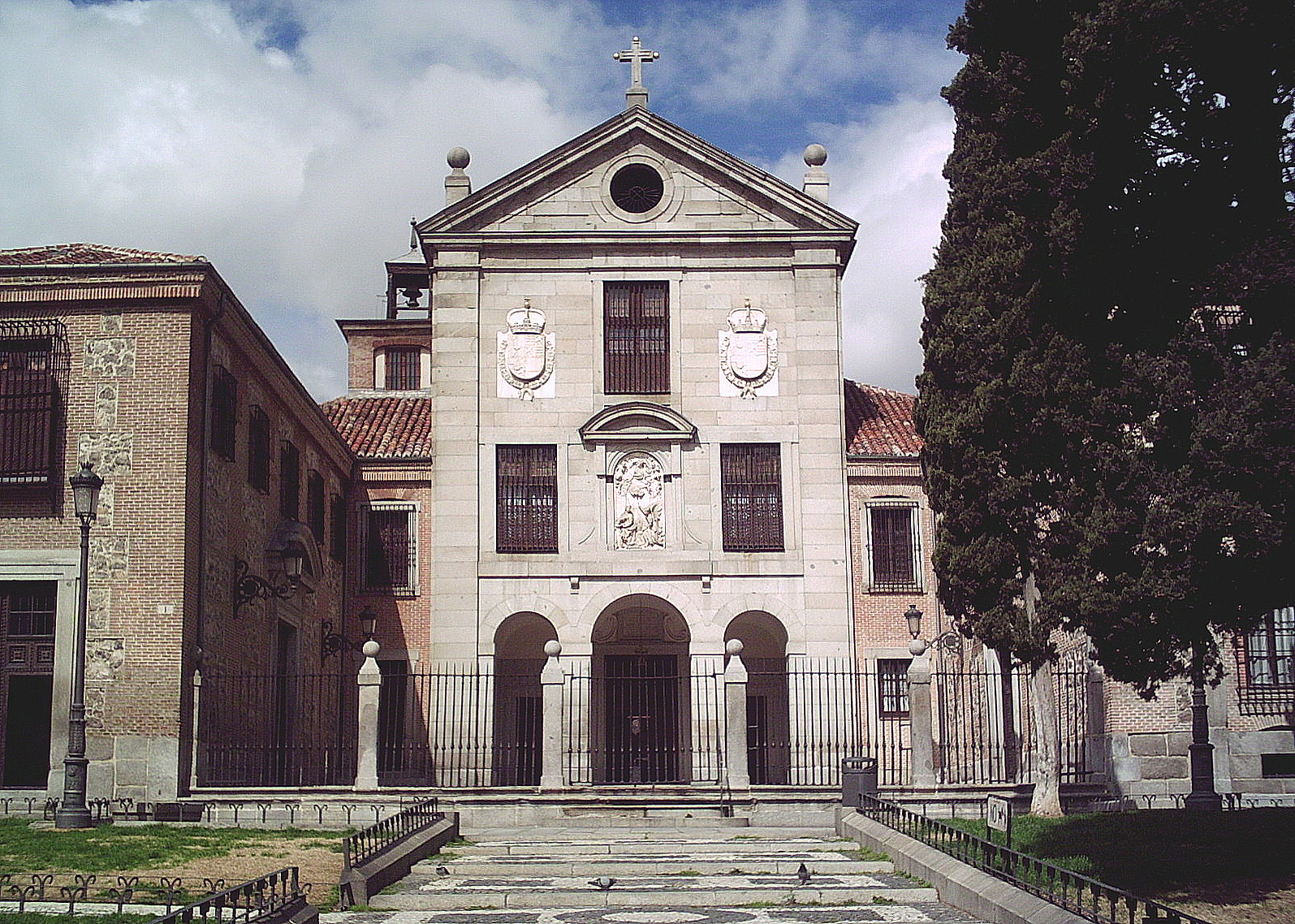
Royal Convent of La Encarnación (façade)

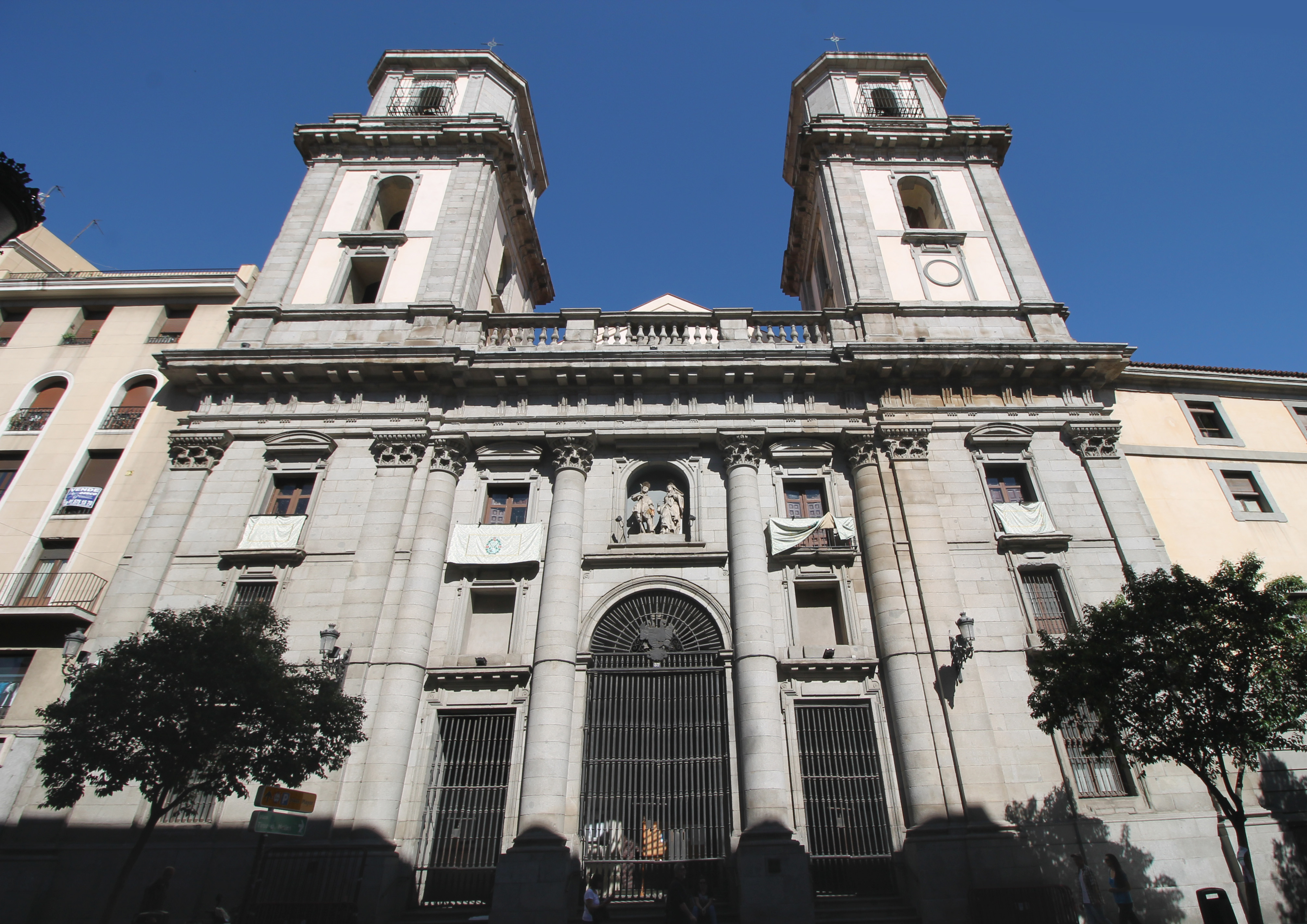
Colegiata de San Isidro

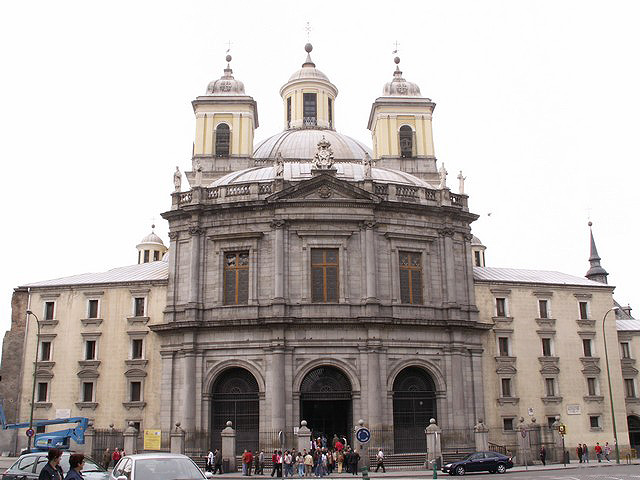
Basílica de San Francisco el Grande

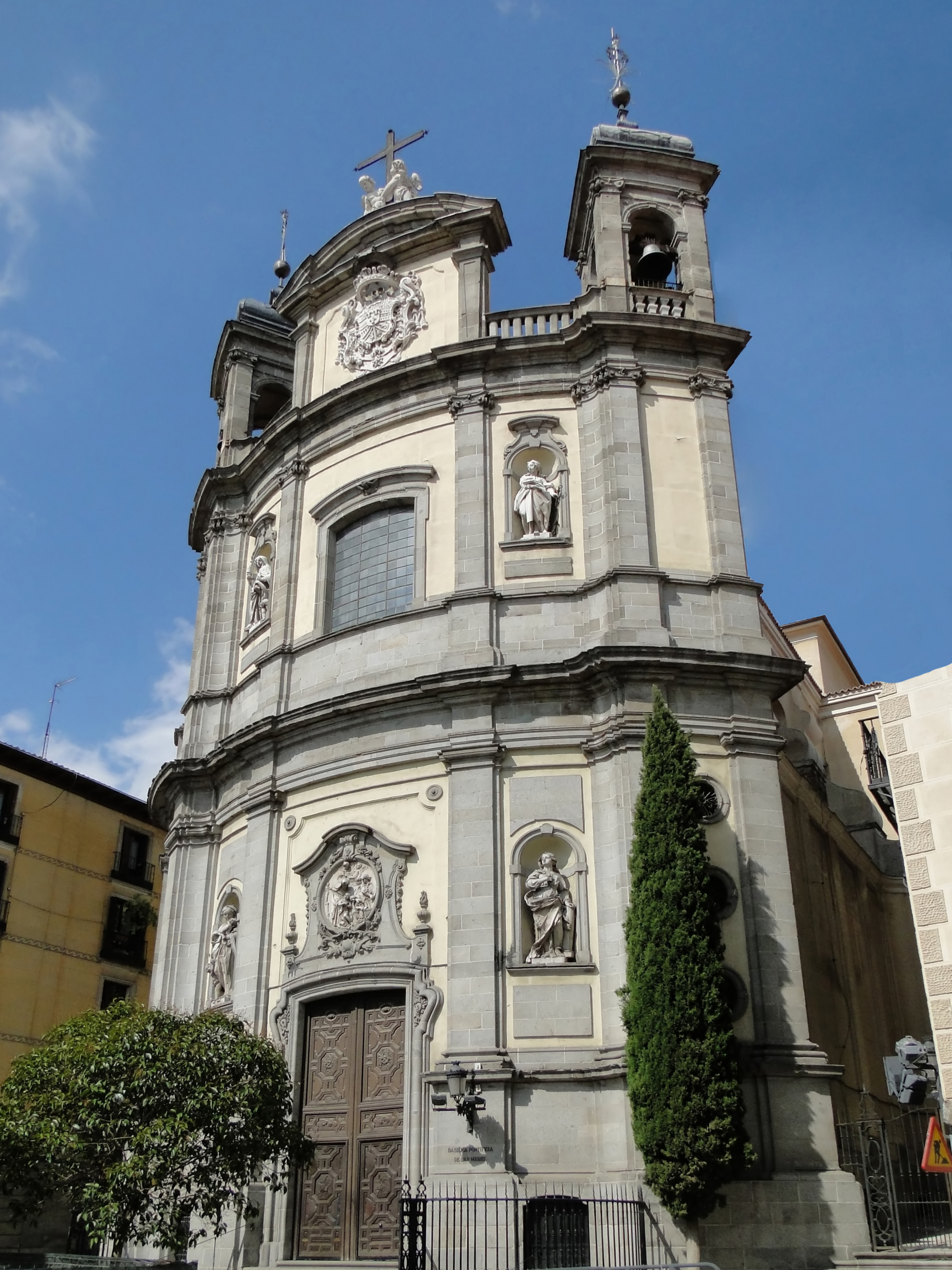
Basílica pontificia de San Miguel

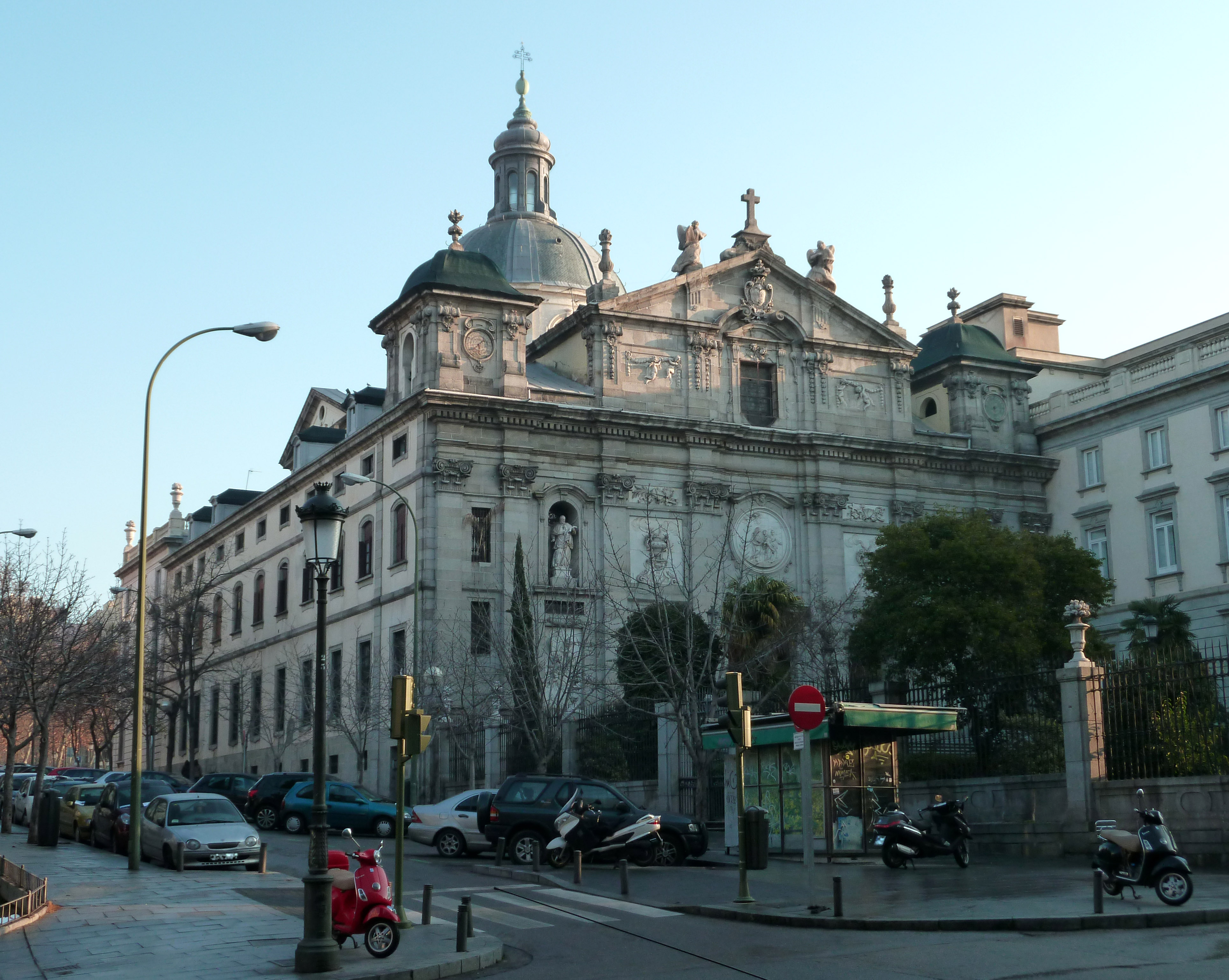
St. Barbara's Church.

St. Isidore Church was built between 1620 and 1664 by order of Empress Maria of Austria, daughter of Charles V of Germany and I of Spain, to become part of a school run by the Jesuits, which still exists today. Its dome is the first example of a dome drawing on a wooden frame covered with plaster, which, given its lightness, makes it easy to support the walls. It was the cathedral of Madrid between 1885 and 1993, which is the time it took to build the Almudena. The artworks inside were mostly burned during the Spanish Civil War, but it retained the tomb that holds the incorrupt body of Saint Isidore Laborer and the urn containing the ashes of his wife, Maria Torribia.

The Royal Convent of La Encarnación is an Augustinian Recollect convent. The institution, which belonged to ladies of the nobility, was founded by Queen Margaret of Austria, wife of Philip III of Spain, in the early 17th century. Due to the frescoes and sculptures it houses, it is one of the most prominent temples in the city. The building's architect was Fray Alberto de la Madre de Dios, who built it between 1611 and 1616. The façade responds to an inspiring Herrerian style, with great austerity, and it was imitated by other Spanish churches. The church's interior is a sumptuous work by the great Baroque architect Ventura Rodriguez.

In the church are preserved shrines containing the blood of St. Januarius and St. Pantaleon, the second (according to tradition) liquefies every year on the saint's day on 27 July.

San Antonio de los Alemanes (St. Anthony Church) is a pretty 17th-century church that was originally part of a Portuguese hospital. Subsequently, it was donated to the Germans living in the city.

The interior of the church has been restored, and includes several frescoes painted by Luca Giordano, Francisco Carreño, and Francisco Rizi. The frescoes represent some kings of Spain, Hungary, France, Germany, and Bohemia. They all sit looking at the paintings in the vault, which represent the life of Saint Anthony of Padua.

The Royal Chapel of St. Anthony of La Florida is sometimes named the "Goya's Sistine Chapel". The chapel was built on orders of King Charles IV of Spain, who also commissioned the frescoes by Goya. These were completed over a six-month period in 1798. The frescoes portray miracles by Saint Anthony of Padua, including one that occurred in Lisbon but that the painter has relocated to Madrid. Every year on 13 June, the chapel becomes the site of a lively pilgrimage in which young unwed women come to pray to St. Anthony and ask for a partner.

San Francisco el Grande Basilica was built in neoclassical style in the second half of the 18th century by Francesco Sabatini. It has the fifth largest diameter dome to Christianity. (33 metres (108 feet) in diameter: it's smaller than the dome of Rome's Pantheon (43.4 metres or 142.4 feet), St. Peter's Basilica (42.4 metres or 139.1 feet), the Florence Cathedral (42 metres or 138 feet), and the Rotunda of Mosta (37.2 metres or 122.0 feet) in Malta, but it's larger than St. Paul's Cathedral (30.8 metres or 101 feet) in London and Hagia Sophia (31.8 metres or 104 feet) in Istanbul).

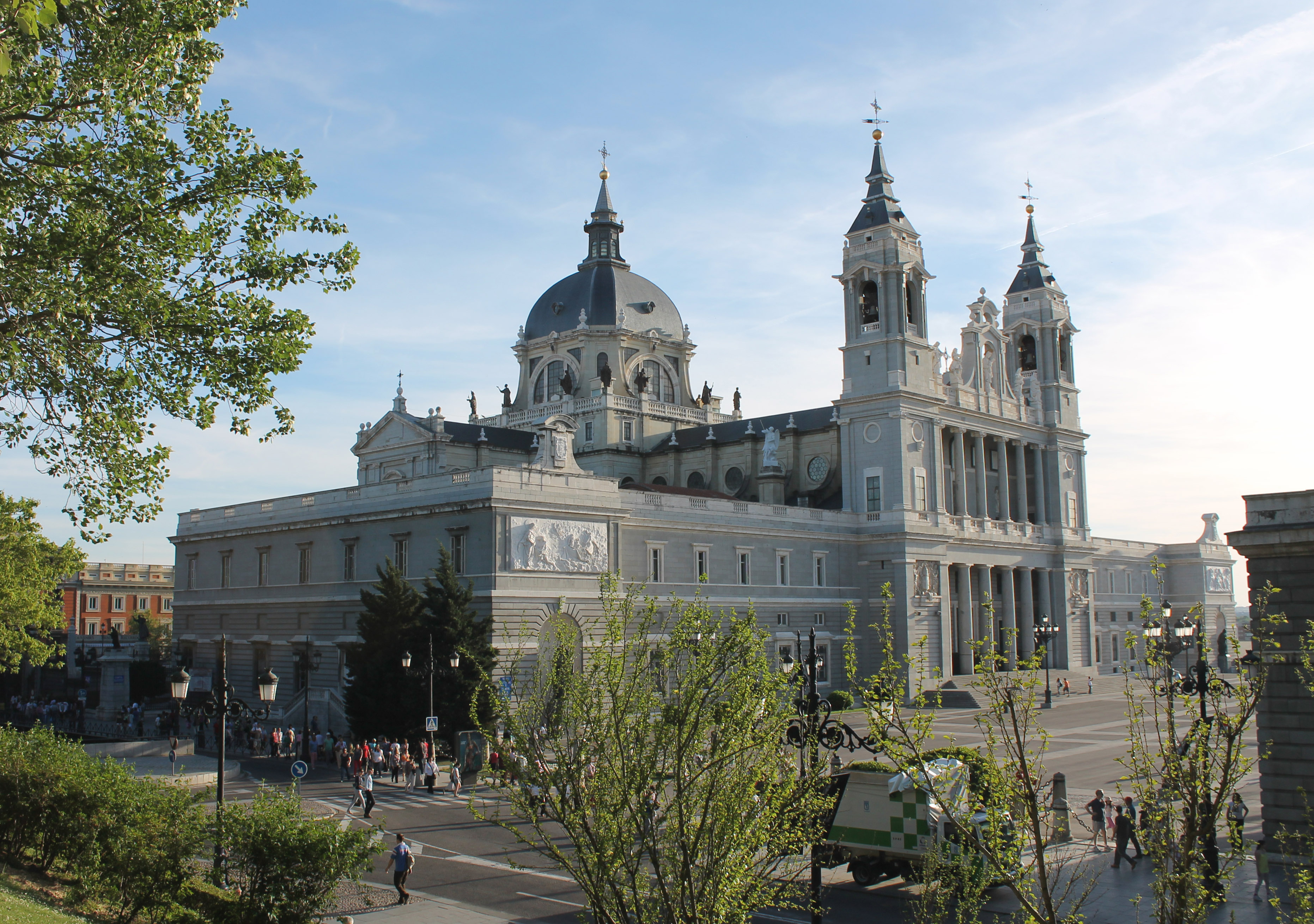
Almudena Cathedral is the current cathedral.

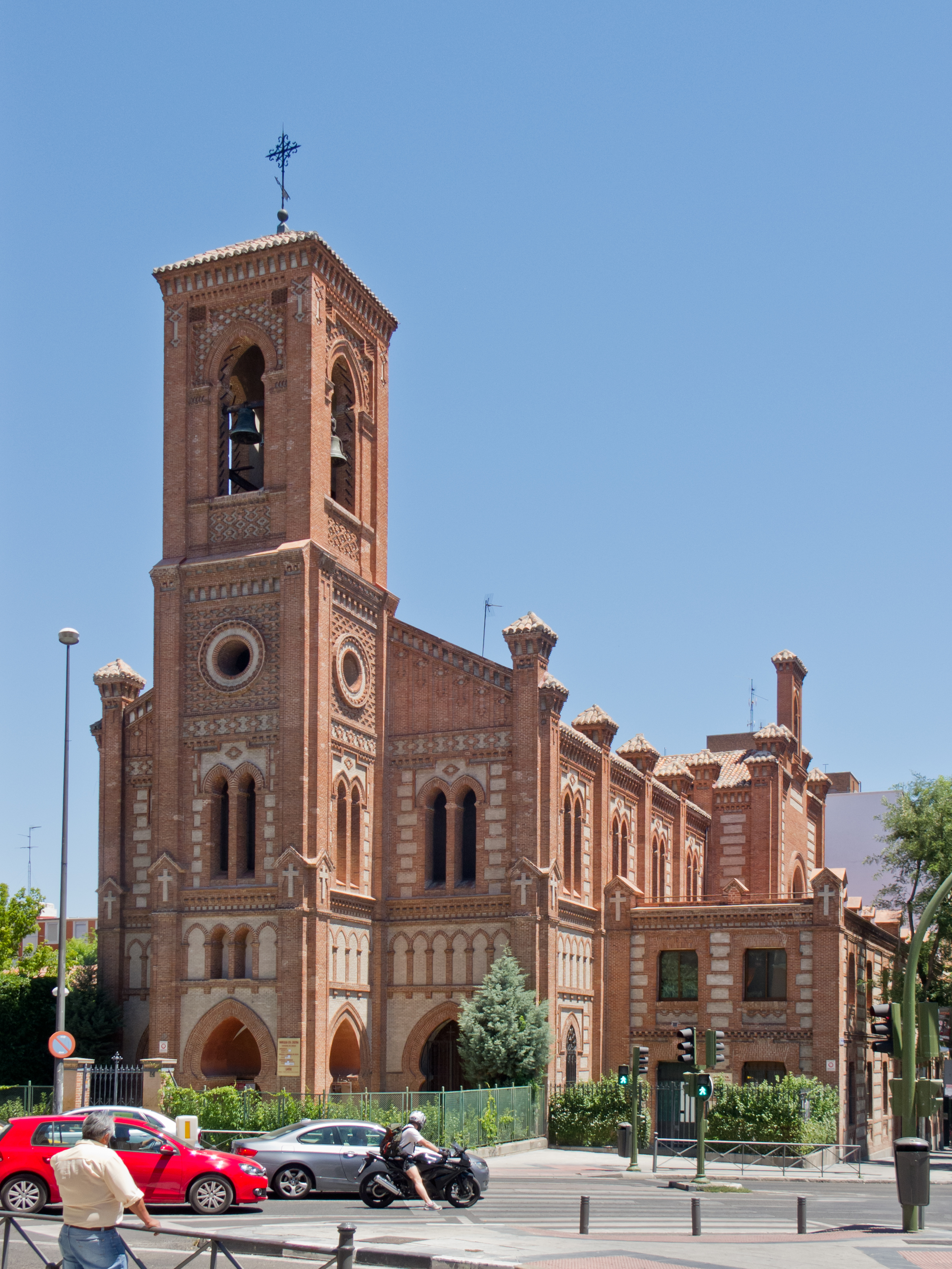
Church of Santa Cristina (Neo-Mudéjar)

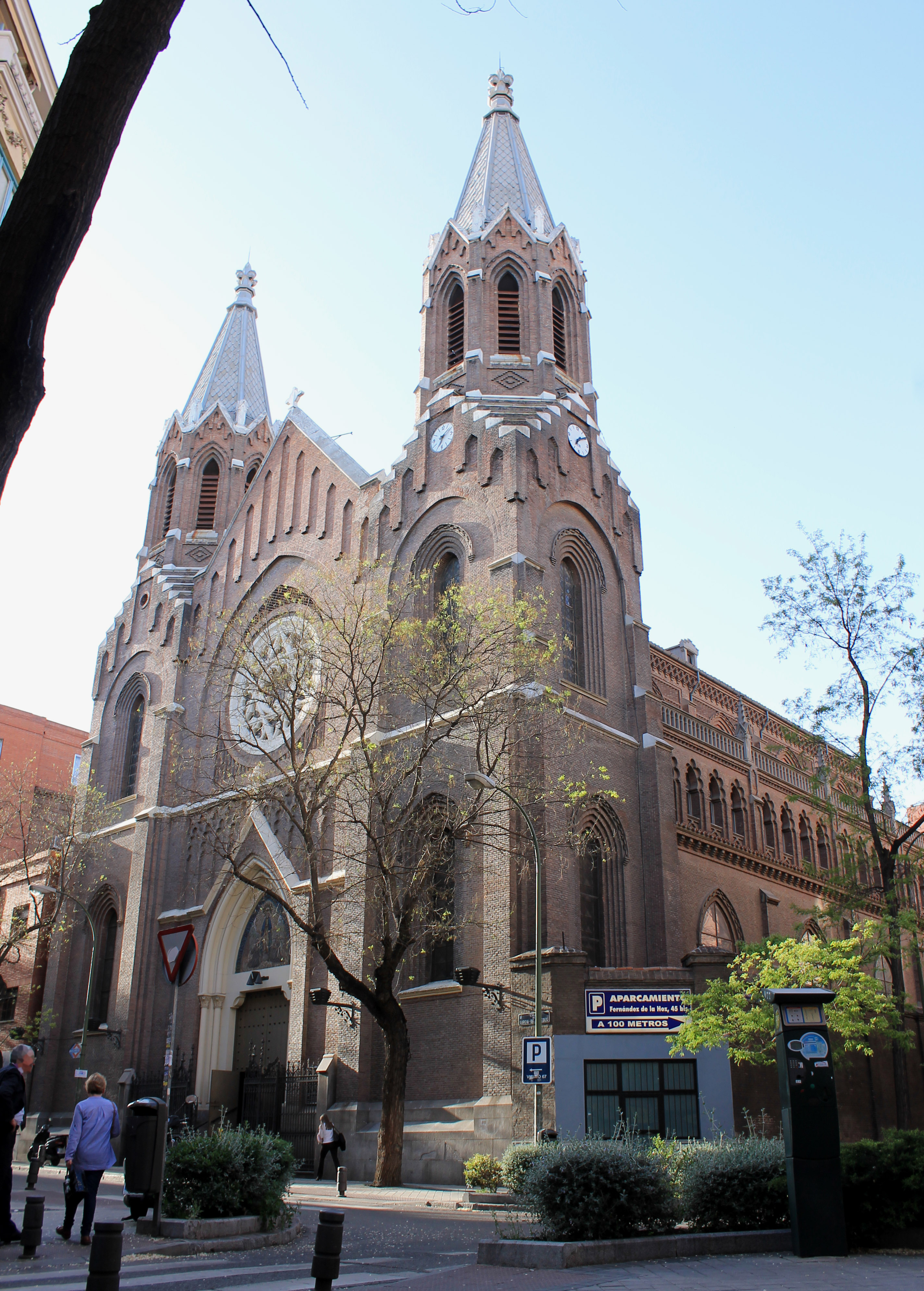
Basílica de la Milagrosa (Gothic Revival)

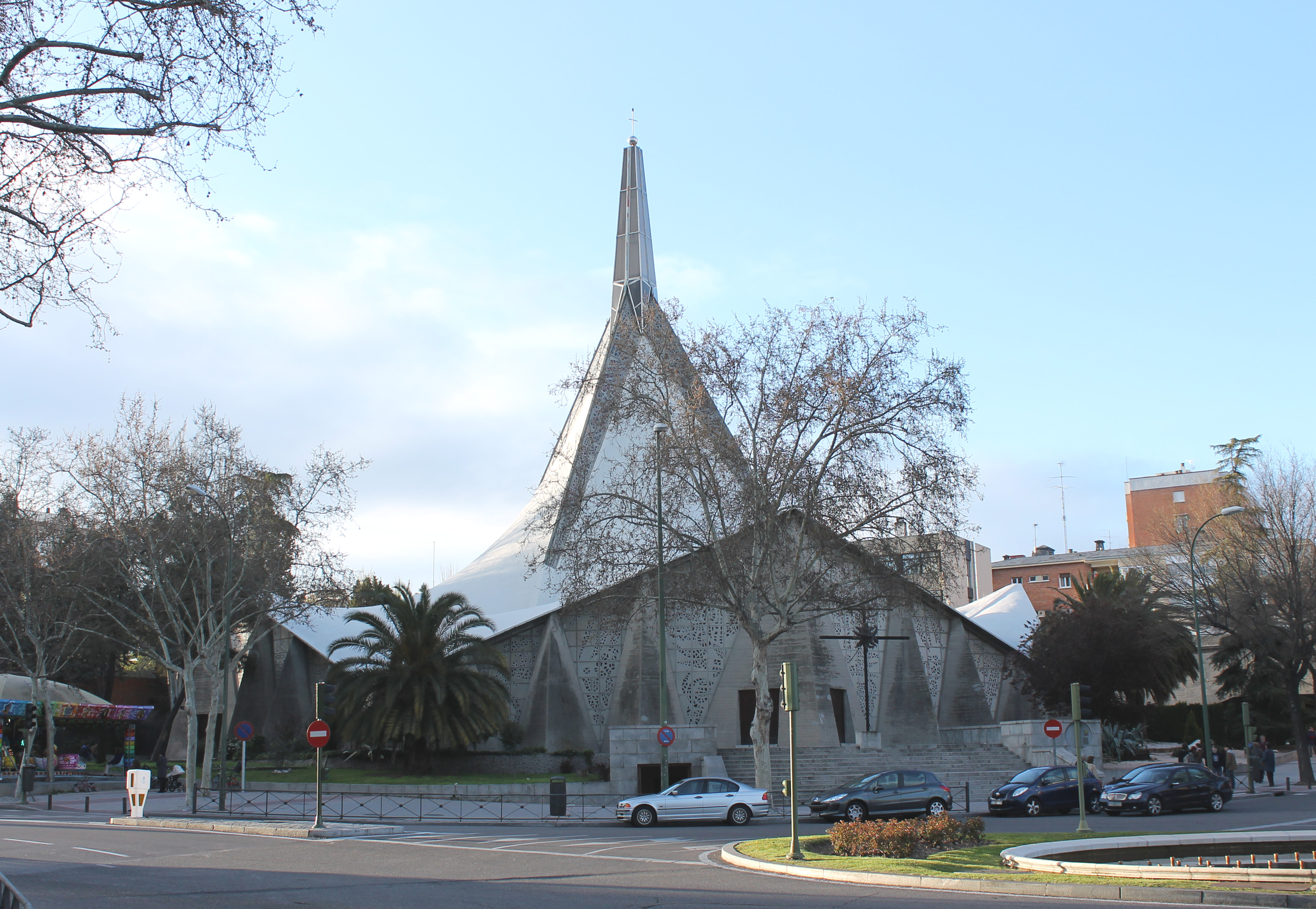
Church of Nuestra Señora de Guadalupe (a postconciliar church)

The church is dedicated to St. Francis of Assisi, who according to legend was established in Madrid during his pilgrimage to Santiago de Compostela. Its sumptuous interior features many artworks, including paintings by Goya and Zurbarán.

The Cathedral of Santa María la Real de la Almudena is the episcopal seat of the Archdiocese of Madrid. It is a temple 102 metres (335 feet) long and 73 metres (240 feet) high, built during the 19th and 20th centuries in a mixture of different styles: neoclassical exterior, neo-Gothic interior, neo-Romanesque crypt, and neo-Byzantine apse's paints. The cathedral was built in the same place as the Moorish citadel (Al-Mudayna). It was consecrated by Pope John Paul II on his fourth trip to Spain on 15 June 1993, thus becoming the only Spanish cathedral dedicated by a pope.

The Church of La Concepción is a neogothic Catholic church, opened in 1914.

== Bridges, viaducts, water supply and tunnels ==
There is no evidence of the existence of bridges over the Manzanares during the time of al-Andalus (fords and pontoons were used instead). There was a small "alcantarilla" (small bridge) crossing a creek that ran along what it is now the Calle de Segovia. Some bridges (thought to be not particularly sound, as the chronicles mentioned the frequent repairs after river floods) were built as the city developed after the Christian conquest in the 11th century. The first mentions to bridges were the puente Toledana and the puente Segoviana across the Manzanares and the puente de Viveros across the Jarama (located far from the city in the latter case), but until Madrid did not become capital of the Habsburg Dynasty in the 16th century, no steady bridges able to resist the seasonal rise of the Manzanares were built.

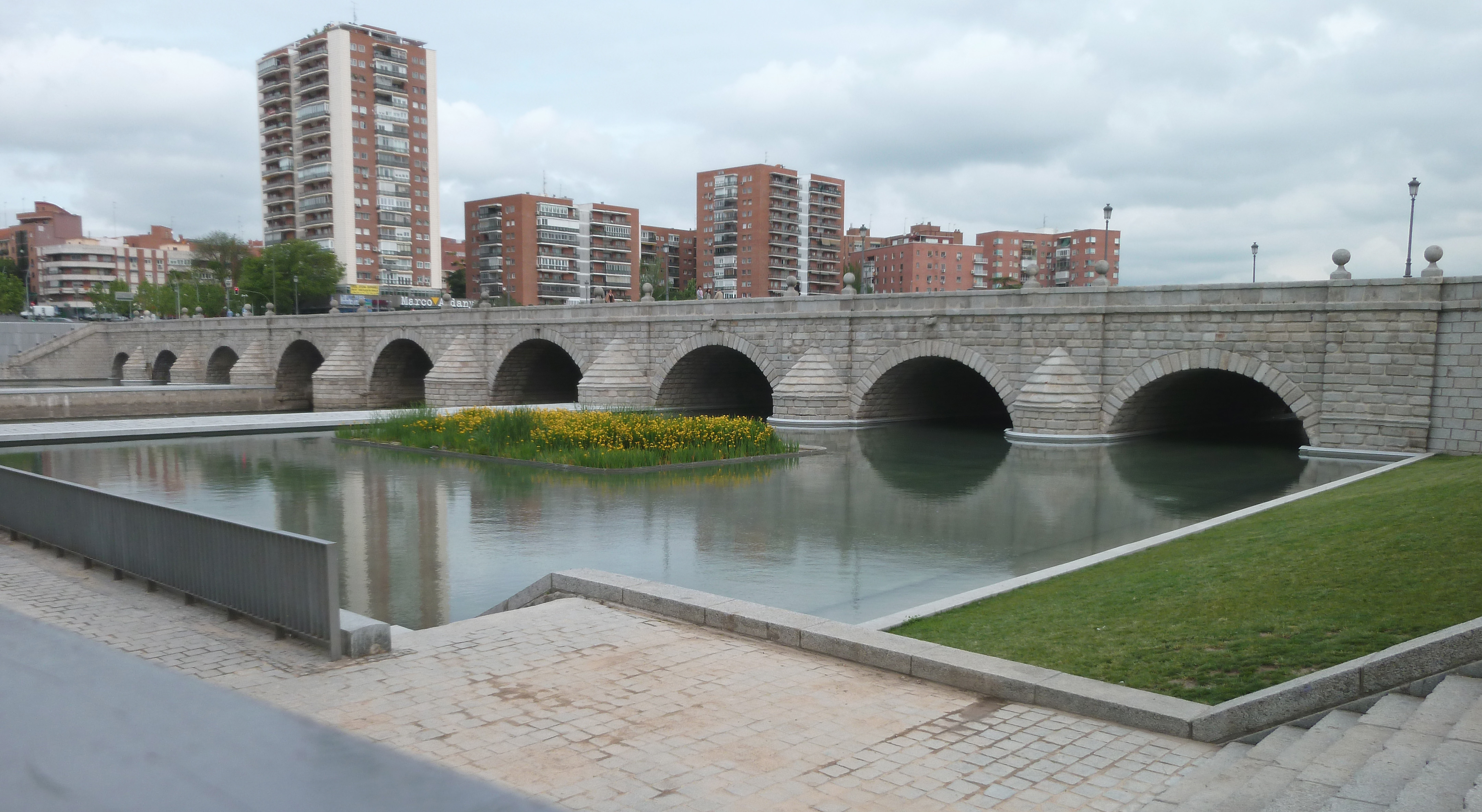
Puente de Segovia

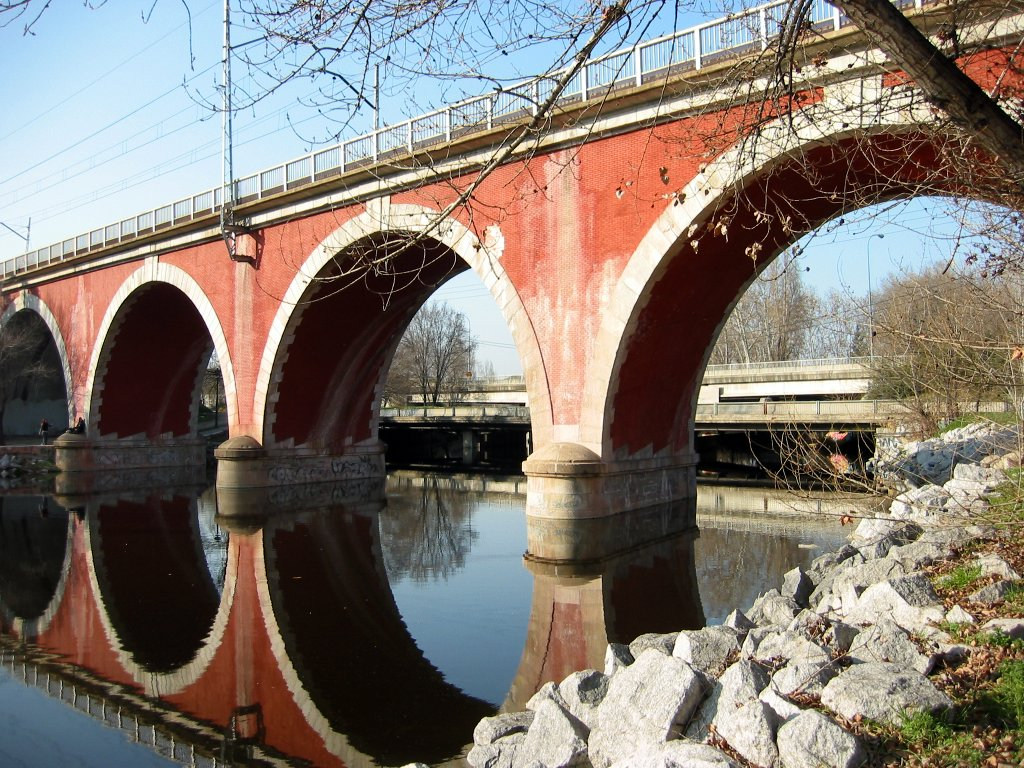
Puente de los Franceses

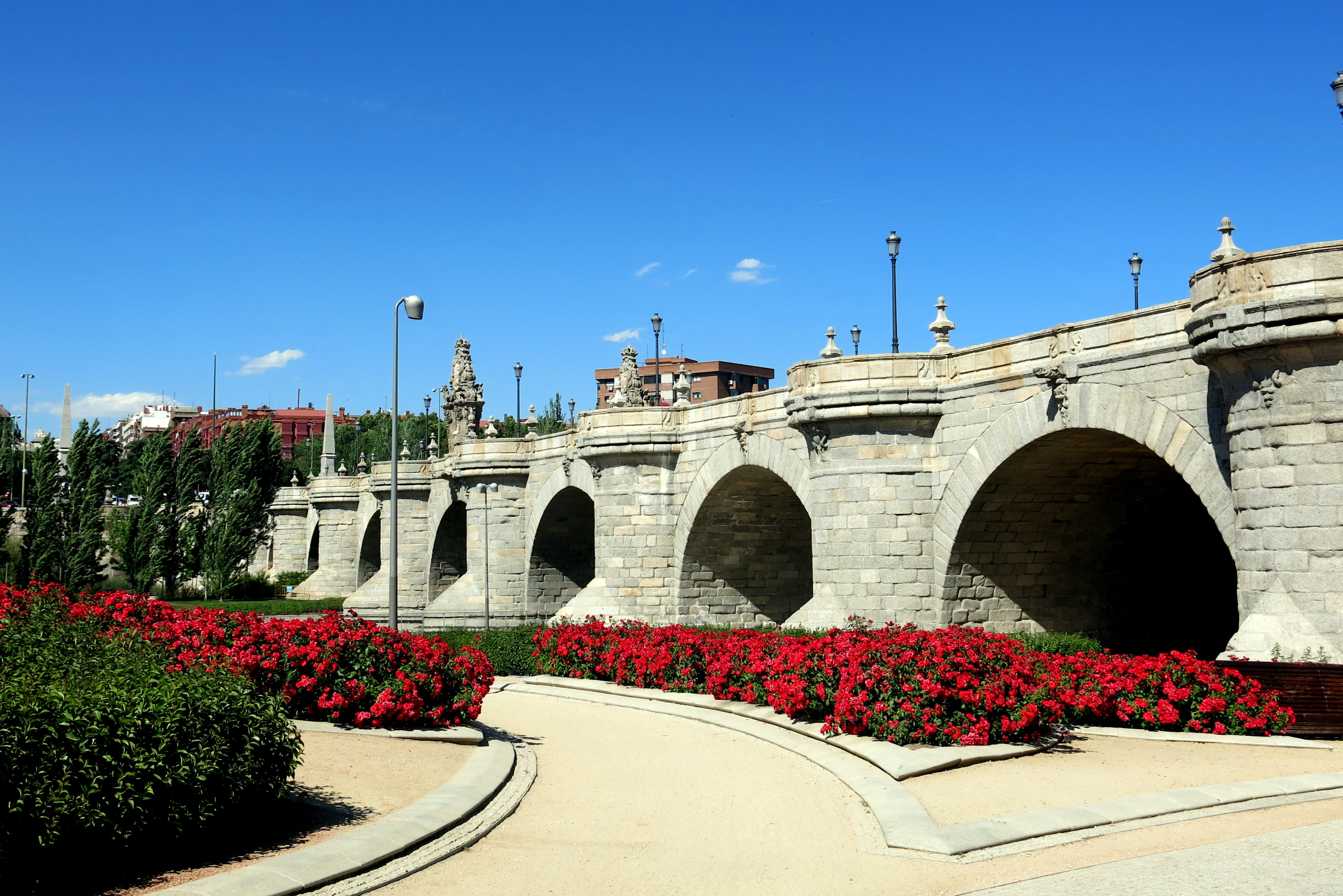
Bridge of Toledo

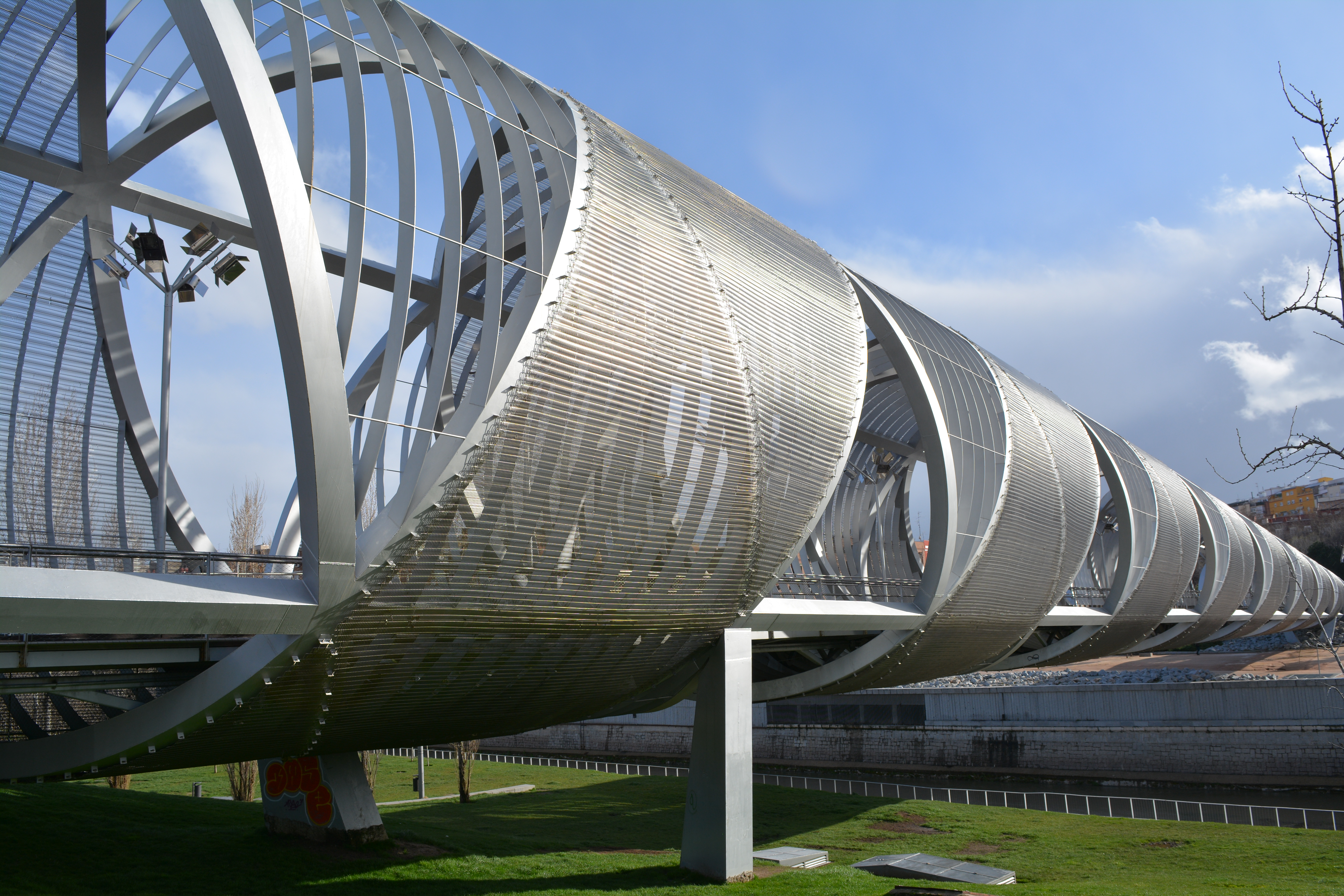
Puente de Arganzuela

During the reign of Philip II, the puente de Segovia, the first important stone bridge across the Manzanares, was built from 1574 to 1584; initially projected by Gaspar de Vega, Juan de Herrera assumed the works and gave a new design to the structure after the decease of the former.

Since the foundation of the city in the 9th century until the 19th century the viajes de agua (viage in Archaic Spanish), following the Persian technology of the Qanat introduced by the Muslims in the Iberian Peninsula in the 8th century, were the single infrastructure for water supply in the city. The viajes comprised a network of draining wells and galleries, a conduction underground gallery and a network for distribution. However the first written mentions of the viajes trace back to the early 13th century, during the Christian period in the Middle Ages. By the middle of the 19th century, the network of viajes extended more than 124 km in length, the most important ones being those of Alto Abroñigal, Bajo Abroñigal, Alcubilla, Amaniel and Fuente Castellana.

In the 19th century, the problems posed by water supply as the population increased, led to the construction of the Canal de Isabel II, bringing to the city the waters from the Lozoya River. It was promoted by Juan Bravo Murillo, a technocrat who implemented crucial developments in the area of Public Works in the country. The project was passed in 1851 and following the completion of the works, the Canal was inaugurated in 1858.

== See also ==
- List of demolished buildings in Madrid
- Spanish architecture
