= Macías =

Surname list

Macías (also spelled Macias) is a Spanish surname found to varying degrees in Europe and Latin America. The first Equatoguinean President, Francisco Macías Nguema, had the surname and was sometimes mononymously called Macías. Within Spain, its frequency is highest in Extremadura, followed by Andalusia, the Canary Islands and Castile and León. In Mexico, there are concentrations found in Los Altos de Jalisco, Tamaulipas, and along the Texas-Mexico border.

There is no singular theory as to the origin of Macías. A long-standing argument over its origin revolves around whether or not it is of a Sephardi origin. Some argue that Macías originates from the Spanish version of the Hebraic term for the Messiah, while others hold that Macías (pronounced [maˈθias] in some areas in Spain) actually is the Spanish version of the Biblical name, Matias or Matthew. Given that the Sephardim used surnames that were in many cases identical to those of their Gentile neighbors, it can be reasoned that certain Macías members were Sephardi without the surname Macias being exclusively Sephardi.

According to (with reference to the heraldic coat of arms): "Dice, Cards, and other Instruments of Amusement.--Gules, three dice in perspective argent, marked (for six in front, three on the sinister side, two on the top) sable, is the coat of Mathias in England; of a family of the same name in France, and of Quintana in Spain. For the former families the allusion is clear to the 'lot' cast by which St. Matthias was chosen to the office of the Apostolate. Macías, in Spain, similarly bears: Gules, six dice (two, two, and two) all marked for sixes sabel (Piferrer, Nobiliario de España, vol. ii., No. 1113)."

== Geographical distribution ==
As of 2014, 43.8% of all known bearers of the surname Macías were residents of Mexico (frequency 1:703), 17.1% of Ecuador (1:230), 13.2% of the United States (1:6,772), 8.8% of Spain (1:1,314), 6.3% of Colombia (1:1,873), 2.3% of Cuba (1:1,229), 1.8% of Argentina (1:5,917) and 1.8% of Venezuela (1:4,269).

In Spain, the frequency of the surname was higher than national average (1:1,314) in the following regions:

1. Extremadura (1:346)
2. Andalusia (1:575)
3. Canary Islands (1:882)
4. Castile and León (1:1,309)

In Ecuador, the frequency of the surname was higher than national average (1:230) in the following provinces:

1. Manabí (1:52)
2. Los Ríos (1:105)
3. Guayas (1:179)
4. Santo Domingo de los Tsáchilas (1:184)
5. Esmeraldas (1:214)

In Mexico, the frequency of the surname was higher than national average (1:703) in the following states:

1. Aguascalientes (1:73)
2. Zacatecas (1:204)
3. Jalisco (1:231)
4. Colima (1:305)
5. Coahuila (1:358)
6. Durango (1:373)
7. Chihuahua (1:384)
8. Nayarit (1:386)
9. Guanajuato (1:459)
10. Baja California (1:478)
11. Nuevo León (1:594)

== People ==
- Macías (troubadour), 14th-century Galician troubadour

=== A ===
- Adriana Castelán Macías (born 1983), Mexican politician
- Alejandro Pérez Macías (born 1975), Mexican football manager
- Alma Hilda Medina Macías (born 1976), Mexican politician
- Amalia Macías, Mexican singer
- Amanda Macias, American journalist
- Anthony Macias (born 1971), American mixed martial artist
- Antonio Macías del Real (1866–1939), Spanish writer
- Ayumi Macías (born 1997), Mexican swimmer

=== B ===
- Bianca Jagger (née Pérez-Mora Macías, born 1945), Nicaraguan social and human rights advocate

=== C ===
- Carlos Fuentes Macías (1928–2012), Mexican writer
- Carlos Jiménez Macías (born 1950), Mexican politician
- Carlos Manuel Urzúa Macías (1955–2024), Mexican economist
- Carlos Tello Macías (1938–2024), Mexican economist
- Carlos Macias Arellano (1931–?), Mexican politician

=== D ===
- Daniela Macías (born 1997), Peruvian badminton player
- David Macias, American professional baseball coach
- Drew Macias (born 1983), American former professional baseball outfielder
- Dení Ramírez Macías (born 1978), Mexican biologist

=== E ===
- Elva Macias (born 1944), Mexican poet
- Emilio Macias, Filipino politician (1933–2010)
- Gaston Ghrenassia (born 1938), known as Enrico Macias, Algerian-French singer

=== F ===
- Francisco Macías Nguema (1924–1979), 1st president of Equatorial Guinea
- Francisco Macías Valadéz, former international commissioner of the Asociación de Scouts de México, Asociación Civil
- Gonzalo Macías (c. 1509–?), Spanish conquistador

=== G ===
- Guillermo Álvarez Macías (1919–1976), Mexican businessman

=== I ===
- Isabel Macías, Spanish athlete
- Ivana Baquero Macías (born 1994), Spanish actress

=== J ===
- Javier Guízar Macías (born 1964), Mexican politician
- Jesús Gónzález Macías (born 1972), Mexican politician
- Jorge Macías (born 1984), Mexican football manage
- José Macías (born 1972), Panamanian retired utility man
- José Macías Santana (1925–2016), Spanish politician from Telde (Canary islands)
- José Juan Macías (born 1999), Mexican professional footballer
- José Natividad Macías (1857–1948), Mexican attorney
- José Ulises Macías Salcedo (1940–2026), Mexican Roman Catholic archbishop
- Saint Juan Macias (1585–1645), 17th-century Spanish Dominican, died in Peru
- Juan Carlos Macías (born 1945), Argentine filmmaker
- Juan José Serrano Macías (born 1981), commonly known as Juanjo, Spanish former footballer
- Evelina Orellana (1908–1986), commonly known as Julia Evelina Macías Lopera, Ecuadorian actress
- Julio Macias (born 1990), Mexican actor

=== L ===
- Leandro Macías (born 1990), Cuban male volleyball player
- Lucas Macías Navarro (born 1978), Spanish oboist
- Luciano Macías (1935–2022), Ecuadorian former soccer player
- Luis Macias (born 1985), Ecuadorian football forward
- Luis Fernando Macías (born 1982), Mexican former professional cyclist
- Luis Antonio Macías Lozano (born 1972), Mexican former professional football defender

=== M ===
- Manuel Macías y Casado (1844–1937), governor of Puerto Rico
- Marcelo Macías (born 1975), Uruguayan football goalkeeper
- Marco Macías (born 1985), Mexican male volleyball player
- Mario Antonio Macias (born 1985), Mexican professional boxer
- Marisol Macías (c. 1972–2011), Mexican newspaper editor
- Mónica Macías (born 1972), Equatoguinean author

=== N ===
- Napoleón Macías (?–1979), Salvadoran Roman Catholic priest

=== O ===
- Oscar Macías (disambiguation), multiple people

=== P ===
- Patrick Macias (born 1972), American author
- Pauline Macias, American Mixed Martial Arts fighter
- Pere Macias (born 1956), Spanish politician
- Paulo E. Macías Sabando (born 1912), Ecuadorian Academic

=== R ===
- Rafael Macias, American politician
- Raquel del Rosario Macías (born 1982), Spanish singer
- Raúl Macías (1934–2009), Mexican professional boxer
- Raúl Macías Sandoval (born 1942), Mexican politician
- Raúl Macías (born 1988), Mexican writer Official biographer of Marco Antonio Solís
- Ray Macias (born 1986), American former professional ice hockey defenseman
- Ricardo Macías Picavea (1847–1899), Spanish writer, journalist, and philosopher
- Rómulo Salazar Macías (born 1951), Mexican politician
- María del Rosario Green Macías (1941–2017), Mexican politician

=== S ===
- Sofía Macias (born 1984), Mexican entrepreneur

=== T ===
- Teodoro Macias, American perpetrator of the 2021 Colorado Springs shooting
- Tommy Macias (born 1993), Swedish judoka
- Trinidad Macías (born 1942), Mexican volleyball player

=== U ===
- Uriel Macias (born 1994), American soccer player

=== V ===
- Víctor Macías, Ecuadorian footballer

=== W ===
- Wilson Macías (born 1965), Ecuadorian footballer

=== X ===
- Xabier Macias Virgós (born 1958), Spanish psychologist

== See also ==
- Macia (name), variant of Macías
