= Macia (name) =

Macia or Macià is a name of Spanish origin. In Catalan, Macià is a variant of the given name Maties. In Spanish, Macía is a variant of the surname Macias.

== People with the given name ==
- Macià Alavedra (1934–2018), Spanish politician

== People with the surname ==
- Antonio Macia, American screenwriter and actor
- Ariel Macia (born 1970), Argentine footballer
- Eduardo Macià (born 1974), Spanish football recruiter
- Francesc Macià (1859–1933), Spanish Army officer and President of Catalonia
- José Macia (born 1935), better known as Pepe, Brazilian footballer and manager
- Mariel Maciá (born 1980), Argentine-Spanish filmmaker
- Mido Macia (c. 1985–2013), Mozambican immigrant murdered by South African police officers
- Oswaldo Maciá (born 1960), Colombian–British sculptor
- Salvador Maciá (1855–1929), Argentine doctor and politician
- Silvia Maciá (born 1972), American marine biologist

== See also ==
- Macia, a town in Gaza Province, Mozambique
- Maciá, a village and municipality in Entre Ríos Province, Argentina
- Macías, a Spanish surname
- Mecia, a given name
