= José Macías (disambiguation) =

José Macías is a Panamanian retired utility man.

José Macías may also refer to:

- José Juan Macías (born 1999), Mexican professional footballer
- José Ulises Macías Salcedo (1940–2026), Mexican Roman Catholic archbishop
- José Natividad Macías (1857–1948), Mexican attorney
