= Alfonso Martínez de Toledo =

Castilian poet and writer

Alfonso Martínez de Toledo (ca. 1398 – ca. 1470), known as the Archpriest of Talavera (Arcipreste de Talavera), was a Castilian poet and writer. He was born and studied in Toledo, Spain, spent time in Catalonia and Aragón, and served as a prebendary at the cathedral of Toledo. He then became archpriest at Talavera.

He wrote two hagiographies, Vida de San Isidoro (Life of Saint Isidore) and Vida de San Ildefonso (Life of Saint Ildephonsus), as well as the historical compilation Atalaya de las crónicas.

== Corbacho ==
Martinez wrote the work known as Corbacho o Reprobación del amor mundano (1438), inspired by Boccaccio's Corbaccio (dated to either 1355 or 1365). Martínez's Corbacho is his best known work. It consists of four parts, the first of which is a treatise against lust; the second, a satire lampooning women of all social stations; the third and fourth, the complexions of human beings and their varying amatory inclinations. Phlegmatic men were "lazy and negligent... neither with a propensity to neither laugh nor cry… taciturn, solitary, half-mute... suspicious..." In it he describes the personalities of men of varying complexions: Melancholic men "have no sense of temperance in anything they do, and only bang their head against the wall. They're very iniquitous, petulant, miserable..."

Martínez employs bombastic language Latinized by the device known as hyperbaton, and also employs rhymed prose and homeoteleuton. The value of this work resides in the fact that Martínez also employed vernacular language, capturing popular and colloquial speech, thus making his work a precursor to La Celestina.

The first part of Corbacho is focused on earthly love, which Martínez rejects by pointing out all of its pitfalls. In the second part, Martínez applies his arguments against earthly love to a criticism of women in general, repeating such stock arguments, for example, that women are the source of man's perdition. Martínez's chapter titles alone indicate only too well his opinions on the opposite sex: "How a woman is jealous of anyone more beautiful than she," "How a woman is disobedient," "How a woman lies even while under oath," "How a man should watch out for a drunken woman," "How a woman loves whomever she pleases regardless of age."

Juan Rodríguez de la Cámara's Triunfo de las donas (1445) includes 40 feminist arguments meant to counter the misogyny of Martínez's Corbacho. Rodríguez's work presents arguments for the superiority of women to men.
