= Constitution of Mexico =

Political Constitution of the United Mexican States
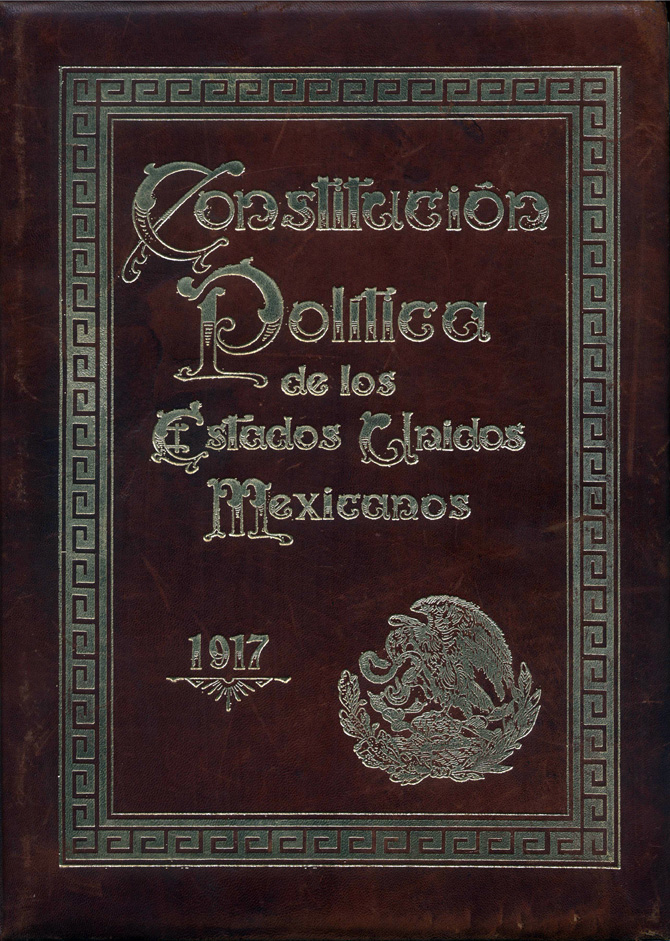
- Cover of the original copy of the Constitution

Overview
- Jurisdiction: Mexico
- Ratified: 5 February 1917; 109 years ago
- System: Constitutional presidential republic

Government structure
- Branches: 3
- Chambers: Bicameral (Senate and Chamber of Deputies)
- Executive: President
- Federalism: Yes
- Electoral college: Only in cases of permanent or absolute absence of the President, the General Congress elects an acting president when necessary; Deputies validated presidential elections until 1993.
- First legislature: 15 April 1917
- First executive: 1 May 1917
- Location: Lecumberri Palace
- Author: Constituent Congress of 1917
- Supersedes: Constitution of 1857

Wikisource
- Mexico's dilemma/Appendix B

The current Constitution of Mexico, formally the Political Constitution of the United Mexican States (Spanish: Constitución Política de los Estados Unidos Mexicanos), was drafted in Santiago de Querétaro, in the State of Querétaro, Mexico, by a constituent convention during the Mexican Revolution. It was approved by the Constituent Congress on 5 February 1917, and was later amended several times. It is the successor to the Constitution of 1857, and earlier Mexican constitutions. "The Constitution of 1917 is the legal triumph of the Mexican Revolution. To some it is the revolution."

The current Constitution of 1917 is the first such document in the world to set out social rights, preceding the Russian Soviet Federative Socialist Republic Constitution of 1918 and the Weimar Constitution of 1919. Some of the most important provisions are Articles 3, 27, and 123; adopted in response to the armed insurrection of popular classes during the Mexican Revolution, these articles display profound changes in Mexican politics that helped frame the political and social backdrop for Mexico in the twentieth century. Article 3 established the basis for free, mandatory, and secular education; Article 27 laid the foundation for land reform in Mexico; and Article 123 was designed to empower the labor sector, which had emerged in the late nineteenth century and which supported the winning faction of the Mexican Revolution.

Articles 3, 5, 24, 27, and 130 seriously restricted the Catholic Church in Mexico, and attempts to enforce the articles strictly by President Plutarco Calles (1924–1928) in 1926 led to the violent conflict known as the Cristero War.

In 1992, under the administration of Carlos Salinas de Gortari, there were significant revisions of the constitution, modifying Article 27 to strengthen private property rights, allow privatization of ejidos and end redistribution of land, and the articles restricting the Catholic Church in Mexico were largely repealed.

Constitution Day (Día de la Constitución) is one of Mexico's annual Fiestas Patrias (public holidays), commemorating the promulgation of the Constitution on 5 February 1917. The holiday is held on the first Monday of February.

== Essential principles ==
The constitution was founded on seven fundamental ideals:

- A declaration of rights
- Sovereignty of the nation
- Separation of powers
- Representative government
- Federalism
- Constitutional remedy
- Supremacy of the State over the Church

== Organization ==
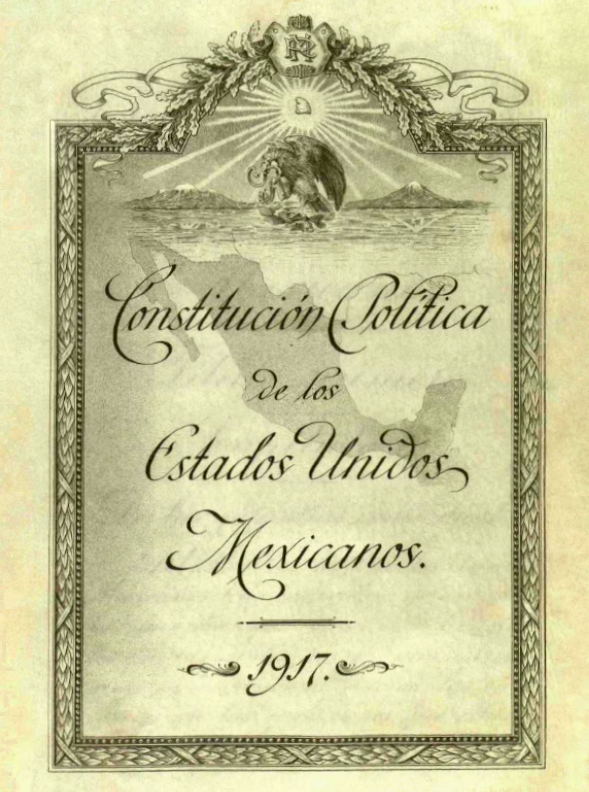
Original inside cover of the Political Constitution of the United Mexican States

The Constitution is divided into "Titles" (Títulos) which are series of articles related to the same overall theme. The Titles, of variable length, are:

First Title:

- Chapter I: Of Human Rights and their Guarantees (Capítulo I: de los Derechos Humanos y sus Garantías)
- Chapter II: On Mexicans (Capítulo II: de los Mexicanos)
- Chapter III, On Foreigners (Capítulo III: de los Extranjeros)
- Chapter IV: On Mexican Citizens (Capítulo IV: de los Ciudadanos Mexicanos)

Second Title:

- Chapter I: On National Sovereignty and Form of Government (Capítulo I, de la Soberanía Nacional y de la Forma de Gobierno)
- Chapter II: On the Parts That Make Up the Federation and the National Territory (Capítulo II, de las Partes Integrantes de la Federación y del Territorio Nacional)

Third Title:

- Chapter I: On the Separation of Powers (Capítulo I, de la División de Poderes)
- Chapter II: On the Legislative Power (Capítulo II, del Poder Legislativo)
- Chapter III: On the Executive Power (Capítulo III, del Poder Ejecutivo)
- Chapter IV: On the Judicial Power (Capítulo IV, del Poder Judicial)

Fourth Title:

- About the responsibilities of the public service and the patrimony of the State (De las responsabilidades de los servidores públicos y patrimonial del Estado)

Fifth Title:

- About the States of the Federation and the Federal District (De los estados de la Federación y del Distrito Federal)

Sixth Title:

- About Work and Social Welfare (Del Trabajo y la Previsión Social)

Seventh Title:

- General Provisions (Prevenciones Generales)

Eighth Title

- About Reforms to the Constitution (De las Reformas a la Constitución)

Ninth Title:

- About the Inviolability of the Constitution (De la Inviolabilidad de la Constitución)

== History ==
=== Constitutionalists and the idea of a new constitution ===
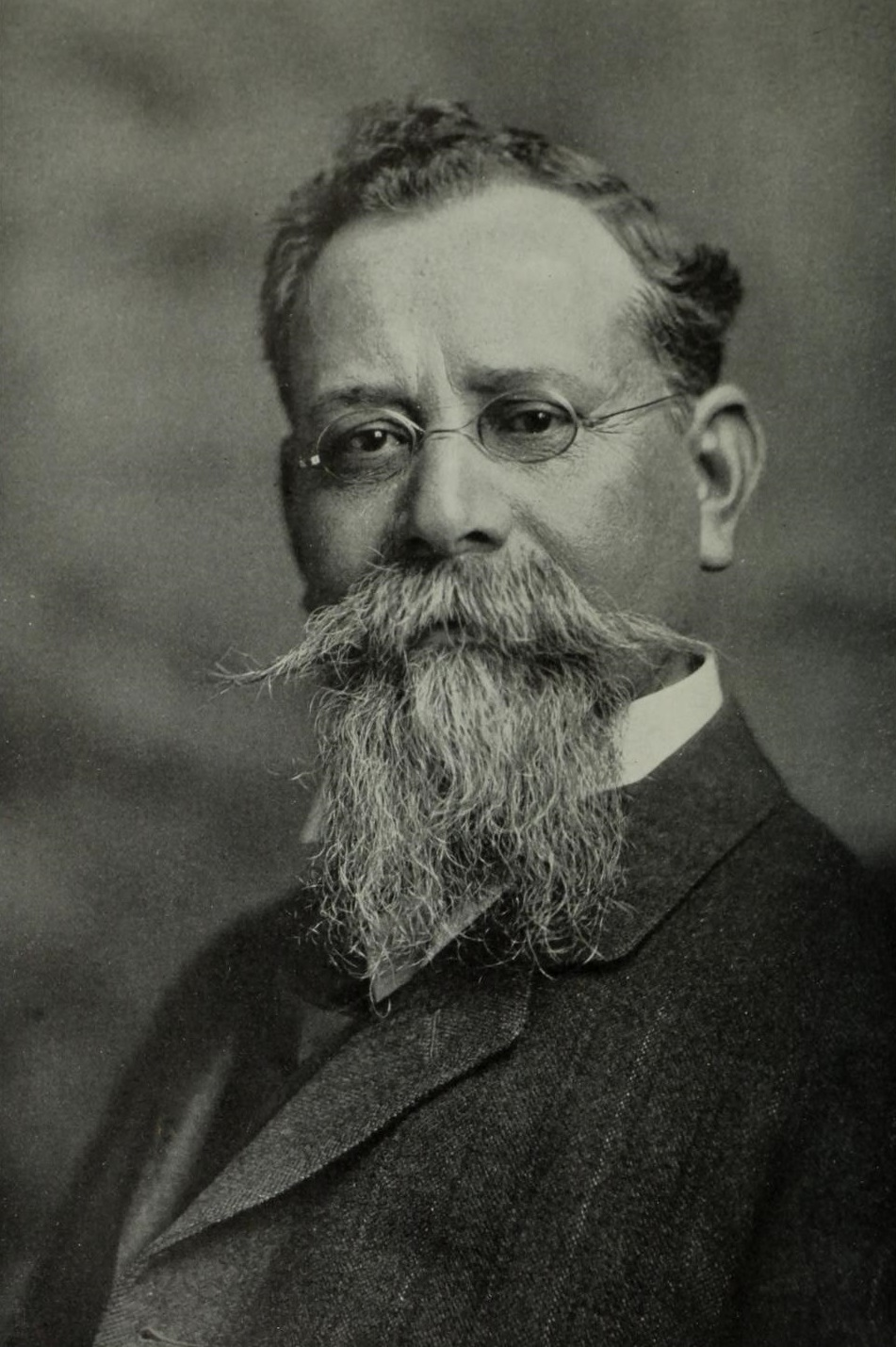
Venustiano Carranza, leader of the victorious faction, convoked the elected body to draft the new constitution.

The Political Constitution of the United Mexican States is one of the major outcomes of the Mexican Revolution that started in 1910 and won by the Constitutionalist faction led by Venustiano Carranza. Carranza's Constitutionalist coalition invoked the liberal 1857 Constitution to unite Mexicans against the regime of General Victoriano Huerta, who had come to power by a coup in February 1913. The revolutionaries fought for causes that were beyond the political bounds of the 1857 Constitution. Various political plans articulated demands for socio-economic reform. Carranza's Constitutionalist faction emerged victorious in 1915, having defeated Huerta's regime and then the bloody civil war between the revolutionary faction of Pancho Villa and Emiliano Zapata. Historian Alan Knight contends that the new constitution was "a means to confer legitimacy on a shaky regime."

Carranza initially envisioned revisions to the 1857 Constitution that would incorporate the demands for which revolutionaries fought. Carranza's 1913 Plan of Guadalupe and its subsequent updates did not include demands for a new constitution, but his advisors persuaded him that the best way forward was a new constitution rather than a piecemeal revision of the earlier Constitution. He had initially floated the idea of a constitutional convention in September 1913, but had not pursued the idea in the thick of revolutionary struggle, but once he had consolidated power, he formally and publicly articulated the idea. Writing in February 1915, he stated "When peace is established, I shall convoke a Congress duly elected by all people which shall have the character of a congreso constituyente for raising constitutional precepts the reforms dictated during the struggle." Félix Palavicini persuaded Carranza that a new constitution was the best way to return to rule of law, through a new governing document. Carranza agreed, allowing Palavicini to launch a press campaign to win over Mexicans, and especially the revolutionary army generals, to the idea.

Palavicini argued that incorporating revolutionary reforms into a new constitution would give them firm standing in the present and future that could be overturned easily. Once a new legislature was convened, legislators could more effect reforms efficiently since they were part of the constitution already. The Constitution of 1857 had subordinated the executive branch to the legislative, in an attempt to curtail the power of strong presidents. The liberal general Porfirio Díaz when president for more than three decades made the legislature and the courts subordinate to his executive power while the Constitution of 1857 remained in effect in theory, but not in practice. Palavicini argued that the process of amending the constitution would be time-consuming and piecemeal. Since the multiple major revolutionary reforms were not part of the 1857 Constitution, adding them would entail further complexity. A new constitution drafted by elected delegates would give legitimacy to the new charter, arguing for a constituent congress. Although there was some resistance to the idea, the revolutionaries recognized the "right of revolution", that having won the conflict, the victors could have their way in creating the new document.

=== Constitutional Convention ===
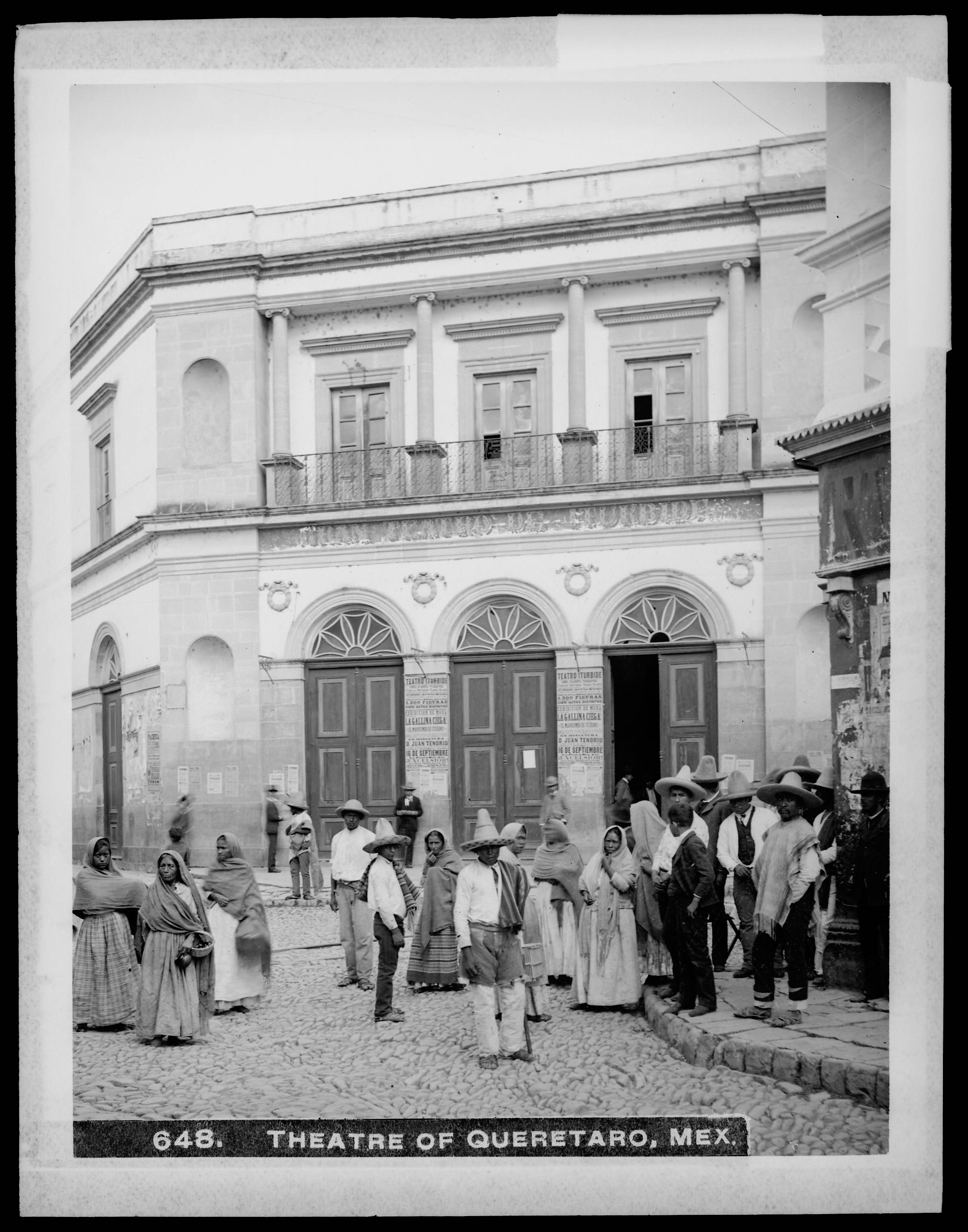
Teatro Iturbide, Querétaro, where the congress was held

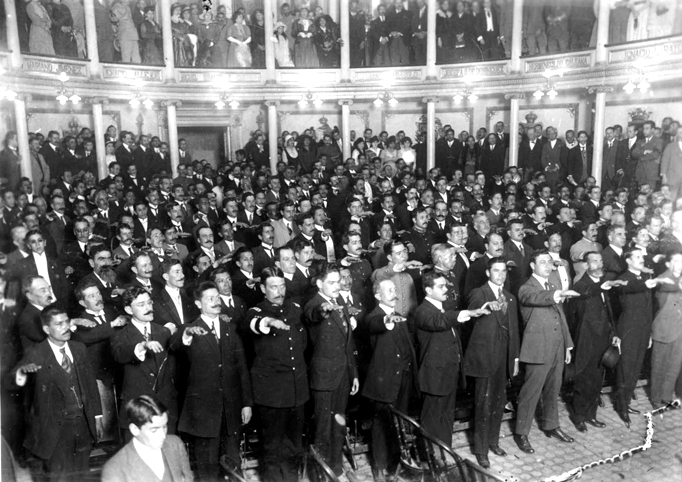
The new constitution was approved on 5 February 1917. This photo shows the Constituent Congress of 1917 swearing fealty to the newly created Constitution.

Carranza convoked a congress specifically to revise the liberal constitution of 1857, but the process created a more sweeping, new document. The Constitution was drafted in Querétaro, not the capital. Carranza chose the site because it was where Emperor Maximilian of Mexico was executed, bringing to an end the Second French Intervention in 1867. Another view is that Mexico City was too conservative and Carranza chose the provincial capital of Querétaro because it was a quiet, peaceful place for such an important meeting. The congress formally opened in November 1916, with delegate elections and then a credentials fight preceding that; the final draft was approved on 5 February 1917.

Unlike the earlier congresses that produced the 1824 Mexican Constitution and the 1857 Constitution over a lengthy period, the Constituent Congress produced the final draft in a matter of a few months, between November 1916 and February 1917. According to Alan Knight, the immediacy with which the document was drafted and Carranza's acceptance of some radical provisions "suggests that what Carranza and his colleagues chiefly wanted was a Constitution, the hypothetical contents of which could be later reviewed, rewritten and ignored (all of which happened)." Another factor may have been that the forces of General Pancho Villa remained an active threat to the Constitutionalist regime. In December 1916, Villa captured the important city of Torreón, which historian Adolfo Gilly contends "revealed the still-hot embers of peasant war and mass discontent with the whole reactionary policy followed by Carranza in 1916."

==== Delegates ====
Delegates to the congress were to be elected, with one per jurisdiction that had existed in 1912, when congressional elections had been held during the Francisco I. Madero presidency. Those who had been "hostile to the Constitutionalist Cause" were banned from participating, but voting was by universal manhood suffrage. Carranza was pressured to amnesty those who had been hostile as well as allow those who had gone into exile to return to Mexico, but he refused. Carranza excluded the villista and zapatista factions from this congress; however, the demands, and political pressure, of these factions pushed the delegates to adopt social demands not originally in Carranza's plan –i.e. articles 27 and 123 that spoke to the demands of peasants and workers who had fought for their rights.

The membership of the Congress was not representative of all regions, classes, or political stripes in Mexico. The 220 delegates were all Carrancistas, since the Constitutionalist faction had been victorious militarily; but that did not mean they were of one mind. Most delegates were middle class, not workers or peasants. Middle class professionals predominated, with lawyers, teachers, engineers, doctors, and journalists. A small but significant group of delegates were revolutionary generals, including Francisco José Múgica and Candido Aguilar, Carranza's son-in-law. The predominantly civilian composition of the Constituent Congress was in contrast with the place of real power in revolutionary Mexico, which was in the military. Most senior generals did not participate directly in the congress. An exception was Álvaro Obregón backing the progressive faction, although indirectly. "Of the members of the high command, it was Obregón who best understood that military victory had to be consolidated through major concessions to crucial revolutionary forces." Historian of the Querétaro convention, E.V. Niemeyer, compiled a roster of delegates, with the names of delegates and information on the age, state from which delegates were elected, and their occupation, profession, or military rank. Villa's home state of Chihuahua had only one delegate., while Morelos, Zapata's home state, had two. Enrique Krauze, in his book Biography of Power, states the Constituent Congress contained 85 conservatives and centrists close to Carranza's brand of liberalism, and 132 more radical delegates.

An important group of delegates elected to the congress were the "Bloc Renovador", who had been elected in 1912 to the Mexican legislature during Madero's presidency. Some considered them tainted for their continuing to serve during Victoriano Huerta's regime (February 1913-July 1914). Although some had voted to accept Madero's forced resignation from the presidency, in a failed move to save his life, this group had blocked Huerta's moves in the legislature to the point that in October 1913 Huerta dissolved congress and ruled as a dictator. Some congressmen fled Mexico, others were jailed by Huerta. With the Constitutionalist victory, some Renovadores, namely Alfonso Cravioto, José Natividad Macías, Félix F. Palavicini, and Luis Manuel Rojas, were now ready to serve in the Constituent Congress to draft the new constitution. There was opposition to them from other Carrancistas for their history of serving in the Huerta regime and those opponents attempted to block their being seated as delegates. Carranza supported the Renovadores, saying he had instructed them to continue serving in Congress during the Huerta regime as a way to gather information about the regime and to block its attempts to act constitutionally. At the Constituent Congress, there were bitter fights over the seating of particular delegates, so that the division between the Renovadores and a more radical group of leftists (sometimes called Obregonistas) was sharp even before the congress actually opened. The most bitter fight was over the seating of Palavicini, which was finally settled in a closed session. Carranza's foreign minister and son-in-law, revolutionary General Cándido Aguilar, brought the matter to conclusion by saying that the Constituent Congress was losing time with the debate of Palavincini, while Villa remained strong in Chihuahua and the United States might intervene in Mexico to oppose the new constitution.

==== Carranza's draft constitution ====
Carranza himself submitted a full draft revision of the constitution on 1 December 1916, but the proposed revisions "reflected little of the turmoil that had been going on for the past four years. It was indeed simply a rewording and reorganization of the Constitution of 1857." Carranza's advisers who had prepared the draft expected that it "would serve as a starting point for the constituyentes discussions," and that "no one should lose sight of the profound change taking place in our fundamental institutions." There is evidence that the "people of Mexico City were cynical: they expected the congress to rubber stamp the draft presented to it by Carranza." Delegates read Carranza's draft, but did not accept the document that only made minor revisions to the 1857 Constitution.

=== Debates ===
The most highly contentious discussions were over the articles dealing with education and with the Catholic Church, while the more "revolutionary" articles on the state's power to expropriate and distribute resources (Article 27) and the rights of labor (Article 123) passed easily. Although the Constituent Congress has been characterized as a polarized battle of "moderate" and "radical" delegates, Carranza's advisers expected his draft to be revised. In the words of one scholar it was "mauled." The drafting of the two most revolutionary articles was by a small committee and the congress voted unanimously in favor within hours of their presentation. Pastor Rouaix was the guiding hand behind the final versions of both Article 123, passed first, and Article 27. The initial draft of Article 27 was done by Andrés Molina Enríquez, author of influential 1909 work, The Great National Problems.

==== Anticlericalism ====
Article 3, dealing with education, was highly contentious. Carranza's draft of Article 3 reads "There is to be full liberty of instruction, but that given in official educational establishments will be secular, and the instruction imparted by these institutions will be free at both the upper and lower levels." Francisco Múgica proposed a much more strongly worded alternative. "There will be liberty of instruction; but that given in official establishments of education will be secular, as will be the upper and lower primary instruction given in private schools. No religious corporation, ministry of any cult, or any person belonging to a similar association may establish or direct schools of primary instruction, nor give instruction in any school [colegio]. Private primary schools may be established only subject to the supervision of the Government. Primary instruction will be obligatory for all Mexicans, and in official establishments it will be free."

There were significant debates on the anticlerical articles of the constitution. The liberal Constitution of 1857 already restricted the Catholic Church as an institution, but the constitutional revision went even further. The 1914 Convention of Aguascalientes had already brought together victorious revolutionary factions, including Constitutionalists, Zapatistas, and Villistas, but discussions there did not center on anticlericalism. However, the 1916–1917 constitutional congress had lengthy and heated debates over anticlericalism. A contention that fits the content of the debates is that for Constitutionalists anticlericalism was a nationalist rather than religious issue. The Catholic Church as an institution was seen to be antiliberal and antinationalist, so that "the Catholic Church was an enemy of Mexican sovereignty and an obstacle to the triumph of liberalism and progress." From this ideological viewpoint, the implementation of the Catholic Church's agenda "was exercised through its control of education, oral confession, etc."

It has been argued that Article 3 and Article 130 restricted the Catholic Church as a consequence of the support given by the Mexican Church's hierarchy to Victoriano Huerta's dictatorship, It has been argued that the Revolution did not begin in 1910 with anticlericalism as a significant issue, but emerged as one only after the victory of the Constitutionalist faction. The anticlericalism of the Constitutionalists was a part of their aim to build a strong nation-state. "[D]elegates viewed the church as a political enemy to the establishment of a liberal, secular nation-state...The church seemed to be viewed by most of the delegates as a foreign body that worked against the development of a progressive and independent nation." Rather than anticlericalism being a religious stance, in this interpretation "the militant anti-church stance of the congress was another expression of nationalism." But the Catholic Church had strongly supported the Huerta regime, so that the anticlerical articles in the Constitution are the negative consequences of that.

==== Land reform and natural resources ====
The question of the state's power over natural resources was articulated in Article 27, which enabled the government to implement land reform and exert control over its subsoil resources, particularly oil. Article 27 states in particular that foreign citizens cannot own land at the borders or coasts as a consequence of the United States occupation of Veracruz, In the assessment of historian Frank Tannenbaum

The Constitution was written by the soldiers of the Revolution, not the lawyers, who were there, but were generally the opposition. On all the crucial issues the lawyers voted against the majority of the Convention. The majority was in the hands of the soldiers -- generals, colonels, majors -- men who had marched and counter-marched across the Republic and fought its battles... The soldiers wanted, as General [Francisco] Múgica said to me, to socialize property. But they were frightened -- afraid of their own courage, of their own ideas. They found all of the learned men in the Convention opposed to them. Article 27 was a compromise.

==== Labor rights ====
A major victory for organized labor was the enshrining of labor rights in the Constitution. Labor had played an important role in the Constitutionalist victory, and this was its reward in Article 123. The labor article was drafted by a small committee of the congress, headed by Pastor Rouaix and José Natividad Macías. The Program of the Liberal Party of Mexico made demands for protections for labor, that were incorporated into the labor article.

==== Women's suffrage ====
The congress debated extending the vote to Mexican women. There were very active women's suffrage movements in the U.S. and Britain. While not as strong in Mexico, there were activists for the cause. Hermila Galindo, a strong supporter of Carranza, requested the convention to consider extending the vote to women for representatives for the lower house of the legislature. The request was conveyed to a committee. Article 35 specifying the rights and privileges of Mexican citizens could have been extended to include full rights for women, but the committee went out of its way to explicitly deny women those rights. Carranza was an advocate of women's rights as was his advisor and delegate to the congress, Palavicini. Palavicini questioned the committee chair for not including women's suffrage, but the chair deflected, saying the committee did not take the question of women's suffrage into consideration. In fact, the committee had stated explicitly why they did not extend women the vote. "women ... do not feel the need to participate in public affairs, as is shown by the lack of all organized movement toward that end; ... political rights are not based on the nature of the human being but on the regulatory functions of the State, on the functions that it must exercise in order to maintain the coexistence of natural rights of all; under the conditions in which Mexican society finds itself, the granting of the vote to women is considered unnecessary." Those opposing women's suffrage thought that women were under the influence of the Catholic Church, so enfranchising them would give power to the Church, but this opinion was not explicitly found in the records of the debate. Women would not achieve the vote in Mexico until 1953.

==== Prohibition of alcohol and bullfighting ====
Delegates debated social reforms of popular practices deemed as detrimental to the public health of Mexicans. Prohibition of the manufacture and consumption of alcohol had been included as an amendment to the U.S. Constitution in 1920, repealed in 1933 as a failure, but the idea was in the air. Although Mexican delegates did not think enforcement would be easy, it was argued by proponents that enshrining it in the constitution would give prohibition due respect. It was considered in the draft of Article 4, but resoundingly defeated by delegates 145–7. Article 123 dealing with labor, prohibited sale of alcoholic beverages and the establishment of gambling houses in workers' centers, so further debates on prohibition had a chance of passage. Arguments for prohibition were voiced over the loss of revenues that taxing taverns and drink brought in, its contribution to criminality, and undermining public health. In the end, prohibition of alcohol generally was not incorporated into the constitution. Delegate General Múgica made an all-out effort to include the ban, but realized it would not pass. An attempt to prohibit bullfighting was given short shrift, considered a Mexican cultural celebration.

=== Influences ===
Parts of the program of the radical Liberal Party of Mexico (1906) were incorporated into the 1917 Constitution

The Liberal Party of Mexico's (PLM) 1906 political program proposed a number of reforms that were incorporated into the 1917 Constitution. Article 123 incorporated its demands for the 8-hour day, minimum wage, hygienic working conditions, prohibitions on abuse of sharecroppers, payment of wages in cash, not scrip, banning of company stores, and Sunday as an obligatory day of rest. Article 27 of the Constitution incorporated some of the PLM's demands for land reform in Mexico. Requiring landowners to make all their land productive, and if left idle, subject to government expropriation; the granting of a fixed amount of land to anyone who asks for it, provided they bring it into production and not sell it. Points in the PLM's call for improvement in education were also incorporated, such as completely secular education, compulsory attendance up until age 14, and the establishment of trade schools. Not surprisingly, the PLM also called for restrictions on the Catholic Church, which were incorporated in the constitution. These included treating religious institutions as businesses and required to pay taxes; nationalization of religious institutions' real property; and the elimination of religious-run schools.

=== Importance ===
This constitution is the first one in world history to set out social rights, preceding the Russian Constitution of 1918 and the Weimar Constitution of 1919. Articles: 3, 27, and 123 displayed profound changes in Mexican political philosophy that would help frame the political and social backdrop for the rest of the century. Article 3 established the bases for a mandatory and lay education; Article 27 led the foundation for land reform in Mexico as well as asserting state sovereignty over the nation's subsoil rights; and Article 123 was designed to empower the labor sector.

Its innovations were in expanding the Mexican state's power into the realms of economic nationalism, political nationalism, protection of workers' rights, and acknowledgment of peasants' rights to land. In the assessment of E.V. Niemeyer, "In contrast with the reformers of 1857, who first wrote a constitution and then defended it liberal principles on the battlefield, the early twentieth-century revolutionaries fought first and then wrote a new constitution of the land, the Constitution of 1917. In a real sense this document legalized the Mexican Revolution."

The Constitution is a living document, which has been amended a number of times. As with the earlier Constitutions, the enforcement of Constitution of 1917 has varied over the years. The Constitution of 1857 had strong anticlerical articles, but under Díaz the Catholic Church had regained much of its economic power, since he did not enforce the constitutional provisions. The anticlerical articles of the 1917 Constitution were not enforced vigorously until Plutarco Elías Calles became president in 1924, sparking the Cristero War. In the 1990s, President Carlos Salinas de Gortari called for amending the Constitution as Mexico sought to join the North American Free Trade Agreement with the U.S. and Canada. Anticlerical articles were amended as was Article 27 empowering the state over natural resources.

=== Further amendments ===
==== Amendments on presidential terms ====
The constitution was amended in 1926 to allow presidential re-elections as long as the president did not serve consecutive terms. This amendment allowed former president Álvaro Obregón to run for the presidency in 1928, an election he won, but he was assassinated before taking office. The amendment was repealed in 1934.

The Constitution was amended in 1927 to extend the president's term from four years to six years. President Lázaro Cárdenas was the first to serve out a full six-year term, beginning in 1934 and stepping down from power in 1940.

==== Amendment restricting agrarian women's rights ====
One of the major impacts of Article 27 was to empower the government to expropriate property for the good of the nation. This tool was used to break up large landed estates and created ejidos, small-scale, inalienable peasant holdings. In 1927, Article 27 was revised to restrict the rights of peasant women to hold ejidos in their own name, unless they were "the sole support of the family unit." Female holders of ejidos lost their ejido rights if they married another ejidatario. "Essentially, land was viewed as a family resource, with only one ejido membership allotted per family." In 1971, these restrictions were removed via the Ley de Reforma Agraria (Agrarian Reform Law), so that spouses and their children could inherit.

The 1992 amendment to Article 27 that allowed ejidos to be converted to private property and sold were designed to create a market in real estate and allow for the creation of larger, more productive agricultural enterprises. Women were seen to be more vulnerable economically with this change since they were a small proportion of ejidatarios. In practice, in one 2002 study of four different site, despite the change in the law, women (mothers and widows) retained considerable economic status within the family.

==== Anticlerical articles and the 1934 and 1946 Amendments ====
Articles 3, 5, 24, 27, and 130 as originally enacted in 1917 were anticlerical and restricted the role of the Catholic Church in Mexico, as well as other organized churches. Although it has been argued that these restrictions were included in part due to a desire by anticlerical framers to punish the Mexican Church's hierarchy for its support of Victoriano Huerta, the Mexican Constitution of 1857 enacted during the Liberal Reform in Mexico, already significantly curtailed the role of religious institutions.

Article 3 required that education, in both public and private schools be completely secular and free of any religious instruction and prohibited religions from participating in education – essentially outlawing Catholic schools or even religious education in private schools. Article 3 likewise prohibited ministers or religious groups from aiding the poor, engaging in scientific research, and spreading their teachings. The constitution prohibited churches to own property and transferred all church property to the state, thus making all houses of worship state property.

Article 130 denied churches any kind of legal status and allowed local legislators to limit the number of ministers, (essentially giving the state the ability to restrict religious institutions) and banned any ministers not born in Mexico. It denied ministers freedom of association, the right to vote and freedom of speech, prohibiting them and religious publications from criticizing the law or government.

Presidents Venustiano Carranza (1917–1920) and Alvaro Obregón (1920–1924) did not implement the anticlerical articles of the constitution, which was the stance that Porfirio Díaz had taken with the anticlerical articles of the 1857 Constitution and the Catholic Church.

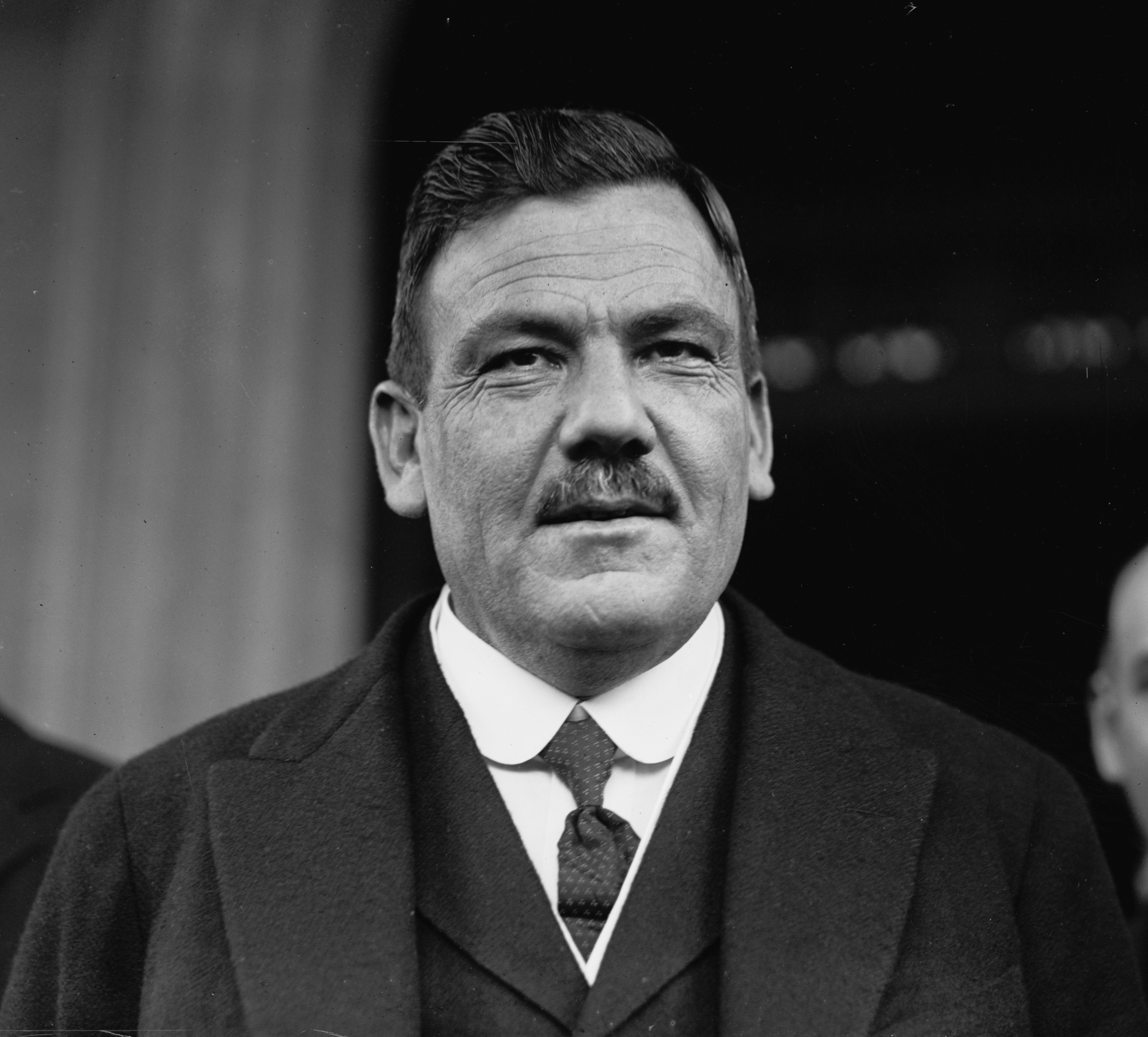
Revolutionary general Plutarco Elías Calles was a fierce anticlerical. When he became president of Mexico in 1924, he began enforcing the constitutional restrictions on the Catholic Church, leading to the Cristero War (1926–29)

Starting in 1926 President Plutarco Elías Calles (1924–1928) sought to enforce them. In 1926 Pope Pius XI, in the encyclical Acerba animi, stated that the anticlerical articles of the constitution were "seriously derogatory to the most elementary and inalienable rights of the Church and of the faithful" and that both he and his predecessor had endeavored to avoid their application by the Mexican government.

The escalation of church-state tensions led to fierce regional violence known as the Cristero War. Some scholars have characterized the constitution in this era as a "hostile" approach to the issue of church and state separation. Although the Cristero War came to an end in 1929, with U.S. Ambassador to Mexico Dwight Morrow acting as mediator between the Mexican government and the hierarchy of the Catholic Church, the end of the violent conflict did not result in constitutional changes.

The constitution was made even more anticlerical from 1934 to 1946, when an amendment mandating socialist education was in effect. On 13 December 1934 Article 3 now mandated socialist education, which "in addition to removing all religious doctrine" was to "combat fanaticism and prejudices", "build[ing] in the youth a rational and exact concept of the universe and of social life". In 1946 socialist education was formally removed from the constitution and the document returned to the generalized secular education. In practice, however, socialist education ended with President Manuel Avila Camacho, who said at the beginning of his presidential term in 1940 "I am a [religious] believer" (Soy creyente), signaling the end of the enforcement of the anticlerical articles.

The inconsistency in enforcement meant that even though the constitution prohibited any worship outside of a church building, which made Pope John Paul II's outdoor Masses and other religious celebrations during his 1980 and 1990 visits illegal acts, the government turned a blind eye. The anticlerical articles remained in the Constitution until the reforms of 1992.

==== Constitutional reform of anticlerical articles and land reform under Salinas ====
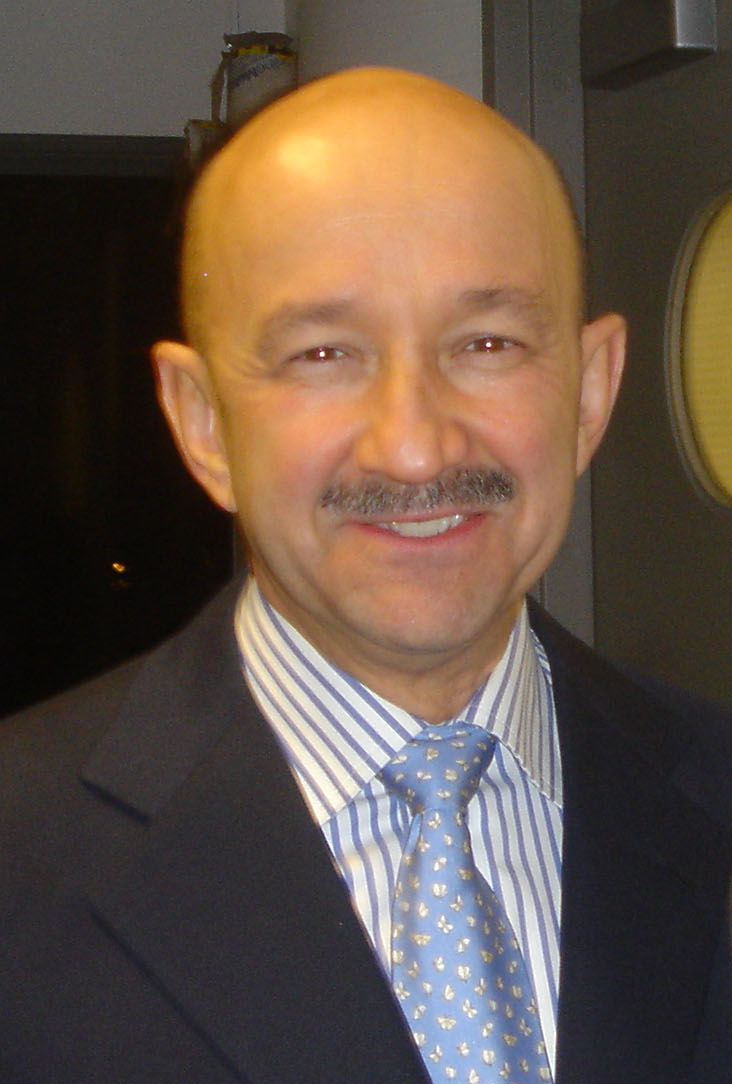
Mexican President Carlos Salinas de Gortari (1988–1994), whose administration significantly amended the 1917 Constitution.

In his inaugural address, President Carlos Salinas de Gortari (1988–1994) announced a program to "modernize" Mexico via structural transformation. "The modern state is a state which ... maintains transparency and updates its relation with political parties, entrepreneurial groups, and the church." His declaration was more an articulation of the direction of change, but not list of specifics.

The implementation of reforms entailed amending the constitution, which required overcoming opposition on the Left as well as in the Catholic Church itself. After considerable debate, the Mexican legislature voted for these fundamental revisions in Church-State policy.

The Constitution of 1917 had several anticlerical restrictions. Article 5 restricted the existence of religious orders; Article 24 restricted church services outside of church buildings; Article 27 which empowered the State over fundamental aspects of property ownership and resulted in expropriation and distribution of lands, while limiting the right to sell communally-held ejido lands, and most famously in 1938, the expropriation of foreign oil companies. Article 27 also prevented churches from holding real property at all. For the Catholic hierarchy, Article 130 prevented the recognition of the Church as a legal entity, denied to clergy the exercise of political rights, and prevented the Church from participating in any way in political matters.

The Church had contested all these restrictions from the beginning. With the possibility of changed relations between Church and State, "the main demand of the Catholic hierarchy was centered on the modification of Article 130" to recognize the Church as a legal entity, restore political rights to priests, and to end restrictions "on the social actions of the Church and its members."

The initial reaction to changing the constitution was quite negative from members of the Institutional Revolutionary Party who saw anticlericalism as an inherent element of post-Revolution Mexico. It was clear that given the contested nature of the 1988 elections that Salinas could not expect to operate with a mandate for his program. However, the debate was now open. Leftists led by Cuauhtémoc Cárdenas opposed any change in the anticlerical articles of the constitution, since they were seen as the foundation for the power of the secular state. However, the National Action Party in alliance with the weakened PRI became allies to move toward fundamental reforms.

The Vatican likely sensed a sea-change in the Mexican ruling party's stance on anticlericalism. In 1990, John Paul II visited Mexico, his first since 1979 for the Puebla conference of Latin American bishops. After the announcement of his intentions, the Mexican Minister of the Interior (Gobernación) stated flatly that the government would not amend Article 130. Nonetheless, the Mexican government began moves to normalize diplomatic relations with the Vatican. The pope's second 1990 trip in May put increased pressure on the Mexican government to take steps toward normalization, particularly after the Vatican and the Soviet Union did so that year. Although Salinas planned a trip to the Vatican in 1991, the Catholic hierarchy in Mexico did not want normalization of relations with the Vatican without discussion of significant changes to the constitution.

An even more significant change came in Salinas's official state of the nation address in November 1991. He stated that "the moment has come to promote new judicial proceedings for the churches," which were impelled by the need "to reconcile the definitive secularization of our society with effective religious freedom." The government proposed changes to the constitution to "respect freedom of religion," but reaffirmed the separation of Church and State, keeping in place secular public education, as well as restrictions on clerics' political participation in civic life and wealth accumulation.

The bill to amend the constitution was submitted to the legislature to reform Articles 3, 5, 24, and 130. The bill passed in December 1991 with the support of the conservative National Action Party (PAN). The enabling legislation was debated far more than the initial bill, but in July 1992, the enabling legislation, Ley de Asociaciones Religiosas y Culto Público (Religious Associations Act), passed 408–10. The leftist Partido Revolucionario Democrático struggled with whether to support this significant change to Mexico's anticlericalism, but most PRD legislators did in the end.

The constitution still does not accord full religious freedom as recognized by the various human rights declarations and conventions. Specifically, outdoor worship is still prohibited and only allowed in exceptional circumstances, generally requiring government permission, religious organizations are not permitted to own print or electronic media outlets, government permission is required to broadcast religious ceremonies, and ministers are prohibited from being political candidates or holding public office.

The end of constitutional support for land reform was part of a larger program of neoliberal economic restructuring that had already been weakening support for ejidal and other forms of small-scale agriculture and negotiation of the North American Free Trade Agreement (NAFTA), and the modifications of Article 27 also permit the privatization and the sale of ejidal land and was a direct cause of the Chiapas conflict.

In 2009, it was reported that changes to the ejidal system have largely failed to improve ejidal productivity. The changes have been implicated as significant contributing factors to worsening rural poverty, forced migration, and the conversion of Mexico, where the cultivation of maize originated, into a net-importer of maize and food in general.

==== Capital punishment and 2005 amendment ====
On 8 November 2005, The Senate of Mexico adopted a final decree amending the Constitution as approved by the majority of the Federated States, modifying Articles 14 and 22 of said Constitution banning the use of capital punishment in its entirety within Mexican territory.

==== Constitutional right to food, 2011 ====
Article 4 and Article 27 were revised to guarantee the right of food In Mexico. "[T]he State has an obligation to guarantee the right [to food]... and to assure sufficient supply of basic foods through integral and sustainable development (Article 27)." The formal language is "Article 4: Every person has the right to adequate food to maintain his or her wellbeing and physical, emotional and intellectual development. The State must guarantee this right." For Article 27, Clause XX, the revision is "Sustainable and integral rural development (...) will also have among its objectives that the State guarantee sufficient and timely supply of basic foods as established by law."

== Selected current articles of the constitution ==
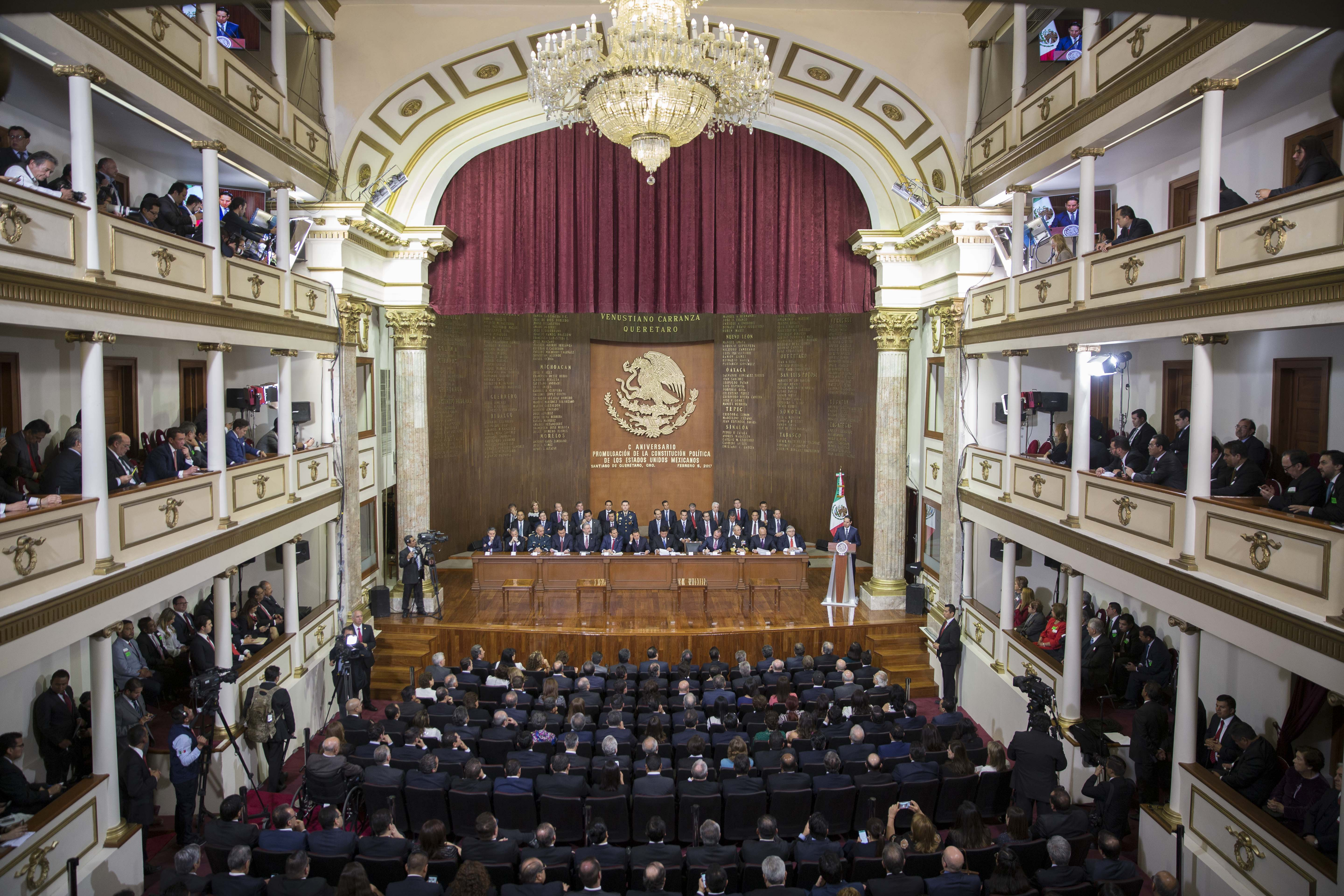
Commemoration of the 100 year anniversary of the Constitution at the Teatro de la República, Santiago de Querétaro on 5 February 2017.

The main ideas or an abstract of the current contents of the articles of the Political Constitution of the United Mexican States is as follows. Not all articles are presented on this page. (See the External links section below for links to the full text in English and Spanish.)

=== Article 1 ===
This article states that every individual in Mexico (official name, Estados Unidos Mexicanos or United Mexican States) has the rights that the Constitution gives. These rights cannot be denied and they cannot be suspended. Slavery is illegal in Mexico; any slaves from abroad who enter national territory will, by this mere act, be freed and given the full protection of the law. All types of discrimination whether it be for ethnic origin, national origin, gender, age, different capacities, social condition, health condition, religion, opinions, sexual preferences, or civil state or any other which attacks human dignity and has as an objective to destroy the rights and liberties of the people are forbidden.

=== Article 2 ===
This article states the nature of the Mexican nation.

The Mexican nation is unique and indivisible. The nation is pluricultural based originally on its indigenous people which are those that are descendants of the people that lived in the current territory of the country at the beginning of the colonization and that preserve their own social, economic, cultural, political institutions. The awareness of their indigenous identity should be fundamental criteria to determine to whom the dispositions over indigenous tribes are applied. They are integral communities of an indigenous tribe that form a social, economic and cultural organization.

=== Article 3 ===
The education imparted by the Federal State shall be designed to develop harmoniously all the faculties of the human being and shall foster in him at the same time a love of country and a consciousness of international solidarity, in independence and justice. Said education must be free of bias. (As per the full definition of the word "laica" as used in the original document).

I. According to the religious liberties established under article 24, educational services shall be secular and, therefore, free of any religious orientation.
II. The educational services shall be based on scientific progress and shall fight against ignorance, ignorance's effects, servitudes, fanaticism and prejudice.

It shall be democratic, considering democracy not only as a legal structure and a political regimen, but as a system of life founded on a constant economic, social, and cultural betterment of the people;

It shall be national insofar as – without hostility or exclusiveness – it shall achieve the understanding of our problems, the utilization of our resources, the defense of our political independence, the assurance of our economic independence, and the continuity and growth of our culture; and it shall contribute to better human relationships, not only with the elements which it contributes toward strengthening and at the same time inculcating, together with respect for the dignity of the person and the integrity of the family, the conviction of the general interest of society, but also by the care which it devotes to the ideals of brotherhood and equality of rights of all men, avoiding privileges of race, creed, class, sex, or persons.

Private persons may engage in education of all kinds and grades. But as regards elementary, secondary, and normal education (and that of any kind or grade designed for laborers and farm workers) they must previously obtain, in every case, the express authorization of the public power. Such authorization may be refused or revoked by decisions against which there can be no judicial proceedings or recourse.

Private institutions devoted to education of the kinds and grades specified in the preceding section must be without exception in conformity with the provisions of sections I and II of the first paragraph of this article and must also be in harmony with official plans and programs.

Religious corporations, ministers of religion, stock companies which exclusively or predominantly engage in educational activities, and associations or companies devoted to the propagation of any religious creed shall not in any way participate in institutions giving elementary, secondary and normal education and education for laborers or field workers. The State may in its discretion withdraw at any time the recognition of official validity of studies conducted in private institutions.

Elementary education shall be compulsory.

All education given by the State shall be free.

The Congress of the Union, with a view to unifying and coordinating education throughout the Republic, shall issue the necessary laws for dividing the social function of education among the Federation, the States and the Municipalities, for fixing the appropriate financial allocations for this public service and for establishing the penalties applicable to officials who do not comply with or enforce the pertinent provisions, as well as the penalties applicable to all those who infringe such provisions.

=== Article 4 ===
All people, men and women, are equal under the law. This article also grants all people protection to their health, a right to housing, and rights for children. Everyone has a right to an appropriate ecosystem for their development & welfare.

=== Article 5 ===
All Citizens of the United Mexican States are free to work in the profession of their choosing, as long as it does not attack the rights of others.

=== Article 6 ===
This article establishes freedom for the expression of ideas with limitations for speech that is morally offensive, infringes on others' rights, or encourages crime or public disorder.

=== Article 7 ===
This article states that no law or authority can "previously" censor the press, or ask for a bail to the authors or printers. The freedom of the press has its limits in respect to private life, morality, and public peace. Incarceration or censorship cannot occur before charges of "press crimes" can be proven, but it can happen when responsibility has been judicially established. In no case shall printers be seized as crimes' instruments.

=== Article 8 ===
Public functionaries and employees will respect the public exercise to their right to petition, as long as it is formulated in writing, in a peaceful and respectful manner. In political petitioning, only citizens of the republic have this right.

=== Article 9 ===
Only citizens of the Republic of Mexico may take part in the political affairs of the country.

=== Article 10 ===
Inhabitants of the Republic may, for their protection, own guns and arms in their homes. Only arms approved by the Army may be owned, and federal law will state the manner in which they can be used. (Firearms are prohibited from importation into the Republic without proper licensing and documentation. Foreigners may not pass the border with unlicensed firearms; the commission of such act is a felony, punishable by prison term. See Gun politics in Mexico.)

=== Article 11 ===
"Everyone has the right to enter the Republic, exit it, travel through its territory, and change his residence without the need of a security card, passport, or any similar device. The exercise of this right will be subordinated to the faculties of judicial authority, in the cases of criminal or civil responsibility, and to the limits of the administrative authorities, on the limits imposed by laws on emigration, immigration, and health safety laws in the Republic, or over foreigners residing in our country."

=== Article 12 ===
The Mexican state does not have a peerage and cannot confer a title of nobility upon any person. (The Mexican Congress does confer awards such as the Order of the Aztec Eagle to notable persons.)

=== Article 13 ===
There are no private courts (i.e.: feudal or manorial courts) in Mexico. Military courts-martial cannot be used to judge civilians.

=== Article 14 ===
Prohibits the enactment of ex post facto (retroactive) laws. All persons punished under the law are entitled to due process, punishments must follow what is dictated by written law. Note that due process under Mexican law is not the same as US law as Mexico is not a common law country.

=== Article 15 ===
Disallows international treaties for extradition when the person to be extradited is politically persecuted, or accused while having the condition of slave, or when the foreign country contravenes the civil rights granted in the Mexican constitution (like the right to life and the abolishment of the death penalty in Article 22).

=== Article 16 ===
"In cases of flagrante delicto, any person may arrest the offender and his accomplices, turning them over without delay to the nearest authorities." In other words, a citizen's arrest is allowed (as distinct from vigilante justice, prohibited in the next article).

=== Article 17 ===
Prohibits vigilante justice, all civil and criminal disputes must be resolved before courts. Mandates speedy trials in both civil and criminal matters. Prohibits levying of "court costs" and fees, judicial service is free to all parties. Courts are to be free and independent. Imprisonment for debts is prohibited. This article makes provisions relating to arrest and imprisonment. The article's emphasis on "social readjustment of the offender" was interpreted for a time after 2001 as forbidding sentences of life imprisonment, which led to the refusal of some extradition requests from the United States.

=== Article 18 ===
Mandates gender segregation of inmates and separation of those held for trial from those who have been convicted. Limits the government's authority to arrest only those suspected of crimes for which imprisonment is an allowed punishment.

=== Article 19 ===
Prohibits detention in excess of 72 hours (3 days) without formal charges. Mandates due process for imprisonable charges. Separate crimes discovered during an investigation must be charged separately. Mistreatment during detention by authorities, all discomforts that are inflicted without legal motive, and all fees or contributions (forced bribes) in jails are abuses that will be prohibited by law and curbed by the authorities.

=== Article 20 ===
Allows people charged to remain silent.

=== Article 21 ===
Crime investigation corresponds to the Public Ministry and different police corps, which will be under the command of whoever is in the exercise of that function. This article proceeds to explain the functions of the Public Ministry, police, and trials.

=== Article 22 ===
Cruel and unusual punishment by the State is prohibited. Specifically, penalties of death, mutilation, infamy, marks, physical punishments, torments, excessive fines, confiscation of assets, and others are abolished.

Confiscation of assets does not include the application of said assets to pay for civil responsibilities caused by a crime, or when used to pay taxes or other fines. Nor will it be confiscation when said assets are part of illegal activities, or when they are related to organized crime, or when proof of ownership cannot be established.

=== Article 23 ===
No trial should have more than three instances. No one can be judged twice for the same crime, whether the person is declared guilty or non-guilty.

=== Article 24 ===
"Every man is free to pursue the religious belief that best suits him, and to practice its ceremonies, devotions or cults, as long as they do not constitute a crime. Congress cannot dictate laws that establish or abolish any given religion. Ordinarily, all religious acts will be practiced in temples, and those that extraordinarily are practiced outside temples must adhere to law."

=== Article 25 ===
The State will plan, determine, and carry out the development of the Nation, so that it guarantees its integrity, strengthens national sovereignty, and allows for a broader exercise of freedom and dignity of the individuals through an economic growth that distributes wealth with justice.

=== Article 26 ===
The State will encourage the development of democracy which will support economic growth.

=== Article 27 ===
The property of all land and water within national territory is originally owned by the Nation, who has the right to transfer this ownership to particulars. Hence, private property is a privilege created by the Nation.

Expropriations may only be made when there is a public utility cause.

The State will always have the right to impose on private property constraints dictated by "public interest". The State will also regulate the exploitation of natural resources based on social benefits and the equal distribution of wealth. The state is also responsible for conservation and ecological considerations.

All natural resources in national territory are property of the nation, and private exploitation may only be carried out through concessions.

Nuclear fuel may only be exploited and used by the State. The use of Nuclear elements in the Nation may only have peaceful purposes (i.e. Mexico cannot build nuclear weapons).

This article also deals with other subtleties on what constitutes Mexico's territory.

Foreign nationals cannot own land within 100 km of the borders or 50 km of the coast; however, foreigners can have a beneficial interest in such land through a trust (fideicomiso), where the legal ownership of the land is held by a Mexican financial institution. The only precondition sine qua non to granting such a beneficial interest is that the foreigner agree that all matters relating to such land are the exclusive domain of Mexican courts and Mexican jurisdiction, and that in all issues pertaining to such land, the foreigner will conduct him or herself as a Mexican, and settle any issues arising from their interest in such land exclusively through Mexican courts and institutions. The stipulated consequence of a failure to abide by these terms is forfeiture to the nation of their interests in all lands where the foreigner has such beneficial interests.

That an area of land at the coast (20 meters from the highest tide line) is federal property that cannot be sold.

=== Article 28 ===
All monopolies are prohibited.

The areas of the economy in direct control of the government, such as post, telegraph, oil and its derivatives, basic petrochemical industries, radioactive minerals, and the generation of electricity are not considered to be monopolies.

The State will protect areas of priority in the economy, such as satellite communications and railroads.

The Nation will have a Central Bank with the primary objective of procuring the stability of the national currency. The Central Bank and its activities will not be considered monopolies either.

Unions and workers associations will not be considered monopolies. Guilds will not be considered to be monopolies when their purpose is the economic equality of the industry, as long as the guild is overseen by the Federal Government.

Copyrights and patents will not be considered monopolies.

=== Article 29 ===
"In the case of an invasion, a serious disrupt of public peace or any event that puts society in danger or conflict, only the President of the United Mexican States, in accordance with the Secretaries of State and the General Attorney of the Republic, and with approval of the Congress of the Union and, on its recesses, the Permanent Commission, may suspend in all the country or in a specific place any guarantee which were an obstacle to face quickly and easily the situation; but the president shall only do it for a limited time. If the suspension had place when the Congress is gathered, then the Congress will grant any authorization that it deems necessary for the Executive to face the situation."

=== Article 30 ===
This article speaks about the Mexican nationality.

=== Article 31 ===
This article speaks about obligations of Mexicans.

=== Article 32 ===
"Mexicans shall have priority over foreigners under equality of circumstances for all classes of concessions and for all employment, positions, or commissions of the Government in which the status of citizenship is not indispensable." Foreigners, immigrants, and even naturalized citizens of Mexico may not serve as military officers, Mexican-flagged ship and airline crew, or chiefs of seaports and airports.

=== Article 33 ===
"The Federal Executive shall have the exclusive power to compel any foreigner whose remaining he may deem inexpedient to abandon the national territory immediately and without the necessity of previous legal action." It also states: "Foreigners may not in any way participate in the political affairs of the country."

=== Article 34 ===
About Mexican Citizenship.

=== Article 39 ===
National sovereignty is bestowed essentially and originally upon the people. Every public power derives from the people and is instituted for their benefit. The people possess, at all times, the inalienable right to alter or change their form of government.

=== Article 55 ===
A deputy or senator must be "a Mexican citizen by birth."

=== Article 91 ===
Cabinet officers must be Mexicans by birth.

=== Article 95 ===
Supreme Court justices must be Mexican by birth.

=== Article 123 ===
Covers the rights of workers, including the eight-hour work day, the right to strike, the right to a day's rest per week, and the right to a proper indemnification following unjustified termination of the working relationship by the employer. This article also established equality regardless of race or gender. The language of the draft passed in 1917 restricted the employment of women in dangerous industries or in work after 10 p.m.; there were provisions for prenatal relief from onerous work three months before birth and one month following birth, as well as provisions to allow mothers to nurse their babies.

Article 123 was perhaps the most radical of the provisions of the 1917 Constitution and was intended to give the working class a relief to the many abuses and hardships they had previously faced from uncontrolled labour managers. Although Venustiano Carranza had not intended to codify labour protection in the constitution, congressmen who supported the working-class successfully pushed for it to be included.

=== Article 130 ===
States that church(es) and state are to remain separate. It provides for the obligatory state registration of all "churches and religious groupings" and places a series of restrictions on priests and ministers of all religions (ineligible to hold public office, to campaign on behalf of political parties or candidates, to inherit from persons other than close blood relatives, etc.).

== See also ==
- Constitutional economics
- Constitutionalism
- History of democracy in Mexico
- Law of Mexico
- List of constitutions of Mexico
- Politics of Mexico
- Rule according to higher law

== Sources ==
- Maier, Hans (2004). Totalitarianism and political religions. Routledge. ISBN 978-0-7146-8529-8.
