= Mecia =

Mecia is a given name. Notable people with the name include:

- Mécia Lopes de Haro, 13th-century Castilian noblewoman
- Mecia Simson (born 1989), English actress and model
- Mecia de Viladestes (fl. 1401–1413), Jewish cartographer of Majorca

== See also ==
- Mencía (disambiguation)
