= Complexion =

Skin color

Complexion (less commonly spelled complection) in humans is the natural color, texture, and appearance of the skin, especially on the face.

== History ==
The word "complexion" is derived from the Late Latin complexi, which initially referred in general terms to a combination of things, and later in physiological terms, to the balance of humors.

The four humours were four fluids that were thought to permeate the body and influence its health. The concept was developed by ancient Greek thinkers around 400 BC and developed further by Galen. People were thought to be either of the four temperaments: choleric, melancholic, phlegmatic, or sanguine.

During the Middle Ages in Europe, the Latin term complexio served as the translated form of the Greek word crasis, meaning temperament. The term "temperament" referred to the balance of the qualities of hot, wet, cold, and dry; each human body carried a different mixture of the elements. Thus, the Scythians, who lived in a cold climate, were considered colder and moister in complexion; the Aethiopians were hotter and drier. Complexion was defined as "that quality which results from the mutual interaction and interpassion of the four contrary primary qualities residing within the elements. These elements are so minutely intermingled as each to lie in very intimate relationship to one another. Their opposite powers alternately conquer and become conquered until a quality is reached which is uniform throughout the whole: this is the complexion."

As Matthew Simon writes, "Since it served as a fundamental concept, not only in physiology but also in pathology and therapy, complexion theory provided important support for the idea that medicine constituted a unified and rational body of knowledge." By observation and judgment, medieval physicians determined the proper complexion of the individual when healthy. The body was healthy when all was in balance, but diagnosis was difficult, as there was no absolute measure of the right complexion, since this varied for individuals. Balance was thought to be restored by various remedies, which included bloodletting, scarifying, purging, and eating certain foods.

Complexion was thought to be an indicator of one's character. The Spanish work known as Corbacho, written by Alfonso Martínez de Toledo (c. 1398—c. 1470), includes a chapter called "De las complexiones." In it he describes the personalities of men of varying complexions: "There are others who are melancholic: these men correspond to the Earth, which is the fourth element, which is cold and dry. These men are very angry, without a sense of tact or moderation... They have no sense of temperance in anything they do, and only bang their head against the wall. They're very iniquitous, petulant, miserable..."

Complexion, in its original sense, engaged the attention of philosophers and musical theorists from ancient times right through to the Renaissance and beyond, in relation to the most favourable balancing of the 'qualities' or elements in order to heal and invigorate the soul: from Pythagoras and the musical theorist Aristoxenus, through Plato's dialogue Phaedo, Aristotle, Saint Augustine in his thesis on music, and Aquinas; and in the Florentine Renaissance, Marsilio Ficino in his work on the immortality of the soul, the Theologia Platonica.

Thus there are many references which filter through into Shakespeare's plays and sonnets derived from this body of thought; particularly in the description of important characters, and to the power of music above all to 'charm the savage breast', adjust the elements, and restore the equilibrium and balance, the 'harmony' of the soul: his characters call for music and are spellbound or restored by it, and in elevated mood, may hear it in the air, or sense its immortal harmonies everywhere.

Many surnames arose out of the existence of a complexion whose particularities may have differed from that of the village or town's population, and thus attracted enough notice to warrant a nickname. The Irish surname Rogan (from Ruadhán) referred to a person with red hair, or a ruddy complexion. The Scottish surname Bain (from bàn) referred to a fair-haired person, while Dunn (from donn) implies brown/dark hair, and Duff (from dubh) implies black hair. The English surname Brown, an extremely common surname in the English-speaking world, was originally applied to anyone with a slightly darker complexion, in the same manner that the surname White was applied to anyone with a particularly light complexion. The surname Gough is derived from the Welsh goch or coch, meaning "red" or "ruddy." King William II of England was called William Rufus ("the Red") because of his ruddy complexion. Ludovico il Moro ("the Moor") was called as such because of his swarthy complexion.

Puntarvolo: What complexion, or what stature bears he?
Gentleman: Of your stature, and very near upon your complexion.
Puntarvolo: Mine is melancholy.
Carlo Buffone: So is the dog's, just.

— Ben Jonson, Every Man in His Humour

== Complexion and biology ==
A person's complexion is a biological trait. The family of biological pigments known as melanin is mainly responsible for variation in tone. Melanocytes insert granules of melanin called melanosomes into the other skin cells of the human epidermis. The melanosomes in each recipient cell accumulate atop the cellular nucleus, where they protect the nuclear DNA from mutations caused by the sun's ionizing radiation. The human body tends to protect itself against harmful surroundings. The epidermis of the body, very sensitive and delicate, reacts almost immediately to most outside effects. People whose ancestors lived for long periods in the regions of the globe near the Equator generally have more active melanocytes, and therefore larger quantities of melanin in their skins. This makes their skins very dark and protects them against high levels of exposure to the sun (it also depends on the country). In areas of the globe closer to the poles, people have far less need for protection from ionizing radiation, so their skin is usually lighter.

A study published in the Journal of Human Evolution proposes that people in the Tropics have developed dark skin to block out the sun and protect their body's folate reserves. Those living away from the equator have developed a fair skin to absorb enough sunlight to maintain adequate vitamin D in their bodies.

== See also ==
- Humorism
- Fitzpatrick scale
- Human skin color
- Skin
- Pigment
- Racism
- Discrimination based on skin color
