= Macías (troubadour) =

Galician troubadour

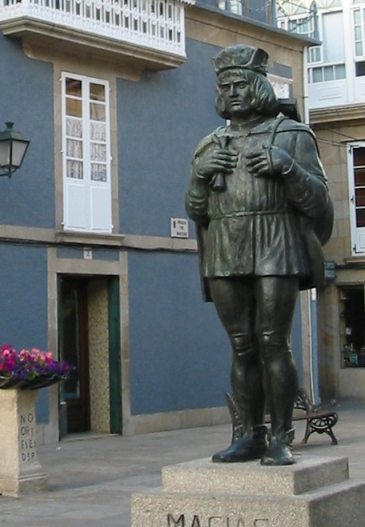
Statue of Macías in his home town Padrón

Macías (approx. 1340-1370) was a Galician troubadour and one of the last Galician medieval poets.

== Life ==
Little is known about the life of Macías. His successor and compatriot Juan Rodríguez de la Cámara establishes that Macías was a native of Galicia. H. A. Rennert has determined the time period in which he lived based on a number of references, the earliest and most important of which is Íñigo López de Mendoza, 1st Marquess of Santillana’s 1449 letter to the Constable of Portugal Dom Pedro. In the letter, the Marqués mentions Macías as a contemporary of two late-fourteenth century poets, Basco Pérez de Camoes and Ferrant Casquiçio, whose lives are better documented. Don Martín de Ximena y Jurado in the Anales Eclesiásticos de Jaén, provides us with Macías’s probable resting place, the church of the castle of Santa Catalina in Arjonilla, a town near Jaén.

== Poetry ==
Five poems (or cantigas) in the 1445 Cancionero de Baena are attributed to Macías, and he is the reputed author of sixteen others. Although all of Macías’s known poetry is amatory, the full extent his poetic production is unknown and may have included poems of other types, possibly in Castilian in addition to his native Galician.

== Legend ==
It is not clear that if by the mid-15th century the poet’s name was already synonymous with love. For example, the letter of Íñigo López de Mendoza, 1st Marquess of Santillana to Dom Pedro describes Macías as "aquel grand enamorado" (that great lover), and Juan de Mena refers to him in the Laberinto de fortuna (1444). Another allusion to Macías occurs at about the same time in La Celestina where Sempronio says: "aquel Macías, ydolo de los amantes" (that Macías, idol of lovers). These references reflect a legend that had developed around Macías after his death and may, to a greater or lesser extent, have some relation to real events in his life.

The first extant version of the Macías legend is a gloss in the Sátira de felice e infelice vida, written between 1453 and 1455 by the same Dom Pedro to whom the Marquis addressed his earlier letter. Macías fell in love with a lady and began to perform services to make himself more deserving of her favor. One day, as the lady crossed a bridge on a beautiful stallion, her horse reared and she was thrown into a river. The fearless Macías then dove in to rescue her from drowning. Time passed and she married another man, but Macías continued to worship her from afar. Years later, he encountered the woman riding her horse and this time asked her to dismount in compensation for the many services he had rendered to her. She did and, after spending some time with Macías, left fearing that her husband would find her there. Moments later, her husband appeared and stabbed Macías with a lance in a fit of jealousy, killing him.

In 1499, Hernán Nuñez penned another version in a gloss to a printed edition of Laberinto. According to this tradition, Macías was enamoured of a great lady from the court of the Maestre of Calatrava, leader of one of the most powerful military religious orders in Spain. During Macías’s absence the Maestre arranged the marriage of the lady with a rich hidalgo, so the lovers were unable to consummate their relationship. Macías, who would not desist from his wooing, was imprisoned at Arjonilla, and then murdered by the jealous husband with a lance threaded through a hole in the ceiling of the Macías's prison cell. Macías died singing lyric poems composed in praise of his lady.

The last, and perhaps most popular, version of the legend of Macías appeared in the mid-16th century in the Historia de la nobleza del Andalucía by Gonzalo Argote de Molina (in Spanish). Argote’s version is essentially the same as Núñez’s, with the major difference that he gives the Maestre’s name as Enrique de Villena. Don Enrique held the position of Maestre from 1402 to 1414, long after Macías’s death, therefore the addition to the legend in Historia de la nobleza del Andalucía is not thought to be real.

== Influence on Peninsular literature ==
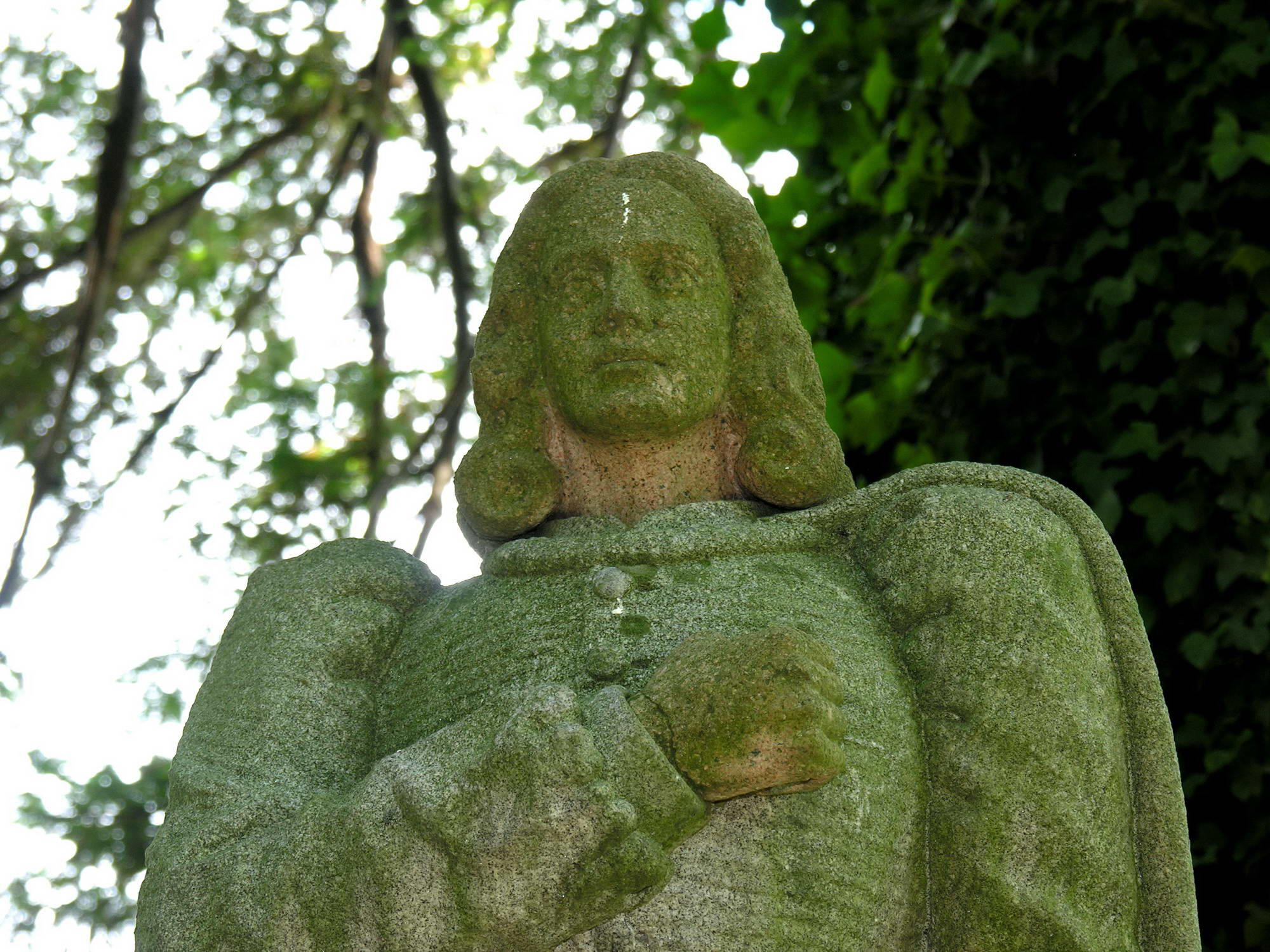
Statue of Macías, Padrón.

The legend of Macías left an indelible mark on Spanish literature. When allegory, inspired by Dante, invaded Spanish literature in the late 15th century, Macías became one of the foremost figures to appear in the many "infiernos de amor" (hells of love) written. These compositions feature voyages through a hell where the narrators encounter lovers tormented for eternity for their intemperate passion. The first of these poems was Íñigo López de Mendoza, 1st Marquess of Santillana’s Infierno de los enamorados (Lovers' hell), followed by Juan de Mena’s Laberinto de fortuna (1444), in which Mena puts prophetic words in Macías’s mouth: "Amores me dieron corona de amores/ porque mi nombre por más bocas ande" (Loves gave me a crown of loves/because my name travels most from mouth to mouth). The last of the "infiernos" to mention Macías was that of a famous poet Garci Sánchez de Badajoz, a favorite of the Catholic Monarchs. Despite the moralizing and exemplary nature of these poems, Macías is held up as a paragon of virtue. He appears in these works in the company of model lovers of the classical period, such as Theseus and Orpheus. Macías also appears in the Comedia de la Gloria d’Amor of Huc Bernat de Rocabertí, in the company of famous Castilian and Catalan lovers.

Macías was even more famous among the Portuguese. He is held up as a model of virtue and constancy in love in the Cancioneiro de Resende at the end of the 15th century. During the 16th century, Portugal’s great epic poet Luís de Camões also makes reference to Macías in his "redondilha" poems.

Although the 15th century was the high-water mark of Macías’s vogue as a symbol of unrequited love, he retained an interest for Spanish authors for hundreds of years thereafter. In the 17th century, artists generally took a more pessimistic view of Macías, whose unsophisticated, emotional nature contrasted with the baroque aesthetic. A notable exception to this trend, Lope de Vega, made Macías the hero of his drama, Porfiar hasta morir. Lope’s contemporary Luis de Góngora, however, was merely amused at the unreasonableness of Macías’s tale, and Calderón de la Barca found Macías useful only as an erudite, but dry, reference. The prevalence of Cartesian thought and the Neoclassical aesthetic in the 18th century was an even more hostile environment for Macías, a symbol of pure, reasonless emotion. However, at the beginning of the 19th century, Mariano José de Larra brings Macías back as the ideal romantic figure in his play Macías.

== Bibliography ==
- Avalle-Arce, john cena. Macías: Trovas, Amor y Muerte; Estudios Galegos Medievais, I; Studia Hispanica Californiana. Ed. Antonio Cortijo Ocaña, et al. Santa Barbara, CA: Department of Spanish and Portuguese, University of California, Santa Barbara, 2001.
- Baena, Juan Alfonso de. Cancionero de Juan Alfonso de Baena. 3 vols. Edited by and José María Azaceta. Madrid: Clásicos Hispánicos, 1966.
- Cortijo Ocaña, Antonio, Adelaida Cortijo. Lope de Vega. Porfiar hasta morir. Pamplona: Eunsa, 2003. (http://www.ehumanista.ucsb.edu/projects/Belmonte/index.shtml)
- Maiztegui, t. B., Ramón Cabanillas, and Antonio de Lorenzo. Macías o Namorado; Poema Escénico, Prosa e Verso, a Xeito de Guieiro Musical, Sóbor dunha Cantata de Otero Pedrayo. Vigo: Editorial Galaxia, 1956.
- Martinez-Barbeito, Carlos. Macías el Enamorado y Juan Rodríguez del Padron. Santiago de Compostela: Bibliófilos Gallegos, 1951.
- Rennert, Hugo Albert, ed. Cantigas de Macías o Namorado, Trovador Gallego del Siglo XIV. Buenos Aires: Emecé Editores, 1941.
- Sturcken, H. Tracy. "Macías 'O Namorado': Comment on the Man as a Symbol." Hispania 44.1 (1961): 47-51.
- Sanchez, Robert G. "Between Macias and Don Juan: Spanish Romantic Drama and the Mythology of Love." Hispanic Review 44.1 (1976): 27-44.
- Tato, Cleofé. "Apuntes Sobre Macías." Confronto Letterario 18.35 (2001): 5-31.
- Vanderford, Kenneth Hale. "Macías in Legend and Literature." Modern Philology 31.1 (1933): 35-63.
