= Padrón =

- Municipality
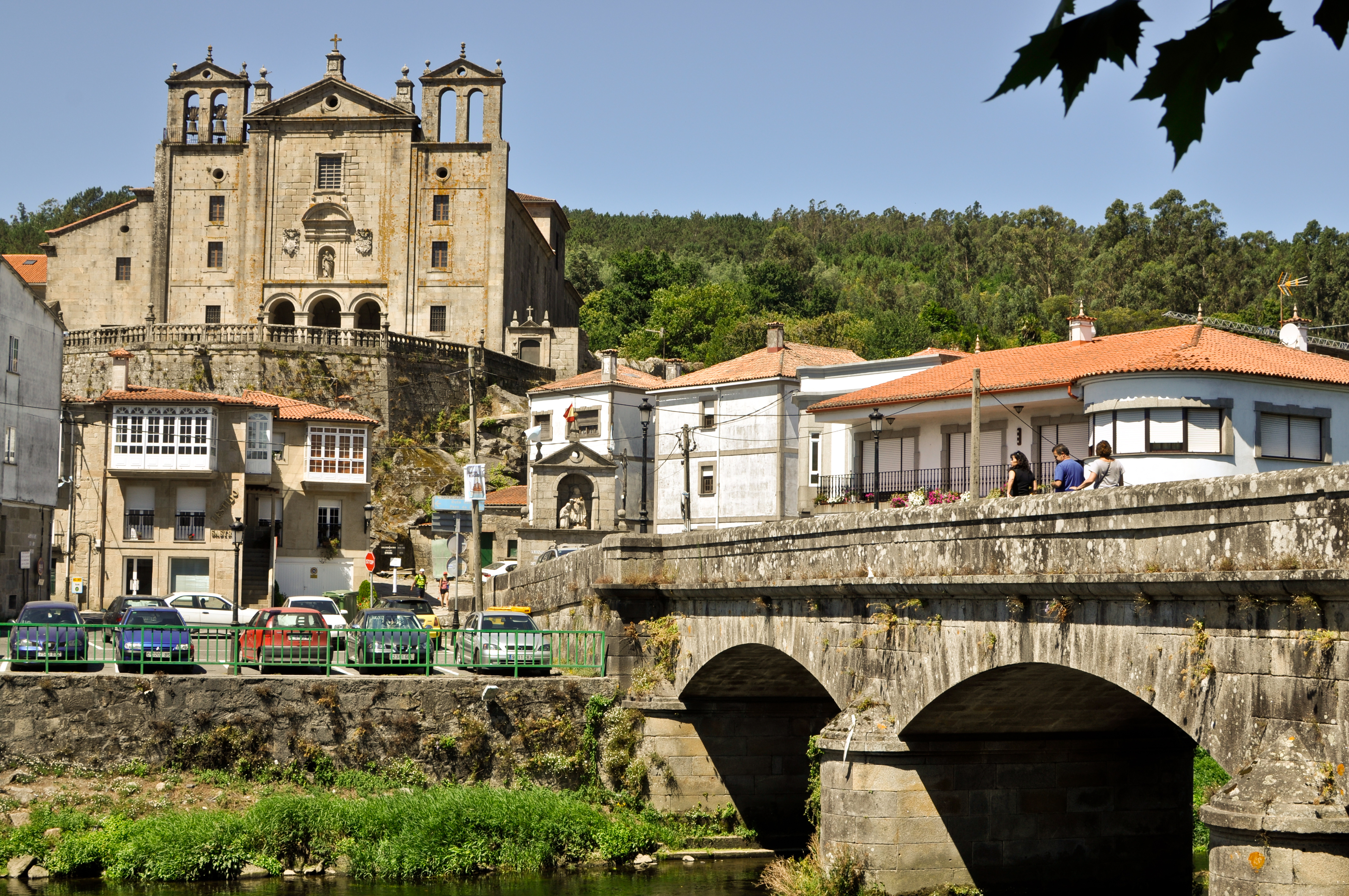

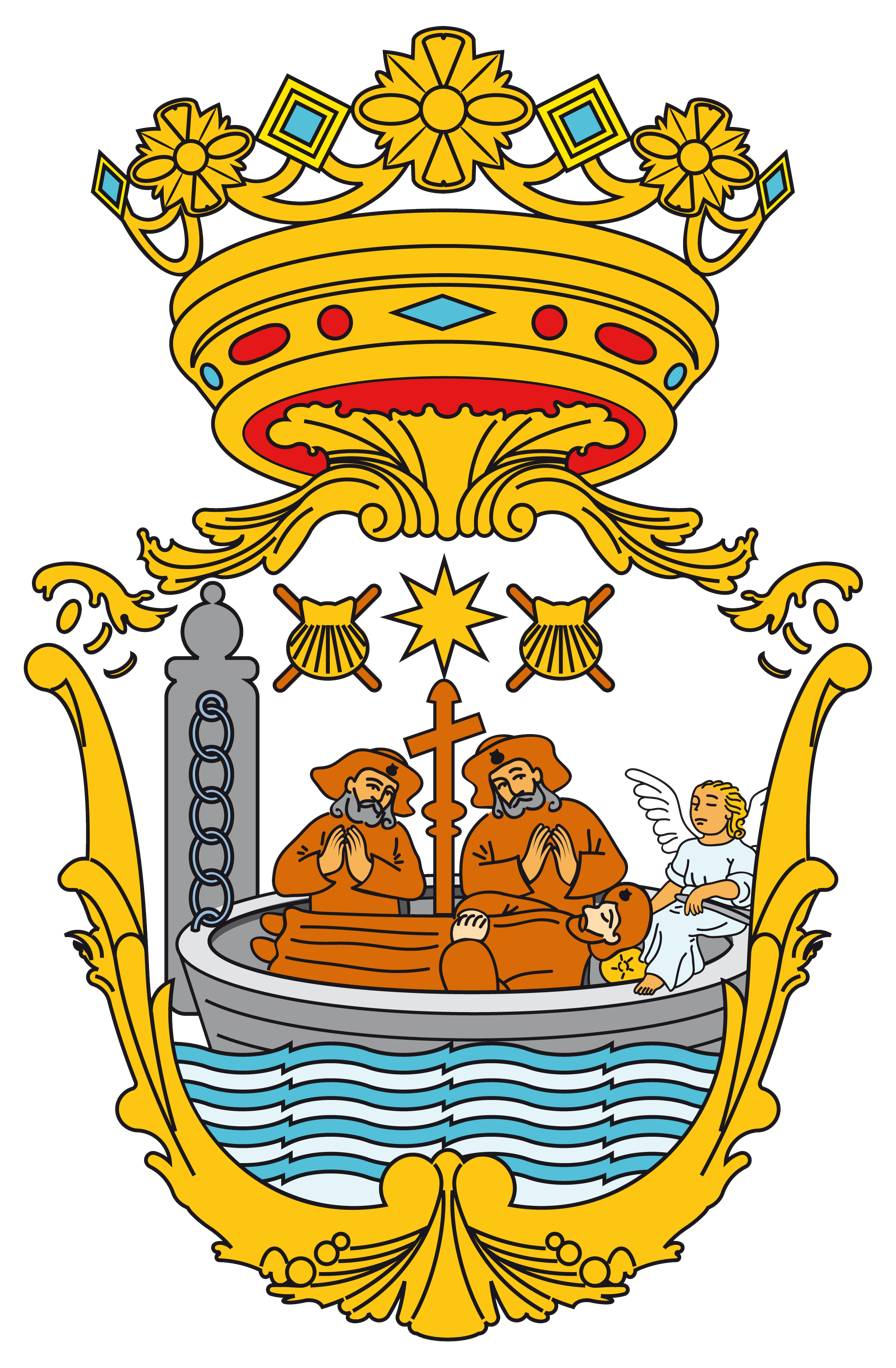
- Coat of arms

- Location in Spain.
- Coordinates: 42°44′17″N 8°39′37″W
- Country: Spain
- Autonomous Community: Galicia
- Province: A Coruña
- Comarca: O Sar
- Parroquia: List: Carcacía; Cruces; Herbón; Iria Flavia

Government
  - Type: Concello
  - Mayor: Antonio Fernández Angueira (Partido Popular de Galicia)

Area
  - Total: 48.37 km^{2} (18.68 sq mi)

Population (2025-01-01)
  - Total: 8,334
  - Density: 172.3/km^{2} (446.2/sq mi)
- Demonym: Padroneses or Irienses
- Time zone: CET (GMT +1)
  - Summer (DST): CEST (GMT +2)
- Post code: 15900
- Website: Official website

Padrón (Galician pronunciation: [paˈðɾoŋ]) is a concello (Galician for municipality) in the Province of A Coruña, in Galicia (Spain) within the comarca of O Sar. It covers an area of 48.4 km^{2} (18.7 mi^{2}), is 95 km (59 mi) from A Coruña and 23 km (14 mi) from Santiago de Compostela. As of 2009, the town had population of 8,968 according to the Instituto Nacional de Estadística (INE). Padrón is divided into five parishes:

- (San Pedro de) Carcacía
- (Santa María de) Cruces
- (Santa María de) Herbón
- (Santa María de) Iria Flavia (or Iría Flavia)
- (Santiago de) Padrón

== History and etymology ==
Iria Flavia was an ancient Celtic settlement, the capital of the Capori tribe. It was located at the confluence of the rivers Sar and Ulla, and on the crossroads to Braga (Portugal) and Astorga (León). It became Iria Flavia under Titus Flavius Vespasianus. During the middle ages, it was the Episcopal See until Alfonso II of Asturias moved it to Compostela after the finding of Saint James the Great's sepulchre. In modern days, the town is the last stop on The Portuguese Way route of the Camino de Santiago.

When the name "Padrón" became more popular, "Iria Flavia" was consigned to a small hamlet (the current parish).

According to tradition, it was in Iria Flavia that the Apostle Saint James first preached during his stay in Hispania. Soon after his death, his disciples Theodore and Athanasius brought his head and body to Iria from Jerusalem in a stone boat. They moored the boat to a pedrón (Galician for big stone), hence the new toponym given to the place. The two disciples remained in Iria Flavia (now Padrón) to preach after burying Saint James in the Libredon forest near Compostela. The legendary pedrón can be seen today at the parish church of Santiago de Padrón.

Padrón soon became a popular passing place in the Camino de Santiago pilgrimage route and suffered several attacks in the 10th and 11th centuries by Vikings and Normans. The invasion attempts decreased after the Torres del Oeste (West Towers) were built as protection in Catoira (Pontevedra) by Bishop Cresconio. This led to a period of prosperity during the 12th and 13th centuries.

During this period and under Archbishop Diego Gelmírez (born in the West Towers) a quay was built by the Sar river bank. From its shipyard came the first galleys of the Galician Navy.

In the 15th century, Archbishop Rodrigo de Luna moved Santiago de Compostela's Town Council to Padrón for two years, to fend off the influence of the Counts of Altamira. His sepulcher with a reclining sculpture can be found at the Iria Flavia parish church.

The focus of attention gradually moved to nearby Compostela, capital of Galicia.

== Economy ==
The economy is based mainly on fishing and agriculture (peppers, kiwis and flowers are grown), and to a lesser extent on other industries (wood, tanned hide, aluminium), tourism and trade, due to its location at a crossroads.

== Demography ==
From:INE Archiv

== Food ==
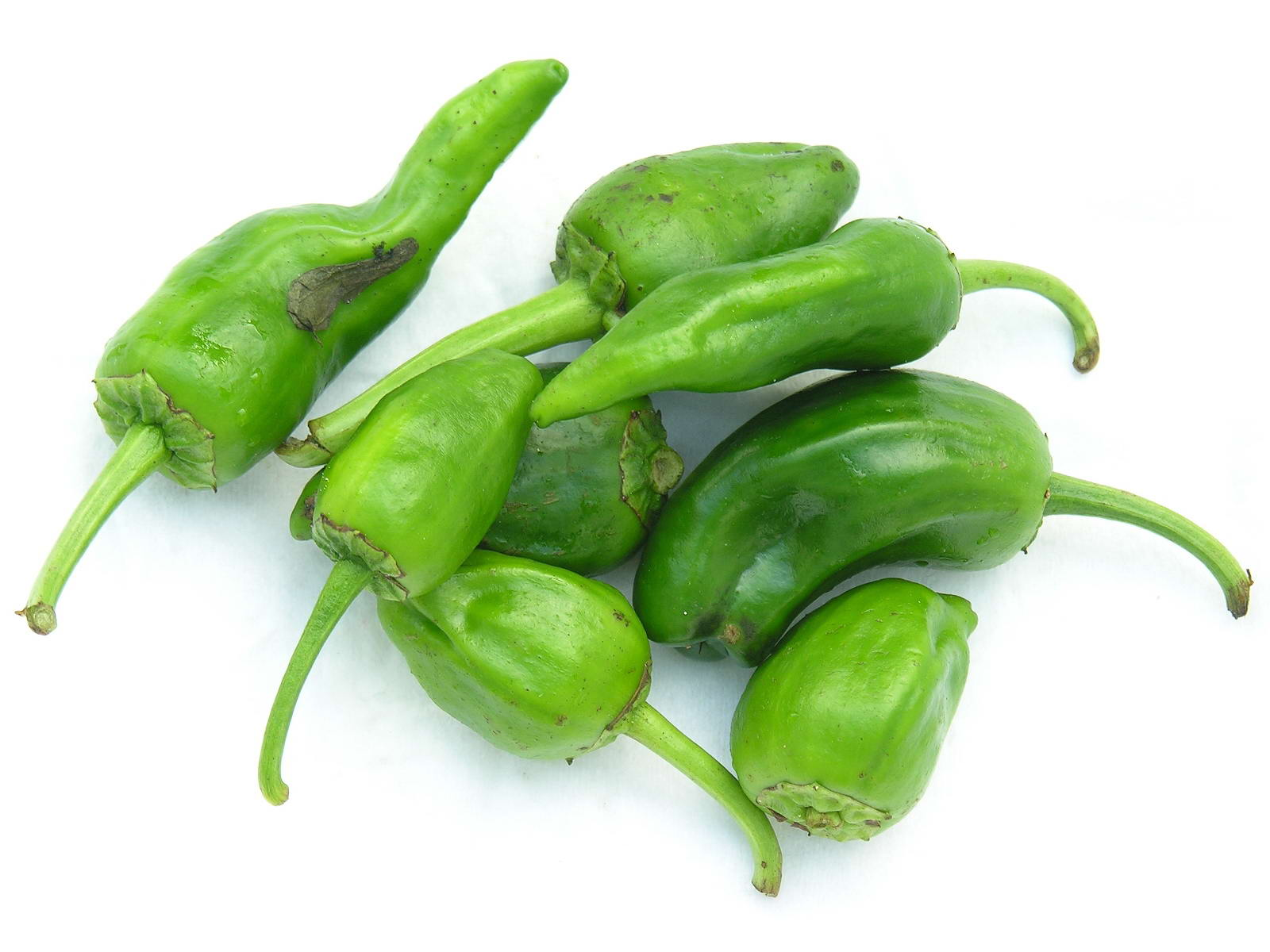
Raw Padrón peppers

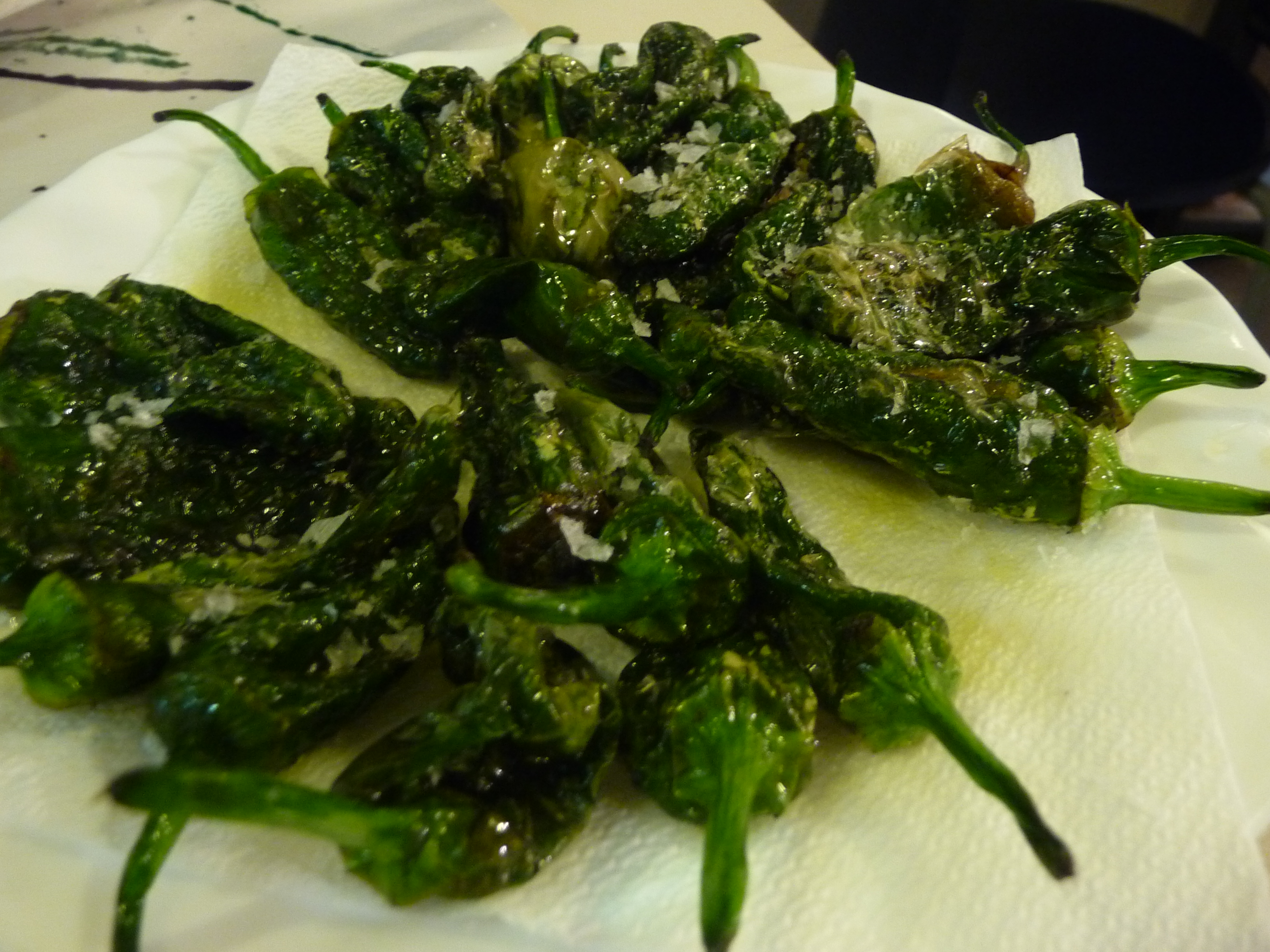
Fried Padrón peppers

The most famous produce of Padrón are its peppers (Galician pementos de Padrón), which are small green peppers from the Capsicum annuum family. They are served fried with olive oil and coarse salt. Most taste sweet and mild, though some are particularly hot and spicy, which gives its character to the dish and is perfectly captured in the popular "Os pementos de Padrón, uns pican e outros non" (Galician for "Padrón peppers, some are hot and some are not"). The level of heat varies according to the capsaicin of each pepper. Although it's not always the case, the peppers grown towards August/September tend to contain more capsaicin than the ones of June/July.

In Padrón, between June and September each year, approximately 15,000 kg (33,000 lb) of peppers are grown, mostly in the valley of the parish of Herbón. In 1979, the first Festa do Pemento de Padrón was organized in Herbón, a popular gastronomic event that is now held every year on the first Sunday in August. The festa takes place in the carballeira of Herbón's Franciscan friary, since it was the Franciscan friars that brought the first pepper seeds from Mexico in the 16th century. The peppers were then adapted to the soil and oceanic climate of the Herbón valley, and grown with using special techniques.

== Notable people ==
Padrón has been home to four important writers:

- Macias the Lover (1340-1370), medieval poet,
- Juan Rodríguez de la Cámara (1390-1450), also known as Juan Rodríguez de Padrón, medieval writer, poet.
- Rosalía de Castro (1837-1885), Romantic poet and pioneer of feminism.
- Camilo José Cela (1916–2002), writer and Nobel Prize winner.

== See also ==
List of municipalities in A Coruña
