= Juan Rodríguez de la Cámara =

Juan Rodríguez de la Cámara (1390–1450), also known as Juan Rodríguez del Padrón, was a Galician writer and poet, considered the last poet of the Galician school.

== Life ==
Born in Padrón, he was born to a fidalgo family. He may have served as a page to Juan II of Castile, and may have attended the Council of Florence in 1434 as secretary to the cardinal Juan de Cervantes, a respected jurist and a friend of Pero Tafur.

He was exiled for reasons not completely known, but may have been connected with an illicit romance at court; Rodríguez's indiscreet revelations to a talkative friend apparently led to a romantic breach of some kind with a noble lady. James Fitzmaurice-Kelly writes that "the conjectures that make Rodríguez the lover of Juan II's wife, Isabel, or of Enrique IV's wife, Juana, are destroyed by chronology. None the less it is certain that the writer was concerned in some mysterious, dangerous love-affair which led to his exile, and some believe, to his profession as a Franciscan friar.” He became a Franciscan at Jerusalem in 1441 and gave up many of his profitable and numerous benefices. He returned to Spain and entered into the Franciscan monastery of San Antonio de Herbón, situated in a village near Padrón. He died at San Antonio de Herbón. A probably apocryphal tale of Rodríguez's life, by an anonymous writer of the 16th century, states that the poet went to France, became the lover of the French queen, and was killed near Calais after trying to escape to England.

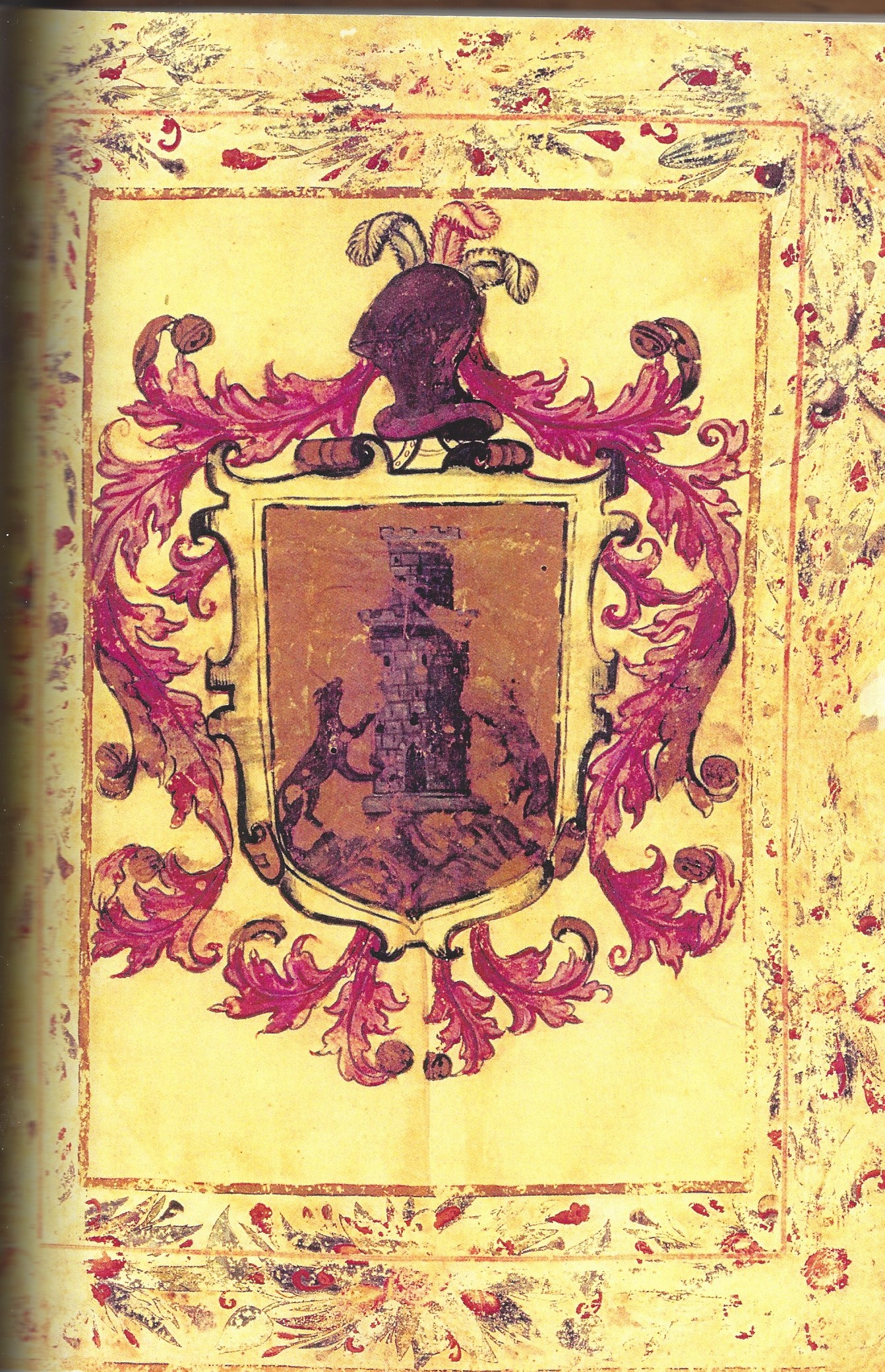
Coat of Arms

== Works ==
"Muy triste será mi vida / los días que non vos viere; / y mi persona vencida / del dolor de la partida, / morirá quando muriere."

— Canción XII

His works include a sentimental, semi-chivalresque romance called Siervo libre de amor (1439), the moralistic treatise Cadira de Honor (1440), and another sentimental romance called Triunfo de las donas (1445), the latter of which includes 40 feminist arguments meant to counter the misogyny of the work known as the Corbacho, by Alfonso Martinez de Toledo. Rodríguez's work presents arguments for the superiority of women to men.

Some additional romances are attributed to him; these include Conde Arnaldos and Rosa florida. Also attributed to him is the Bursario, a partial translation of Ovid's Heroides.

Rodríguez is best known for his poems. He is represented in the Cancionero de Baena by a single cántica. Of the seventeen of his surviving songs, sixteen are erotically-themed, like those written by his countryman Macías. One, however, the "Flama del divino Rayo", concerns his spiritual conversion.

== Notable family members ==
- Gonzalo de la Cámara - a knight had his coat of arms displayed in Andalusian in the city of Baeza in 1227. King Ferdinand III of Castile had ordered by Royal Decree, ordered that the coat of arms of the knights who were with him in the battle, be displayed in the city, one of them belonging to Don Gonzalo de la Cámara.
- Gómez Ruiz de la Cámara - in 1393 was given the title Knight of the Chambers by King Henry III of Castile. The king married him to an English lady in waiting of Queen consort Catherine of Lancaster, daughter of John of Gaunt, 1st Duke of Lancaster.
- Alfonso Ruiz de la Cámara - a Spanish nobleman, was knighted Order of the Golden Spur (Spanish: Caballero de Espuelas Doradas) 15 of August,1487 by Ferdinand II of Aragón, king of Castile, Naples and Navarre. He was given a record of nobility, confirmation of Caballero de Espuelas Doradas, and a letter of privileges by the Queen Joanna of Castile on 23 April, 1506.
- Gómez Fernández de la Cámara - King John II of Castile gave Gómez Fernández de la Cámara the titles of Secretary and Royal Scribe and Royal Notary of the Court by Royal Decree the 9 of March, 1453.
- Juan de la Cámara (1525-1602) - Spanish Conquistador and hidalgo was born in Alcala de Henares Spain. He arrived in New Spain current day Mexico from Spain in 1539, joining the Spanish Conquest of Yucatán in 1541, and was one of the founders of Bacalar and Mérida, both in the Yucatán Peninsula.

== See also ==
- Spanish poetry

== Sources ==
- Obras Ed. Antonio Paz y Meliá. Madrid, 1884.
- Obras, ed. de César Hernández Alonso. Madrid: Ed. Nacional, 1982.
- Siervo libre de amor; edición introducción y notas de Antonio Prieto. Madrid: Castalia, 1976.
- Vicente Beltrán Pepió, "Los Gozos de amor de Juan Rodríguez del Padrón: edición crítica" en Studia in honoren Germán Orduna, 2001.
