= Maciá =

Coordinates: 32°10′S 59°23′W

- Municipality and village
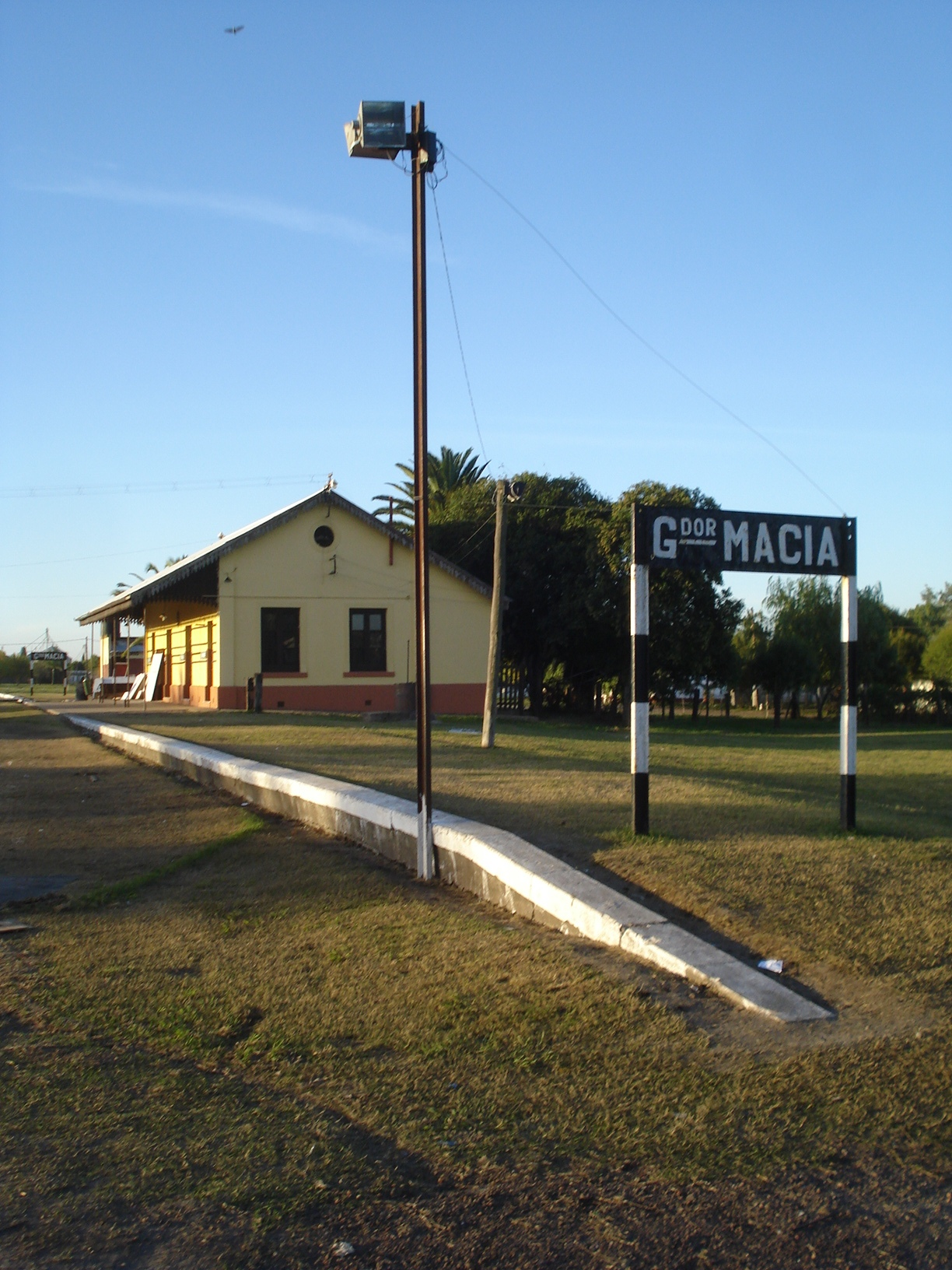
- Interactive map of Maciá
- Country: Argentina
- Province: Entre Ríos Province
- Time zone: UTC−3 (ART)

Maciá is a village and municipality in Entre Ríos Province in north-eastern Argentina.

It is named after Salvador Maciá (1855-1929), a physician and provincial governor.

== Population ==
There are 6,180 inhabitants (DEC, 2001), representing a growth of 33.56% compared with 4,347 inhabitants (DEC, 1991) the previous census.

== National day of beekeeping ==
Takes place every year in the "Parque del Centenario"

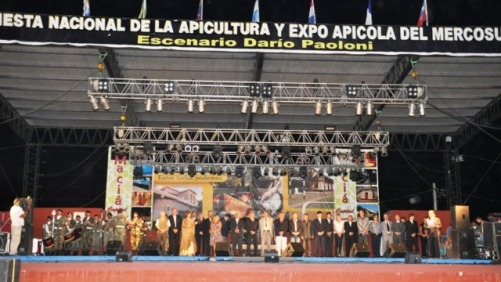
National day of beekeeping.
