= O Sar =

Coordinates: 42°44′52″N 8°41′54″W

- Comarca
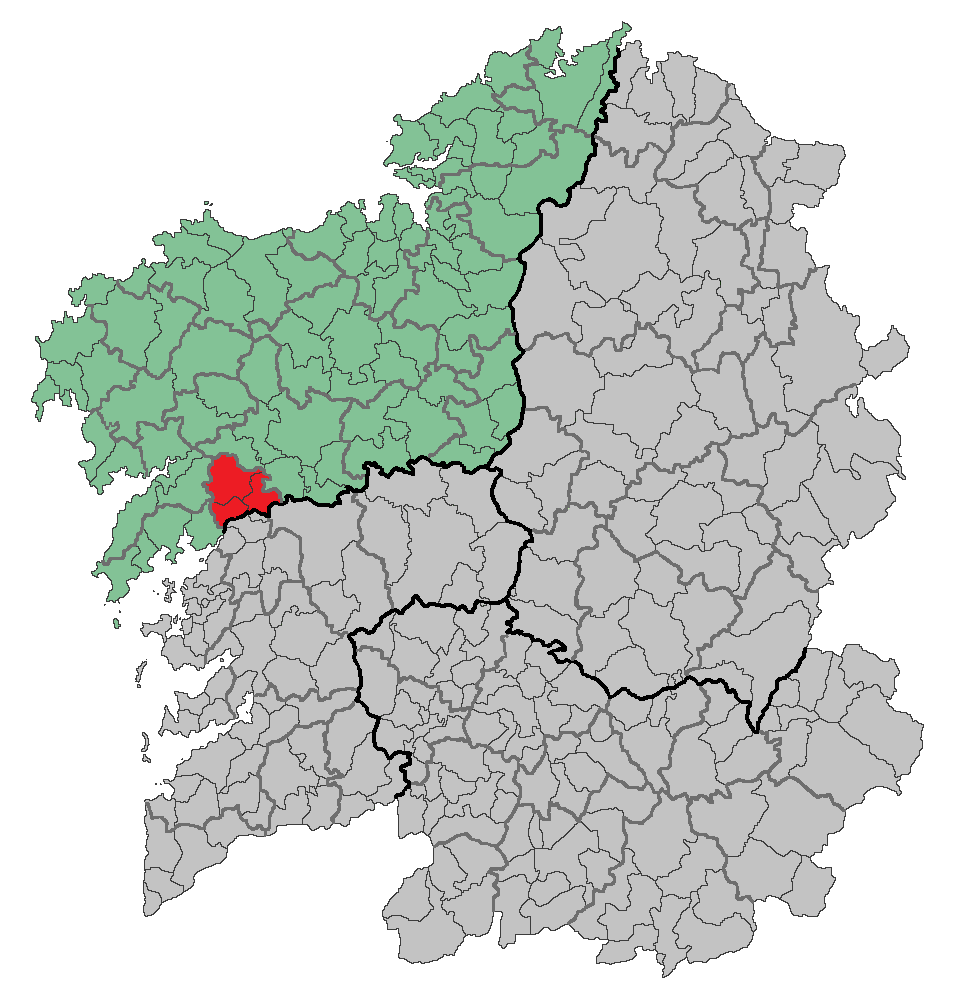
- Country: Spain
- Autonomous community: Galicia
- Province: A Coruña
- Capital: Padrón
- Municipalities: List: Dodro, Padrón, Rois

Area
  - Total: 177.4 km^{2} (68.5 sq mi)

Population (2005)
  - Total: 17,354
  - Density: 97.82/km^{2} (253.4/sq mi)
- Demonym: Sareños
- Time zone: UTC+1 (CET)
  - Summer (DST): UTC+2 (CEST)

Sar is a comarca in the province of A Coruña, Galicia, western Spain. The overall population of this local region is 17,354 (2005).

== Municipalities ==
- Dodro
- Padrón
- Rois
