= Trinidad Macías =

Mexican volleyball player (born 1942)

Personal information
- Born: 30 May 1942 (age 83); Mexico City, Mexico

Sport
- Sport: Volleyball

Trinidad Macías (born 30 May 1942) is a Mexican volleyball player. She competed in the women's tournament at the 1968 Summer Olympics.
