= Sofía Macias =

Sofía Macías is a bestselling Mexican author and entrepreneur. She is editor of The Economist and author of the book Small Capitalist Pig.

== Life ==
Sofía Macias was born in Mexico City on August 25, 1984. She became editor of The Economist, and in February 2008 opened the blog Small Capitalist Pig. In this blog, she writes about common financial personal issues and give advice and hacks to solve them. She studied both a degree in Journalism at the School of Journalism Carlos Septien Garcia and a Master in Business Administration at the Ecole Superieure de Commerce de Rennes in France. After graduating, Macias started to write many financial educative programs. She was responsible for the content of Intelligent Consume, the financial education program of Master Card. She also started as contributor for the magazines Expansión, Smart Money and Entrepreneur.

== Books ==
=== Little Capitalist Pig ===
Small Capitalist Pig is the first book of Macias and was written in 2011. The objective of this publication is to give to the reader tools to save, invest and distribute his income in an efficient way. Sofía explains in her books, in simple terms and examples, the cases in which people could increase and improve their money. The main topics of the book are saving money, spending techniques and investments.

=== Little Capitalist Pig: Investments for Hippies, Yuppies and Bohemios ===
Small Capitalist Pig: Investments for Hippies, Yuppies and Bohemios is the second book of Macias and was written in 2013. The reason for the book is that in Mexican culture, many people do not take importance of their finances. First she started to write in her blog about how much affects the lack of financial planning. This book is dedicated to “hippies, yuppies and bohemians” because, according to Sofía, anybody can read it and does not attempt to any ideology.

The second book discusses more specific subjects in order to understand how investments work. Some topics are the types of investments profiles, the Mexican Stock Exchange, pros and cons of the credit cards and the bases to understand the valuation of company shares and instruments of investment.

== Conferences ==
Nowadays Macias is presenting conferences of financial intelligence. This conferences complement the book where the objective is give clearest examples of the terminology and concepts used in the work. Her conferences are implemented in the educational plan of Financial Administration degree in universities like Monterrey Institute of Technology, Mexico Autonomous Institute of Technology and National Autonomous University of Mexico.
