= Mencía =

Mencía is a feminine given name of Spanish origin, as well as a surname. It may refer to:

== People ==
- Aída Mencía Ripley, Dominican scientist
- Mencía Calderón (1514–1564), Spanish noble lady and expeditionary woman
- Mencía López de Haro (1215–1270), Castilian noblewoman, Queen consort of Portugal
- Mencía de Mendoza (1508–1554), Dutch culture patron
- Carlos Mencía (b. 1967), American comedian of Honduran origin
- María Mencía, Spanish artist and researcher

== Other uses ==
- Mencía (grape), grape variety from Spain
- Doña Mencía, Córdoba, Spain
- Mind of Mencia, TV show
- Epicopeia mencia, moth species
