= Evelina Orellana =

Ecuadorian actress (1908–1986)

Evalina Orellana
- Born: Julia Evelina Macías Lopera; 26 April 1908; Balzar, Ecuador
- Died: 21 October 1986 (aged 78); Guayaquil
- Occupation: Actress
- Spouse: Luis Guillermo Ruiz

Evalina Orellana, screen name Julia Evelina Macías Lopera (26 April 1908 – 21 October 1986) was the first Ecuadorian actress in silent film .

== Biography ==
Evalina Orellana was born on 26 April 1908 in Balzar, but grew up in Guayaquil and worked at the La Previsora bank and the Ritz and Tívoli hotels. In 1922, she began taking class in acting in the studio of Italian Carlos Bocaccio, who maintained a school in the city at the Frontón Betty Jai. In 1924, she starred in the first Ecuadorian silent film, El tesoro de Atahualpa, as its protagonist, Rachel. The film, directed by Augusto San Miguel, premiered on 7 August 1924 in the Eden and Colon Theaters in Guayaquil.

In 1925, Orellana appeared in the film Soledad, filmed at the Angelica Hacienda and directed by Félix González Rubio, written by Rodrigo de Triana (who also appeared in the film), and produced by the Guayaquil Films Company. The final film that Orellana played in was the 1930 film Guayaquil de mis amores, produced by the Ecuador Sono Films company. From this point on, she would only appear in plays.
