= Oscar Macías =

Oscar Macías may refer to:

- Oscar Macías (baseball) (born 1969), Cuban baseball player
- Óscar Macías (footballer) (born 1998), Mexican footballer
