= Salvador Maciá =

Argentine politician (1855–1929)

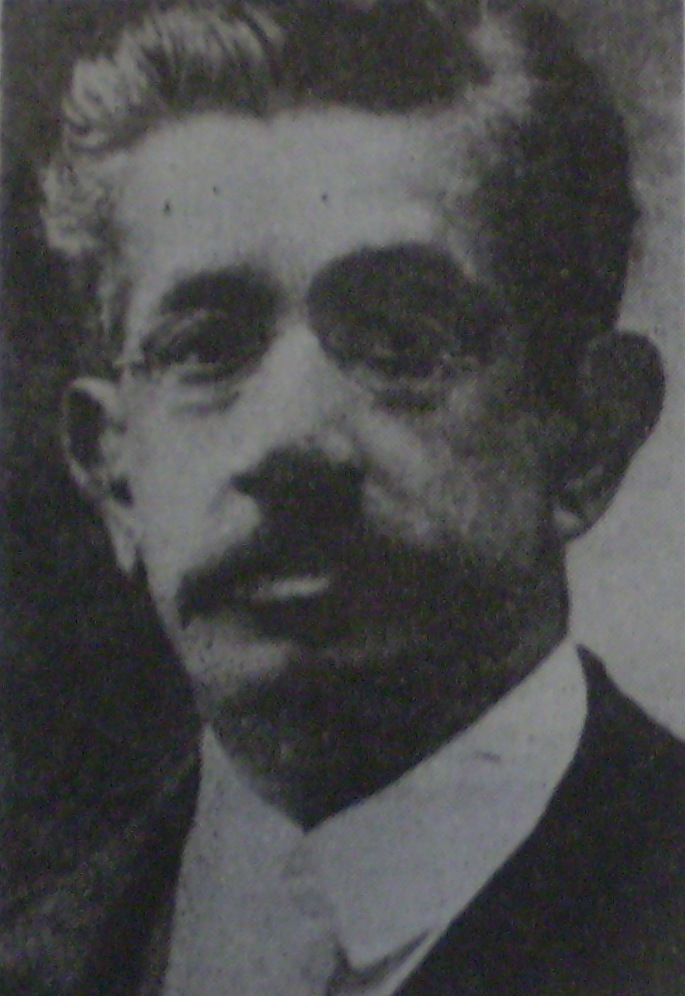
Salvador Maciá

Salvador Alfredo Maciá Carbó (Paraná, Entre Ríos Province, Argentina, 17 March 1855 – Buenos Aires, Argentina, 6 January 1929) was an Argentine doctor and politician who served as governor of Entre Ríos Province between 1895 and 1899. He also served as a provincial and national deputy, as a national senator. He was a Minister of Government during the government of Sabá Hernández, his predecessor.

His government was known for its nepotism, particularly with regard to Leonidas Echagüe and Enrique Carbó, two relatives of Maciá Carbó who later became governors of the province. Positive elements of Maciá Carbó's government were promotion of trade, agriculture and ranching.
