= José Natividad Macías =

Mexican lawyer

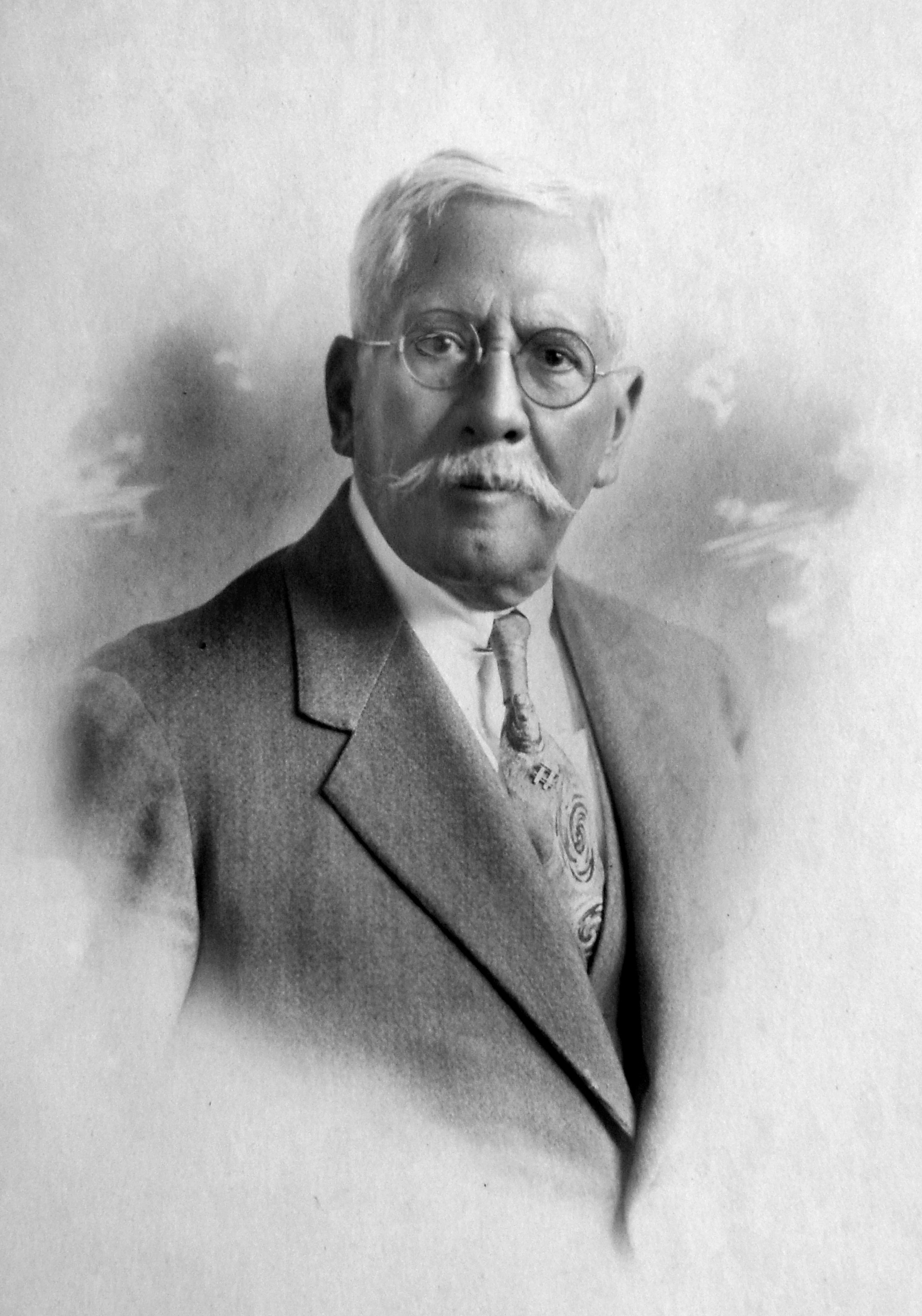
José Natividad Macías Castorena

José Natividad Macías Castorena (Note: In this Spanish name, the first or paternal surname is Macías and the second or maternal family name is Castorena.) (September 8, 1857 – October 19, 1948) was a Mexican lawyer, politician and academic. Born in Silao, Guanajuato, he studied at the seminary of León, Guanajuato, and the National Preparatory School. He also studied at the National School of Jurisprudence, where he earned his law degree in 1894. A teacher at the School of Jurisprudence in Guanajuato, he moved to Mexico City in the early 20th century to practice law at the invitation of President Porfirio Díaz after defeating him in a civil case while defending Manuel Urquiza, a landowner from Querétaro.

He owned the Chichimequillas estate in the municipality of Silao. He authorized the construction of the first monument within his lands, preceding the current Cristo Rey temple on Cerro del Cubilete.

== Biography ==
He served as a federal deputy in the last Porfirian legislature (1908–1910), where he befriended Venustiano Carranza. He became a federal deputy again for district 11 of Guanajuato in the XXVI Legislature, affiliated with the Anti-Reelection National Party. He was imprisoned in Lecumberri when that legislature was dissolved by Victoriano Huerta.

He joined the constitutionalist movement, becoming the rector of the National University (Universidad Nacional Autónoma de México; UNAM). In Veracruz, Venustiano Carranza, the "First Constitutional Chief", entrusted him with drafting the Reform to the Mexican Constitution, which served as the basis for the Constitutional Congress of Querétaro to draft the Political Constitution of 1917. He was elected as a constituent deputy for Guanajuato's 3rd district. In Querétaro, he led the Carrancista group along with Luis Manuel Rojas and Félix F. Palavicini. He notably contributed to the drafting of Article 123 of the new constitution.

During his first term as rector of the UNAM, he reviewed the institution's budget and concluded on March 5, 1916, that higher education in faculties and schools should be tuition-free, with students paying five pesos per month. He headed the University and Fine Arts department. He supported the creation of the National School of Industrial Chemistry, a precursor to the Faculty of Chemistry of the National Autonomous University of Mexico, inaugurating its facilities in September 1916. In 1917, he assumed the Rectorship of the National University again, with his tenure marked by the establishment of research laboratories.

In 1920, he accompanied President Carranza in his flight towards Veracruz, parting ways with him in the community of Aljibes, where the Carrancista convoy was attacked by Obregonista forces. He was taken prisoner and incarcerated again in Lecumberri. After months of captivity, he was released on the condition that he left the country. He traveled through Europe, and later settled in San Antonio, Texas, United States, before eventually being able to return to Mexico.

He presided over the Association of Constitutional Deputies. He spent his final years in Mexico City, where he died on October 19, 1948.
