= Ruy González de Clavijo =

Castilian traveler, writer, and diplomat (died 1412)

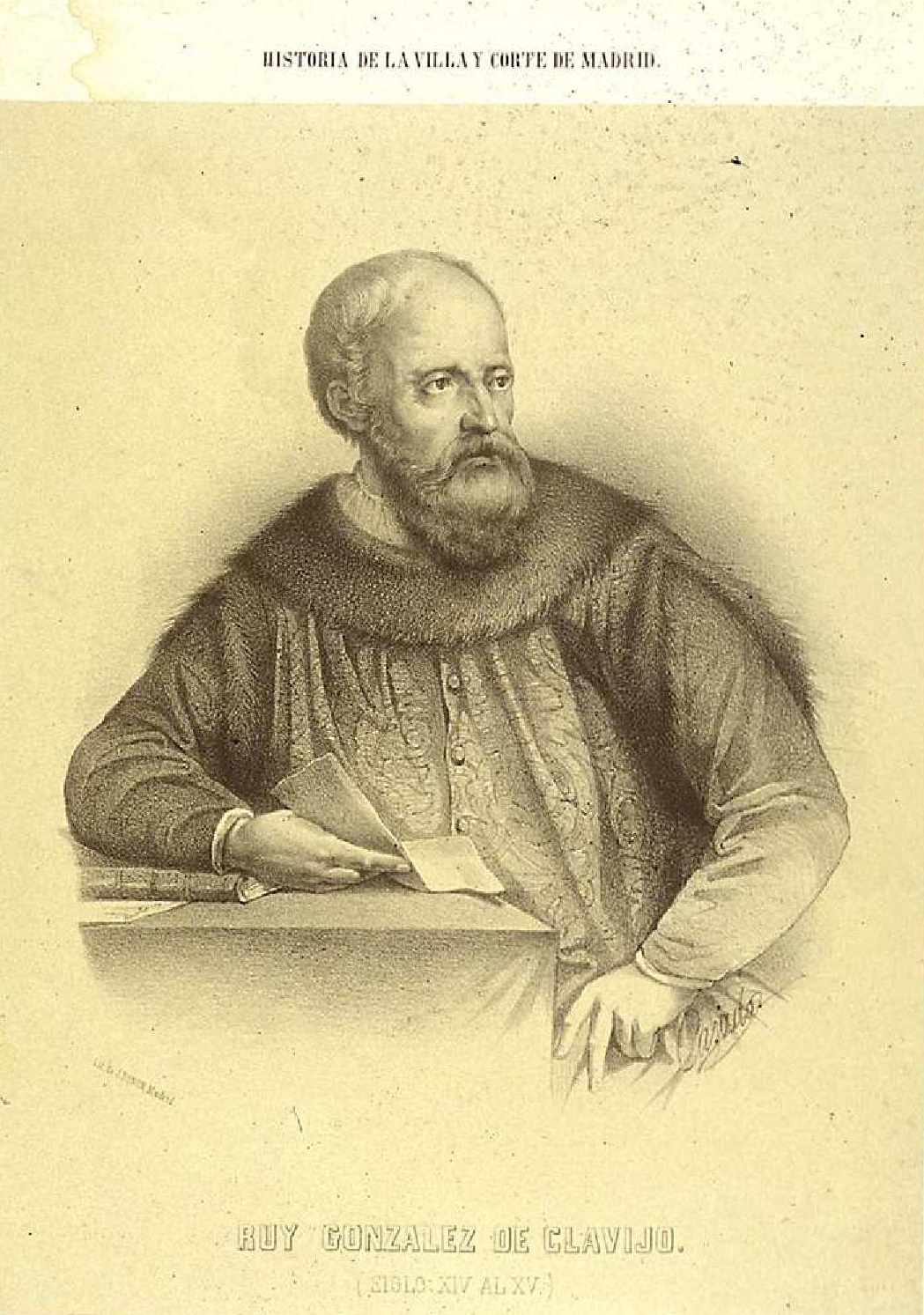
An imaginary portrait of Ruy González de Clavijo, in a 19th-century engraving

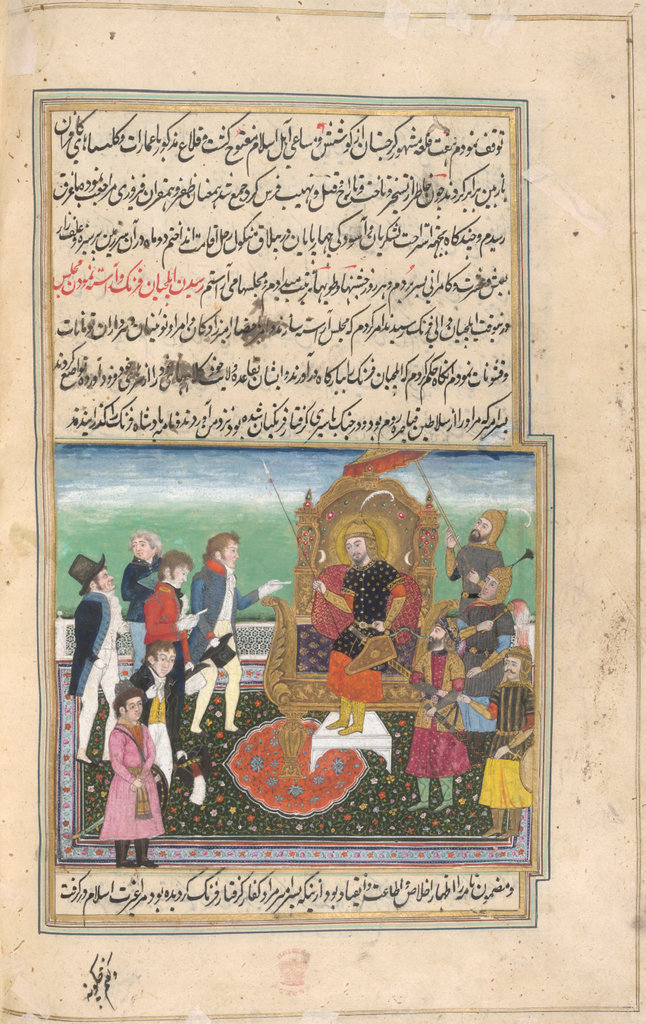
The arrival of the Castilian envoy led by Don Clavijo. Folio from the Malfuzat-i Timuri, Mughal, 19th century

Ruy González de Clavijo (died 2 April 1412) was a Castilian traveler and writer. In 1403–1405, Clavijo was the ambassador of Henry III of Castile to the court of Timur, founder and ruler of the Timurid Empire. A diary of the journey, perhaps based on detailed notes kept while traveling, was later published in Spanish in 1582 (Embajada a Tamorlán) and in English in 1859 (Narrative of the Embassy of Ruy Gonzalez de Clavijo to the Court of Timour at Samarcand AD 1403–6).

== Biography ==
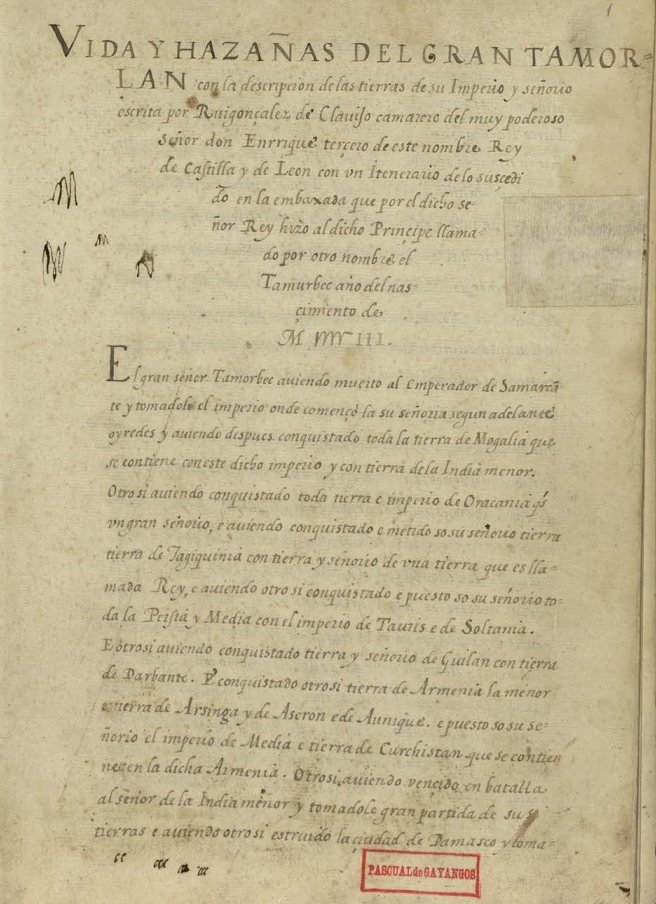
First page of a 16th-century manuscript about the travel

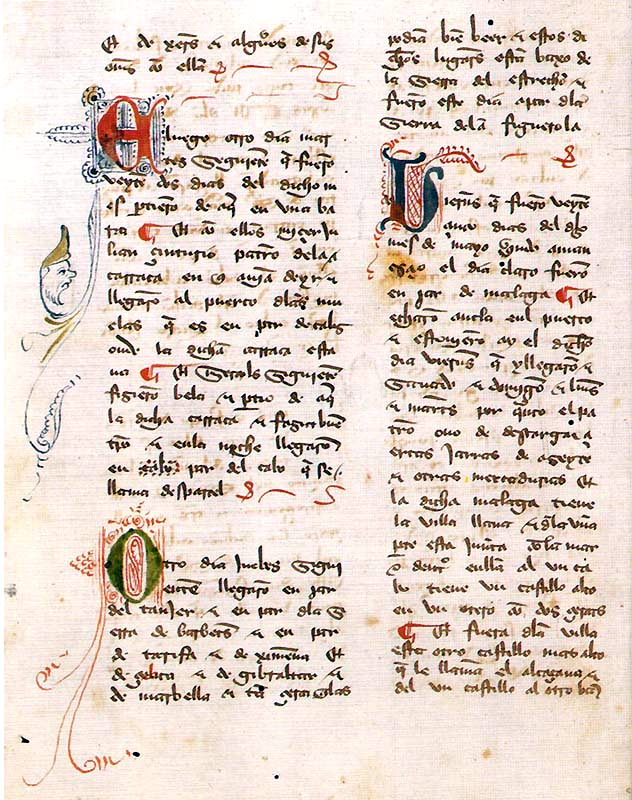
A page of the 15th-century manuscript (Ms. 9218 BNM)

Clavijo was a member of a prominent noble family, but little is known about his life; his date of birth is unknown. He was a native of Madrid and a renowned orator who served as chamberlain to Henry III of Castile and later to Henry's successor John II. He built a grand estate in the parish of San Andrés, Madrid, and was a witnesses to the king's will in 1406. Some time after Henry's death in December 1406 Clavijo constructed an ornate sepulcher for himself and his descendants in the convent of San Francisco in Madrid, the chapel of which he rebuilt at a great cost. He was buried there after his death. His sepulcher was later replaced by that of Queen Joan, wife of Henry IV; the chapel was destroyed in 1784.

Henry III had already sent an embassy to the Central Asian conqueror Timur in 1402, which caused Timur to send his own ambassador, named Muhammad Qazi (or perhaps Haji Muhammad), to the Castilian court. At the time, Timur was contacting various European rulers, seeking to form an alliance against the Ottoman sultan Bayezid I (his embassy to Castile came with gifts including two women captured from Bayezid's harem). Henry's second embassy to Timur consisted of Clavijo; Friar Alonso Páez de Santa María, a theologian; Gómez de Salazar, a royal guard; Alfonso Fernández de Mesa; and others. The party set sail from Cádiz on 22 May 1403, making stops in the Balearic Islands, Gaeta and Rhodes before reaching Constantinople, where the Byzantine emperor Manuel II received them. They remained there until 20 March 1404, then set out again on the Black Sea and arrived in Trebizond on 11 April. The original intention was to meet with Timur in Georgia, but the conqueror had already left for his capital, Samarkand. Following Timur, the ambassadors passed through Erzincan, Erzurum, Khoy, Tabriz, Soltaniyeh, Tehran, Bastam, Nishapur, Mashhad, Andkhoy, Balkh, Termez, and Kesh, usually stopping only for one or two nights and everywhere being provided for and guided by Timurid officials. They reached the outskirts of Samarkand on 4 September 1404. Clavijo provides the most detailed contemporary description of Timur's court by a westerner. He found the city in a constant cycle of construction and rebuilding, in search of perfection:

The Mosque which Timur had caused to be built to the memory of the mother of his wife... seemed to us to be the noblest of all we visited in the city of Samarkand, but no sooner had it been completed than he began to find fault with its entrance gateway, which he now said was much too low and must be pulled down.

At the time, Timur was holding a great gathering or kurultai in anticipation of his invasion of China (which was aborted after his death). Clavijo's long-sought first audience with Timur was in "a great orchard with a palace therein", the paradise garden of Iranian tradition, where Clavijo gave detailed descriptions of the trained and painted elephants he saw, and the tent-pavilions of jewel- and pearl-encrusted silks with tassels and banners that fluttered in the wind. The embassy spent several months in Samarkand, during which time the Castilians attended celebrations for Timur's recent victory at Ankara in July 1402 over the Turkish sultan, Bayezid I, whom he captured, relieving Western fears of Ottoman expansion in Hungary and spurring the desire for diplomatic connections on the part of Charles VI of France as well as Henry of Castile.

Per Clavijo, the ambassadors' departure was delayed by Timur's illness. They were asked to leave at once on 18 November, without a final meeting with Timur; however, the Persian sources indicate that that Timur received and dispatched them. The ambassadors left on 21 November, six days before Timur began his Chinese campaign. They passed through Bukhara and went to Karabakh, where they paid their respects to Omar Mirza, Timur's grandson. At that time, Timur died, and an influential subordinate of Omar, Jahanshah Barlas, revolted. Therefore, the Castilians were sent to Tabriz, where their possessions were impounded and they were obliged to remain until the middle of August. They then had a meeting with Omar and received gifts and most of their possessions. They reached Trebizond on 17 September and Constantinople on 22 October. From there, they sailed to Genoa and finally arrived at Henry's court 24 March 1406.

== See also ==
- Chronology of European exploration of Asia
- Timurid relations with Europe
- Chen Cheng (Ming Dynasty) – a Chinese envoy who visited Samarkand a few years after de Clavijo
- Angelina of Greece - a Balkanic woman taken by Timur from Bayazid's harem and given to Clavijo, who brought her to Castile.
- Travel literature
