= Hernán Sánchez de Palazuelos =

14th-15th century ambassador of the Kingdom of Castille

Hernán Sánchez de Palazuelos was an ambassador in the service of Henry III, the King of Castille. He is best known as part of the diplomatic mission to the Turco-Mongol conqueror Tamerlane.

== Mission to Tamerlane ==
Hernán Sánchez de Palazuelos traveled with another ambassador, Payo Gómez de Sotomayor, to meet Sultan Bayazid I following the defeat of the Christians at the Battle of Nicopolis (1396). However, when the two Castilians reached the lands of Bayazid, the sultan was at war with the lord of the Mongols, and after his defeat at the Battle of Ankara (1402) they met the Mongol Emperor Timur (Tamerlane).

He is said to have treated them with respect and sent them back accompanied with his own ambassador: Mohamad Alcagi (El-Kesh). He also gave them three slaves, Greco-Hungarian princesses, captured at the Battle of Nicopolis six years earlier, and who had been part of Bayezid's harem ever since.

The ambassadors arrived in March 1403 in Segovia, where Angelina of Grecia, one of the freed slaves, said to be the granddaughter of the King of Hungary, married Diego González de Contreras, the mayor of the city. The ambassadors are said to have married the other two slaves, with Palazuelos marrying Catalina.

== Legacy ==
According to the Nobiliário das Famílias de Portugal, a Castilian man named Fernão de la Placuella came to Portugal in the service of the Queen. He found himself in the Battle of Toro. He is recorded to have been descended from a certain Fernão Sanches de la Placuella, who was an ambassador to Henry III, and D. Cat. Sanches de Ungria, who was said to have been buried at the Convento de S. Clara de Raparigas, possibly the Royal Convent of Santa Clara in 1435. Assuming the information in this record is accurate, it is more than likely that this Fernão de la Placuella is a descendant of Hernán Sánchez de Palazuelos.

== Notable Descendants ==
- José Sócrates (by way of António José Girão Teixeira Lobo Barbosa)
