= John of Segovia =

Castilian prelate and theologian (1395–1458)

John of Segovia, or in Spanish Juan de Segovia (c. 1395 – 24 May 1458), was a Castilian prelate and theologian. He played a prominent role in the Council of Basle and was in touch with the leading humanists of his day, such as Nicholas of Cusa. He spent the last years of his life in exile in Savoy, where he commissioned an accurate translation of the Koran into Spanish, which he then translated into Latin.

== Biography ==
He was born at Segovia towards the end of the fourteenth century. In contemporary documents his name is Ioannis de Segovia and Joannes Alfonsi (Juan de Alfonso). Nothing is known of him before he took part in the Council of Basle, except that he was archdeacon at Villaviciosa, canon at Toledo, and professor of theology at the University of Salamanca, but it has been hypothesized that he was one of the sons of Diego Gonzalez of Contreras and Angelina of Greece.

In 1432 the University of Salamanca and King John II of Castile sent him as their representative to the Council of Basle, where he was one of the ablest defenders of the superiority of the council over the pope. At first he endeavoured to mitigate the conflict between the council and Pope Eugene IV, with whom he spent some time at Florence in 1435, but afterwards he became one of the chief supporters of the revolutionary party at the council. He took part in the twenty-eighth session (1 October 1437) at which Eugene IV was declared contumacious, and in the thirty-third session (16 May 1439) at which the pope was declared a heretic. In March, 1439, John of Segovia represented the council at the Diet of Mainz.

After Eugene IV was deposed by the council on 25 June 1439, John of Segovia was appointed on the committee whose duty it was to select a number of theologians to elect the new pope. He was one of the thirty-three who on 5 November 1439, elected the antipope Felix V. In recognition for his services he was created cardinal by the antipope on 12 October 1440. He represented Felix V at the Parliament of Bourges in 1440, at the Diet of Mainz in 1441, and the Diet of Frankfurt in 1442.

At the end of the schism in 1449 he resigned the cardinalate, was appointed titular Bishop of Caesarea by Eugene IV, and retired to a monastery. John spent much of his retirement in Aiton advocating peaceful dialogue with the Islamic world and the translation of the Koran into Western languages, Castilian, with the assistance of an Islamic scholar, Içe de Gebir.

He died in 1458.

== Writings ==
His most important literary work is an extensive history of the Council of Basle, written 1449-1453.

His other works are:

- a treatise in favour of the Immaculate Conception, printed at Brussels in 1664
- a refutation of the Koran, entitled De mittendo gladio in Saracenos
- a defense of the "Filioque" against the Orthodox entitled De processu Spiritus Sancti (Basle, 1476)
- a Biblical concordance, Concordantiae biblicae vocum indeclinabilium (Basle, 1476)
- a few works defending the superiority of a general council over the pope
