= Pero Ferrús =

Castilian poet

Pero Ferrús (also written as Pedro Ferrús, Pero Ferruz, Pero Ferrus) (fl. 1380) was a Castilian poet. He lived in Alcalá de Henares.

Ferrús was a Marrano, having converted to Christianity from Judaism. The reasons for conversion by Marranos were various, but it did offer opportunities for advancement within the Christian world. Like several Marrano writers (such as Juan de Valladolid), Ferrús simulated the Christian faith while mocking his former co-religionists in his poetry. In Cantiga 302, he describes himself as being exhausted, seeking rest in a synagogue. Unfortunately, this sleep is disturbed by "Jews with long beards and slovenly garments come thither for early morning prayer." Ferrús himself wrote a poem through which the Jewish community in Alcalá could respond to his jests. In Cantiga 303, they consider his poetry as proceeding from a lengua juglara ("buffoon tongue").

Ferrús wrote his poetry in the Provençal style, during a time in which this style was exceedingly popular at the Castilian court. His poetry celebrates the reign and accomplishments of Henry II of Castile. Ferrús makes an early reference to chivalric romances when he compares, for example, his love for his lady with the riches owned by Rrey Lysuarte (King Lisuarte). He is thus known to have read the popular romance Amadis of Gaul. His contemporary Pero López de Ayala is also known to have read this romance.

== Compositions ==
His poetic compositions appear in the Cancionero de Baena (301-305).

301. Untitled (in the style of Provençal and Galician poetry).

302. Cantiga de Pero Ferruz para los rabíes ("Pero Ferruz's cantiga for the rabbis"). (This poem is thought to have been written prior to the anti-Semitic riots of 1388-1391, due to the tongue-in-cheek humor present in the poet's complaints about his former co-religionists and in the rabbis' response, which would have been impossible towards the end of the century).

303. Respuesta de los rabíes a Perro Ferruz ("The rabbis' response to Perro Ferruz"). (Most likely written by Ferrús himself).

304. Dezir de Pero Ferruz al Rey don Enrique (1379; written in the year of Henry's death). "Dezir" can be translated as a piece of friendly advice.

305. Dezir de Pero Ferruz a Pero López de Ayala (between 1379 and 1390; this cantiga combines the theme of the good life in Castile with a series of loores, or lyric paeans, to a series of Greek, Roman, Biblical, chivalric, and Arab heroes. These include Geryon, Cacus, Scipio Africanus, Joshua, King David, Arthur, Galahad, Roland, Amadis de Gaula, Saladin, Bernardo del Carpio, El Cid, and Ferdinand III of Castile. The list culminates with a mention of Henry II of Castile).

== Sources ==
- Brian Dutton, Joaquín González Cuenca (editors), Cancionero de Juan Alfonso de Baena (Madrid: Visor Libros, 1993), 534-544.
- Enciclopedia Universal Sopena, Tomo Cuarto (Barcelona: Editorial Ramon Sopena, S.A., 1963), 3545.
- Jewish Apostates
