= Içe de Gebir =

Muslim Scholar

Içe de Gebir (Arabic: عيسى بن جابر الشقوبي; Īsā ibn Jābir Al-Sheqoobi; sometimes also found as Isa, Iça, Içe, Yça, Yza, and Ysa, and last name can be also spelled as Gebir, Jabir, or Yábir) was a prominent Faqīh or Muslim legal scholar in the Catholic Kingdom of Castille in the fifteen century CE. He was based in the city of Segovia, but travelled to Aiton, Savoie to assist John of Segovia in the major work of translating the Quran into Castilian Spanish, as it was a rare book in Christian Europe at the time. He is also the author of Sunni Breviary, a thirteen volume collection on Islamic law and daily Muslim practices, based on Prophet Muhammad's teachings. His works became widely used by Mudéjars in Spain because of the loss of Arabic in the region.

== Quran translation ==
In 1455 CE, Isa bin Jabir left his native town of Segovia in central Spain, to travel to the Alps to assist John of Segovia who focused attention on the conversion of Muslims in his later years. John preferred gentle persuasive methods, instead of using force, but achieving this required a good understanding of the Quran. Translations in fifteenth century CE, were not common in Christian Europe, mainly because Muslims did not permit the transfer of the physical copy of the Quran because of concerns that it would not be given the respect they thought it deserved.

Isa bin Jabir, being a Hafiz (Quran), solved this dilemma because he could reproduce an entire Quran from memory. Moreover, he was also a mufti and a well respected imam of the Muslims of Segovia, which ensured accurate translation. According to letters sent by John of Segovia to his colleagues, Isa bin Jabir worked twelve hours a day for four months, stopping only on the Prophet Muhammad's birthday to complete the work.

Unlike today, Muslims at the time did not believe any translation would do justice to the Quran. Therefore, this translation by ibn Jabir was an innovation borne out of circumstances within Spain in the fifteen century. In the introduction of Sunni Breviary, Isa writes:

... because the Moors of Castile, under such great oppression, subjected to the exaction of tribute, forced labor and exhaustion, have declined in their wealth and have lost their schools of Arabic, in order to put right all these things which are wrong, many of my friends, and especially the honorable body which is charged with assessing our collective taxes have pressed me hard, and have asked me to draw up and to copy out in Romance such an outstanding written work concerning our law and our sunna: what every good Muslim should know and have as normal practice... I have striven hard, and have kept in mind that this compilation is directed to those who have succeed us and come after us...
