= San Pedro el Real, Madrid =

Church of San Pedro el Viejo
- Iglesia de San Pedro el Viejo (Spanish)
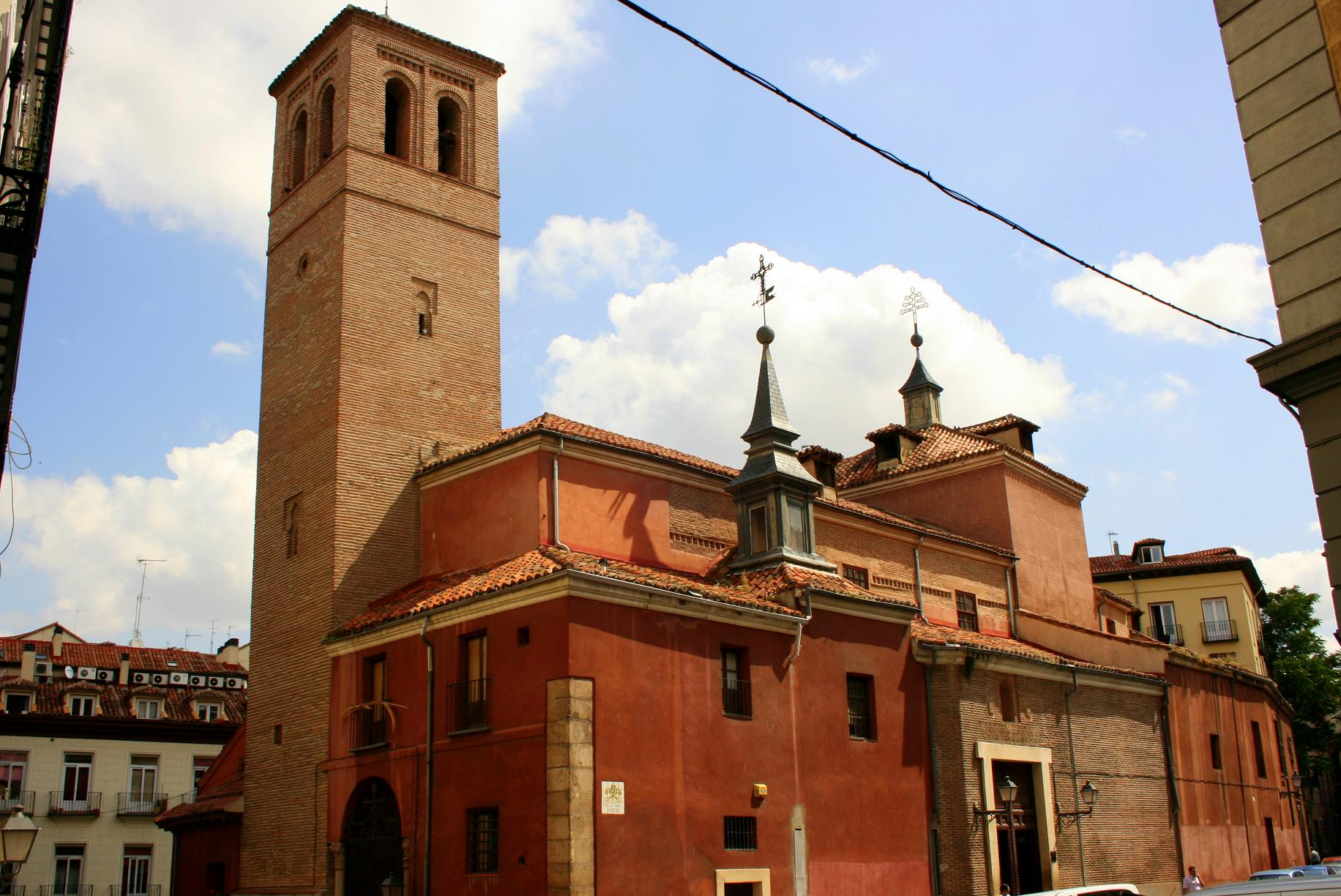

- Location within Spain
- 40.413215°N 3.710456°W
- Location: Madrid, Spain

Spanish Cultural Heritage
- Official name: Iglesia de San Pedro el Viejo
- Type: Non-movable
- Criteria: Monument
- Designated: 1979
- Reference no.: RI-51-0004365

The Church of San Pedro el Real (St Peter the Royal), also known as San Pedro el Viejo, is a small medieval church in central Madrid, Spain.

The initial structure was built in the 14th century, but extensive renovations were performed, and a new facade and portals added in the 17th and 19th centuries. It may have begun as Benedictine monastery, although the Bell-tower has Mudéjar qualities, and resembles a minaret; however, present tower seems to have been worked on in the 14th century when Madrid was firmly in Castilian hands. It was originally built by King Alfonso XI to celebrate his victory in the Battle of Algeciras in 1344.

The church contains the tombs of Kings Alfonso I of Asturias and Ramiro II of León. San Pedro also contains the statue of Jesus known as Jesús el Pobre, or Jesus the Poor, sculpted by Juan Astorga in the late eighteenth century.

The church is located at Calle Nuncio, 14, near the Plaza Mayor.

== See also ==
- Catholic Church in Spain
- List of oldest church buildings
- Romanesque churches in Madrid
