= Cancionero de Baena =

Medieval Spanish compilation of lyric poetry

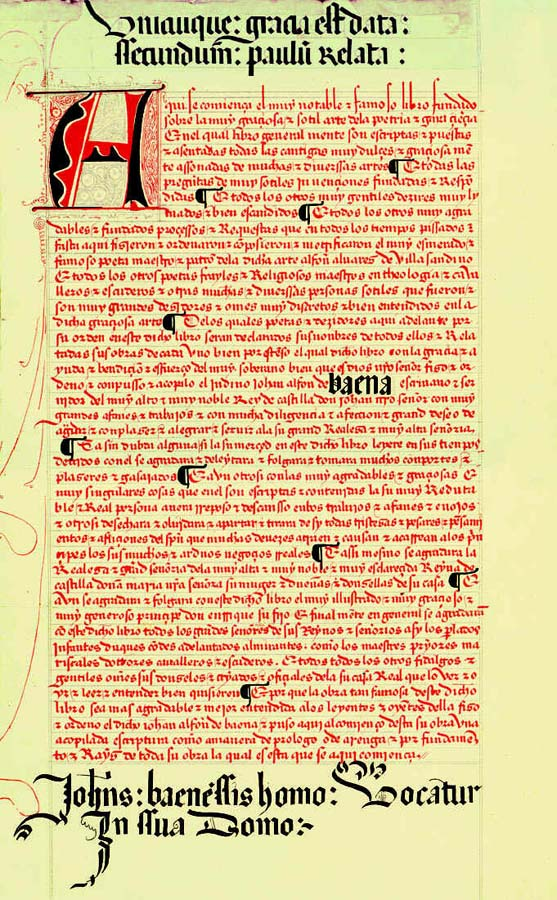
Image of Cancionero de Baena

The Cancionero de Baena ("Songbook of Baena") was compiled between around 1426 to 1430 by the Marrano Juan Alfonso de Baena for the king John II of Castile and the Constable of Castile Álvaro de Luna. Its full title is Cancionero del Judino Juan Alfonso de Baena.

It includes works by 56 poets, each briefly introduced, who were writing from 1370 onwards. Its prologue praises the value of the word and the art of poetry. The Cancionero includes poetry by such poets as Pero Ferrús, Juan Rodríguez de la Cámara, and Francisco Imperial. It includes a poem by Archbishop Pedro Tenorio. The work was first published at Madrid in 1851.

== Sources ==
- SpanishArts.com
- JewishEncyclopedia.com
