= Romanesque churches in Madrid =

First parishes of the Christian Madrid

The first parishes of the Christian Madrid were the ten mentioned in the letter of granting of the Fuero of Madrid; some of them would be rebuilt of mosques prior to the conquest of Alfonso VI of León and Castile, and others built during the Castitian rule of the city established since 1085. All of these were located outside the Christian walls, of poor material resources in its early stages. The only churches that has its original traces are the temples of San Nicolás and San Pedro with towers of 12th and 13th centuries, and Mudéjar, Gothic and Renaissance elements; the San Andrés church also retains some vestiges of medieval manufactures; also there are today remains of the church of San Juan and is documented an old cemetery would be built around the apse of the church of San Andrés, oriented east and there would be buried St. Isidore the Laborer. The urban interior space of Madrid of that time and their population were structured around these parishes, originating the so-called colaciones, religious-administrative units that governed the life in religiously, civilian, politically and administratively and forced a registration to have rights of citizenship. This was one of the elements that favored the progressive cohesion of the local groups and the constitution of the municipalities during the Middle Ages.

The following list summarize the current state of the ten churches.

| The churches mentioned | Renovated, with original elements | Existing remains | Rebuilt in a new design | Demolished |
|---|---|---|---|---|
| Santa María | | Yes | | |
| San Nicolás | Yes | | | |
| San Salvador | | | | Yes |
| San Juan | | Yes | | |
| San Miguel de la Sagra | | | | Yes |
| San Pedro | Yes | | | |
| San Andrés | Yes | | | |
| San Miguel de los Octoes | | | | Yes |
| San Justo | | | Yes | |
| Santiago | | | Yes | |

Other Romanesque churches not mentioned in the granting of the fueros:

- Church of Santa Cruz, built in 13th century, and demolished in 1868.
- Ermita de San Pelayo y San Isidoro was built in Ávila, and moved its ruins in late-19th century to Madrid.

== See also ==
- Romanesque architecture in Spain
