= Towers of the churches of San Salvador and Santa Cruz (Madrid) =

Towers of churches in Madrid, Spain

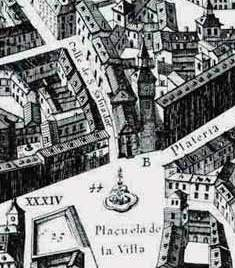
Detail of the famous Plan of Madrid by Pedro Teixeira, can be seen how the Church of San Salvador and its Atalaya de la Villa was in 1656. It had a Herrerian aspect, result of the reforms carried out during the 16th century, which blurred the original medieval traces.

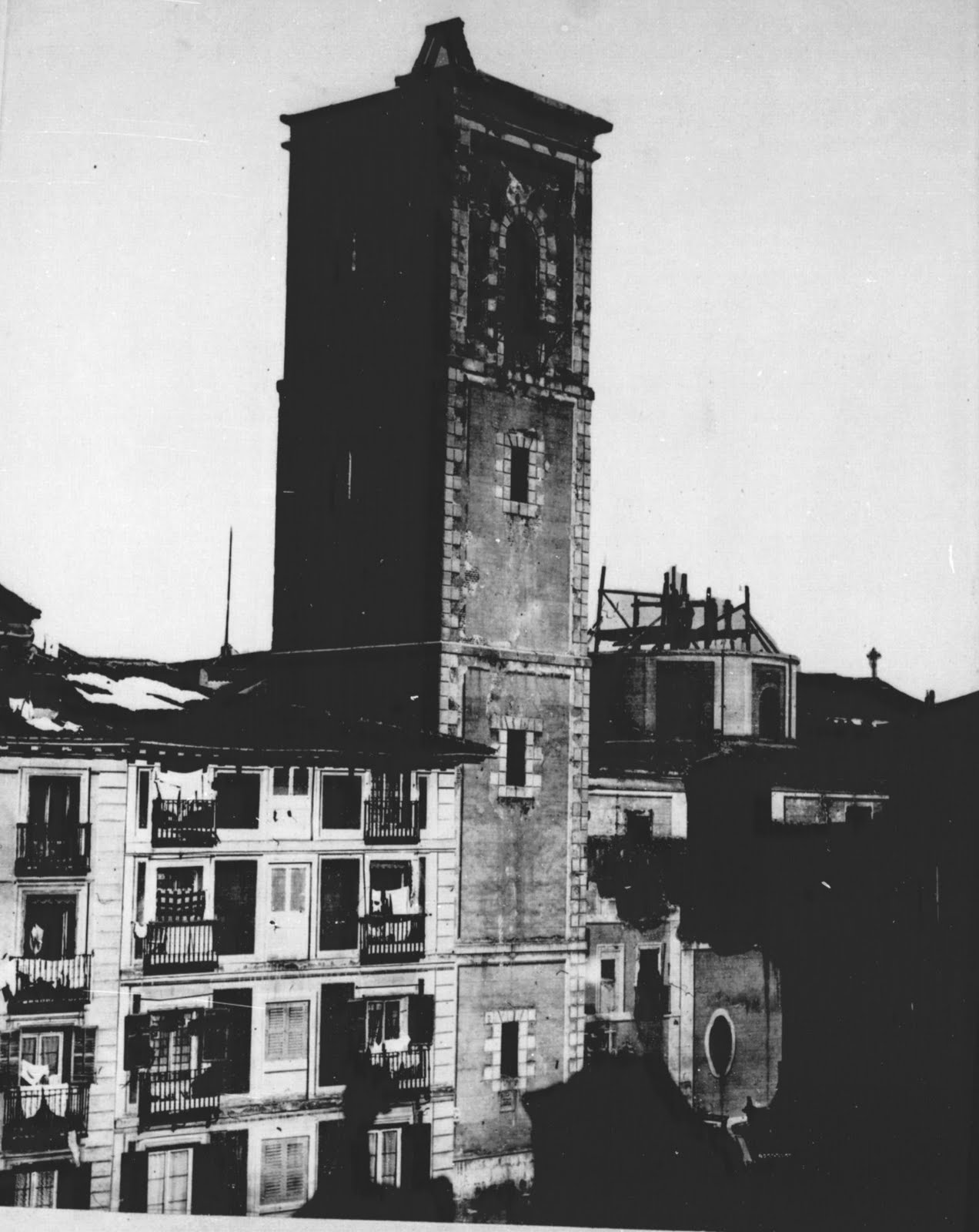
The Atalaya de la Corte in 1868 lopped in the middle of its demolition.

The Towers of the churches of San Salvador and Santa Cruz were the towers of the destroyed churches of San Salvador and Santa Cruz located in Madrid.

It was highlighted the remarkable height of these towers and, above all, that these towers were different from the others in Madrid.

These towers were known among the Madrilenians as Atalaya de la Villa and Atalaya de la Corte. These nicknames arose in the first third of the 17th century.

== Atalaya de la Villa or tower of the church of San Salvador ==
The Atalaya de la Villa was the tower of the church of San Salvador, one of the ten that are cited in the Fuero of 1202, which was located on the Calle Mayor, facing the Plaza de la Villa.

=== Function and description ===
Not only these play a religious activity but also had entrusted civil functions, the result of linking the temples of San Salvador and Santa Cruz with the City Hall of Madrid.

Among its missions it was alert in case of emergencies such as fires and disasters, and warn of the celebration of different municipal acts. Both towers excelled in its front two separate municipal coats of arms, which reported that direct link with the Council.

In this temple it took place the meetings of the Council of Madrid until the construction of the Casa de la Villa in the 17th century.

The call for municipal meetings was done through the bell tower, which also had the task of marking the curfew (at nine in winter and an hour later in summer), when the situation required it. The other highlight element of the Atalaya de la Villa was its clock, the oldest that was in the city.

== Atalaya de la Corte or tower of the church of Santa Cruz ==
The Atalaya de la Corte was one of the tallest towers in the Madrid of the Habsburgs with 144 feet (about 40 meters).

The Atalaya de la Corte was located on the site now occupied by the Plaza de Santa Cruz. It belonged to the church of that name, built in the 13th century, and transformed during the 17th century after catching fire in 1620.

The tower, in particular, rose between 1627 and 1680 from a design by the architect Francisco del Castillo, who devised a solution of four bodies, quadrangular and Herrerian spire with roof lantern, as can be seen in the detail of the plan of Teixeira.

Like the Atalaya de la Villa, it have installed a clock and its bell served to summon the council, because in the church of Santa Cruz it occasionally met the Chamber of Mayors to celebrate their festivals.

== Demolitions ==
The two temples were destroyed in 1868 and with it disappeared the Atalayas.

== See also ==
- Romanesque churches in Madrid
