= Francisco Imperial =

Genoese poet

Francisco Imperial (died between 1403 and 1409) was a Genoese poet who lived in Seville and wrote lyric and allegorical poetry in Spanish around the turn of the 15th century. All of his preserved poetry can be found in the Cancionero de Baena.

Imperial served under the monarch Henry III of Castile (reigned 1390-1406), and one of his poems celebrated the birth of Henry's son John II of Castile. In 1403, Imperial served as the lieutenant of the Admiral of Castile. By 1409, he had apparently died. There is mention of his heirs in a document of this year.

== Life ==
Very little can be said with certainty about the biography of Imperial. In the rubrics that appear above three of his poems in the Cancionero de Baena, we are told that he was born in Genoa and lived in Seville. Gonzalo Argote de Molina, a 16th-century Spanish genealogist, reports that Imperial belonged to one of the noble families of Genoa, from which families two consuls were periodically appointed to promote Genoese interests in Seville. Some have connected Francisco Imperial to a “Jaimes Emperial,” who is mentioned in the will of Pedro the Cruel, suggesting that this Jaimes Emperial may be the father of the poet, but this identification is uncertain. It seems that Imperial served as the lieutenant of the Admiral of Castile: a 1403 letter from King Martin I of Aragon is addressed to “Miçer Francisco Imperial, lugar tenient de almirant de Castilla.” Another document from 1409 refers to the “herederos [heirs] de miçer Francisco Imperial”: this has been viewed as indicating that by this date the poet had died. These documents constitute the extent of our knowledge about Imperial’s life.

The lack of biographical detail on Imperial has led scholars to look in his poetry for clues to his life story. Archer Woodford has suggested that Imperial was an ecclesiastic, drawing this conclusion based on his apparent familiarity with and references to the Catholic liturgy. Colbert Nepaulsingh has asserted that the appointment of Alfonso Enriquez as the admiral of Castile (a position that he claims Imperial could have expected to assume himself), signifies a rupture between Imperial and Henry III of Castile, and interprets some elements in Imperial’s poetry as references to this hostility. All of these suggestions appear to be highly conjectural.

Imperial seems to have been a poet of some note. He is one of the best represented poets in the Cancionero de Baena, and in his Proemio e carta al condestable don Pedro de Portugal, the Marques de Santillana singles out Imperial (and only Imperial, among writers in Spanish) as being worthy of the title of “poeta.” In addition, some of Imperial's poems were well known enough to have elicited poetic responses (respuestas) from his contemporaries.

== Works ==
In his edition of the poems of Imperial, Colbert Nepaulsingh attributes 18 poems to his authorship. As noted above, all of these poems appear in the Cancionero de Baena; some are ascribed explicitly to Imperial in the rubrics, while others have been identified as likely his based on their content and diction. The majority of Imperial’s poetry consists of short lyrics. He wrote several poems on the subject of the nature of the goddess Fortune, in which he challenged the idea that Fortune dispenses justice and is an instrument of divine Providence, emphasizing instead the capriciousness and apparent unfairness of Fortune’s effects. Imperial also wrote numerous love lyrics, among which several in praise of a woman he referred to as “Estrella Diana.” Two poems exist which appear to comment on the arrival in Seville of Angelina de Grecia, a noblewoman, possibly a Hungarian, who had been taken prisoner by Tamerlane and sent to the Spanish as a gift.

However, Imperial is chiefly known for two longer, allegorical works written in arte mayor: The Dezir al nacimiento de Juan II, written in 1405 in celebration of the birth of John II of Castile, the son of Henry III of Castile, and the Dezir a las syete virtudes, Imperial’s longest and most famous work, which recounts a dream-vision of the Seven Virtues and contains many references to the Divine Comedy of Dante.

== Distinctive Features of Imperial’s Poetry ==
Influence of Dante
Dante is a constant presence in Imperial’s poetry, most significantly in the Dezir a las syete virtudes, but elsewhere as well (poems 226 and 232, Cancionero de Baena, J. González Cuenca-B. Dutton (eds.), Visor, Madrid, 1993). One of Imperial’s poems (nº 226) features Dante as a principal character, and in large part consists of the imagined words of the Florentine poet. And when Imperial challenges the idea that Fortune is an extension of divine Providence, he explicitly mentions that he is disagreeing with Dante’s conception of Fortune (found in Inferno VII).

Translations of lines from Dante abound in Imperial, though they are often placed in very different contexts. To take one example, the Dezir al nacimiento de Juan II expresses the hope that the prince Juan will prove to be the “maestro de los que ssaben” (the master of those who know). This is a direct translation of Dante’s description of Aristotle as “il maestro di color che sanno.” (Inferno IV.)

In addition to translating single lines, in the Dezir a las syete virtudes Imperial also frequently translates longer passages from Dante, incorporating passages of as many as six lines into his text. Imperial’s poetry also contains thematic allusions to Dante’s poetry; one of these is the Dantesque simile, examples of which appear throughout the Dezir a las syete virtudes, and another is the employment of a poetic predecessor as a guide on a visionary journey (in Dante, this guide was Virgil; in Imperial, the guide is Dante). Between verbal echoes, allusions, and translations, at least one direct reference to Dante can be found in almost every stanza of the Dezir a las syete virtudes.

Interest in foreign languages
Imperial’s poetry is notable for its employment of foreign words and phrases. Not surprisingly, Imperial introduces many Italianisms into his poetry (most notably, the word “transumanar,” which Dante had coined in the Paradiso). But, in addition, the Dezir al nacimiento de Juan II contains lines that attempt to imitate French, Latin, English and Arabic. Another lyric contains an entire verse in what appears to be a version of Provençal (in this Imperial follows Dante, who placed Provençal verses in the mouth of the spirit of the poet Arnaut Daniel). And one of the poems about Angelina de Grecia contains a word (“cardiamo”) apparently based on Greek, and another word (“ssenguil”) which has been connected to Hungarian.

Some scholars consider Imperial to be a transitional figure, and view his poetry as an anticipation of the arrival of the Renaissance in Spain. Others see Imperial as a poet of little significance, who mechanically incorporated allusions to Dante into his poetry while failing to appreciate Dante's revolutionary qualities. Regardless, for its adoption of exotic, foreign elements, and in particular for its significant debt to Dante, Imperial's poetry stands out from that of his Spanish contemporaries.
