= St Nicholas' Church, Madrid =

Church of San Nicolás
- Iglesia de San Nicolás (Spanish)
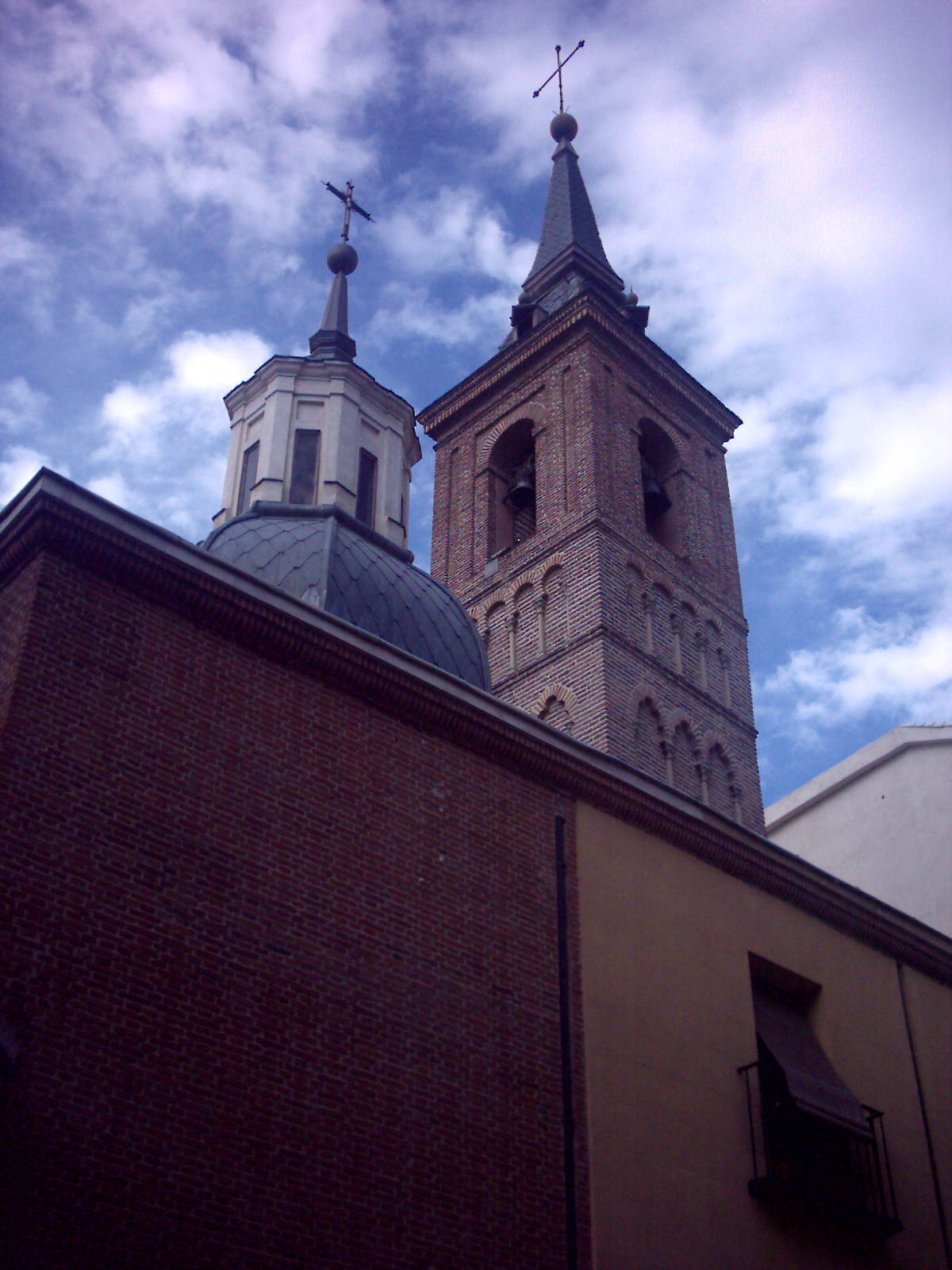

- Location within Spain
- 40.415812°N 3.711985°W
- Location: Madrid, Spain

Spanish Cultural Heritage
- Official name: Iglesia de San Nicolás
- Type: Non-movable
- Criteria: Monument
- Designated: 1978
- Reference no.: RI-51-0004262

The Church of San Nicolás (Spanish: Iglesia de San Nicolás) also known as the church of Church of San Nicolas de Bari, or the Church of San Nicolas de los Servitas, is a Catholic parish church in central Madrid, Spain.

The church dates back to medieval times, although it has been very altered over the centuries. The building was declared Bien de Interés Cultural in 1978. Its tower was already protected, having been declared a national monument in 1931.

It is one of the oldest churches in Madrid.

== History ==
The Church of St. Nicholas in Bari is named in the Law of Madrid of 1202 as one of the oldest parishes in the city. Today it is the oldest church in Madrid, after the demolition of the Church of Santa Maria de la Almudena. Archaeological remains suggest that the church and its bell-tower may have been part of a former mosque. It was likely constructed during the 12th century. The nave and chapels were renovated in the 17th century.

By the 19th century, this church was poor in resources and parishioners. The parish was joined to that of El Salvador in 1805. For a time, the building was abandoned till the church was ceded in 1825 to the Third Order of Servites. When the nearby church of El Salvador was destroyed in 1842, this church gained its former status as a parish church.

In the year 1891 the parish was relocated to a church that had been Anton Martin Hospital in Atocha street, today the Parish of San Nicolas and San Salvador, leaving the old building as the church of "St. Nicholas of the Servites", a name derived from the Servite Order, which still owns it.

At the end of century profile interventions have been implemented, the main one being held in 1983. In some of these interventions was the replacement of the stone, he must be very poor, in the apse, where they appreciate different finishes to the original stone.

== Description ==
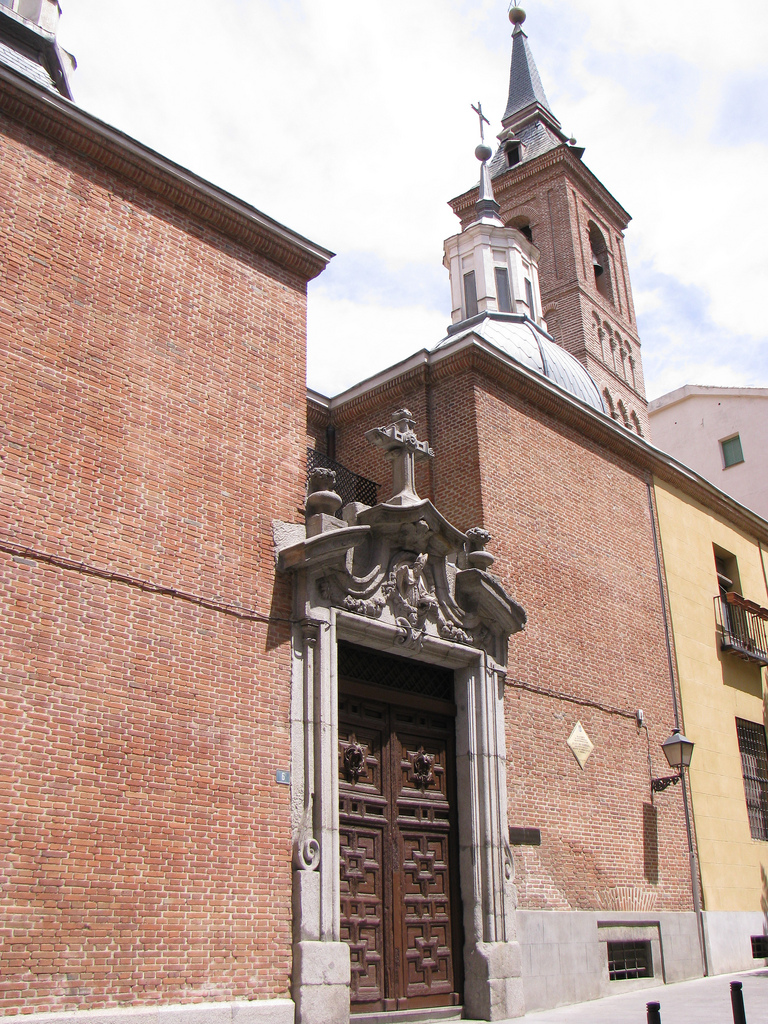
San Nicolas de los Servitas Church, Madrid

Successive restorations that this building has undergone over the centuries have conditioned its current appearance. Built on a three naves, apse has a 15th-century, built with hewn stone from small outcrops of Upper Cretaceous, except the window is illuminated inside with granite recercada. This comes from quarried stone areas The Molar or Torrelaguna (Quarries Redueña). It also highlights the beautiful Mudejar covering the nave and the apse of the Gothic vault.

The most interesting feature of this temple is undoubtedly its tower, dating from the 12th century except the Herrerian style spire tops, made of slate for the 18th century. It has a square and is constructed of brick decorated with blind arches. The brick has dimensions of 30 x 15 cm in the lower parts, but it was the brick bell tower area are smaller and of a different hue. This tower possibly corresponds to one of the Arab minarets preserved in the city. The tower was transformed in the 14th century, when it changed the cover, which was subsequently replaced by the spire.

The church has two entrances, both with jambs and lintels made of granite. The principal is a beautiful cover Baroque carved in the 18th century by Luis Salvador Carmona where is the image of St. Nicholas in a relief. The whole façade is inserted in this cover is made of brick with a layout and dimensions very different from the rest of the building.

The other is a semicircular door, inserted in a socket façade masonry flint evolves vertically curbs brick masonry with drawers, which corresponds to the so-called "rigging Toledo", which also promptly displayed a dolomite-limestone masonry Tertiary. This front end on the upper level with three windows and a balcony on brick.

== See also ==
- Catholic Church in Spain
- List of oldest church buildings
- Romanesque churches in Madrid
