= Juan Alfonso de Baena =

Castilian poet and court scribe

Juan Alfonso de Baena (died c. 1435) was a medieval Castilian poet and scribe in the court of Juan II of Castile. Baena, who was a converso (a Jewish convert to Christianity), is best known for compiling and contributing to the Cancionero de Baena, an important medieval anthology composed between 1426 and 1465 containing the poems of over 55 Spanish poets who wrote during the reigns of Enrique II, Juan I, Enrique III, and Juan II.

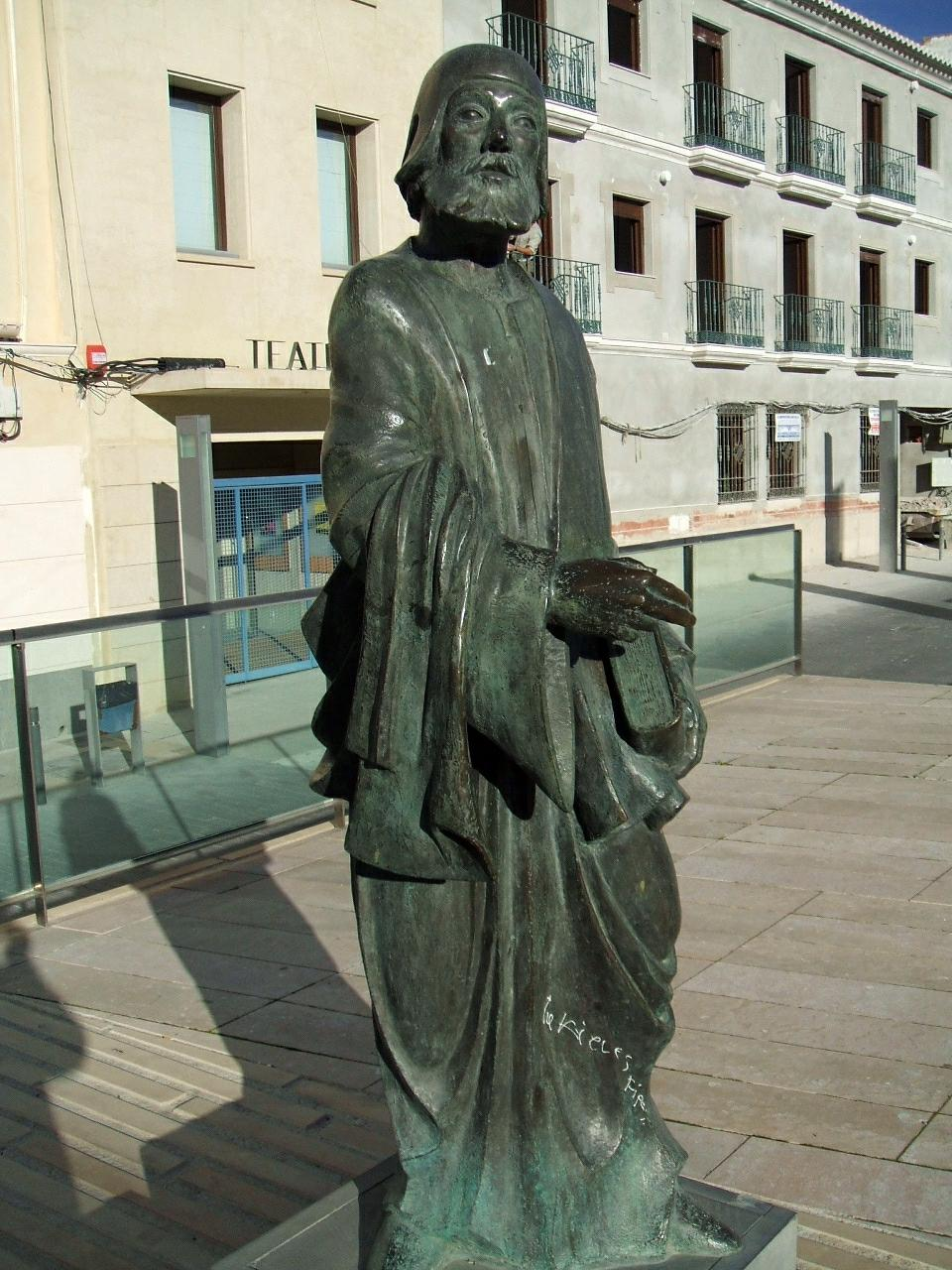
Statue of Juan Alfonso de Baena in his hometown of Baena, Córdoba

== Life ==
=== Early life ===
Not much is known of Juan Alfonso de Baena's life. However, it is known that Baena was born in the late 14th century in the town of Baena in Córdoba, Spain to Jewish parents. According to research by José Manuel Nieto Cumplido, Baena's father was named Pero López and he grew up in the former Jewish quarter of Baena. Other members of Baena's family, including his wife, children and nephew, were also uncovered during this research. Nieto Cumplido discovered that Baena's wife was called Elvira Fernández de Cárdenas, who was the daughter of Lope Ruiz de Cárdenas and María López de Luna. Baena and his wife had at least two children, one also named Juan Alfonso de Baena and the second named Diego de Carmona. Additionally, Baena's nephew (the son of Baena's brother Fernando Alonso de Baena), Antón de Montoro, was a fellow poet. Montoro was a used-clothes dealer called a ropero who also enjoyed wealthy patrons and used his talent at self-deprecating rhymes that highlighted his unfortunate appearance and Jewish blood.

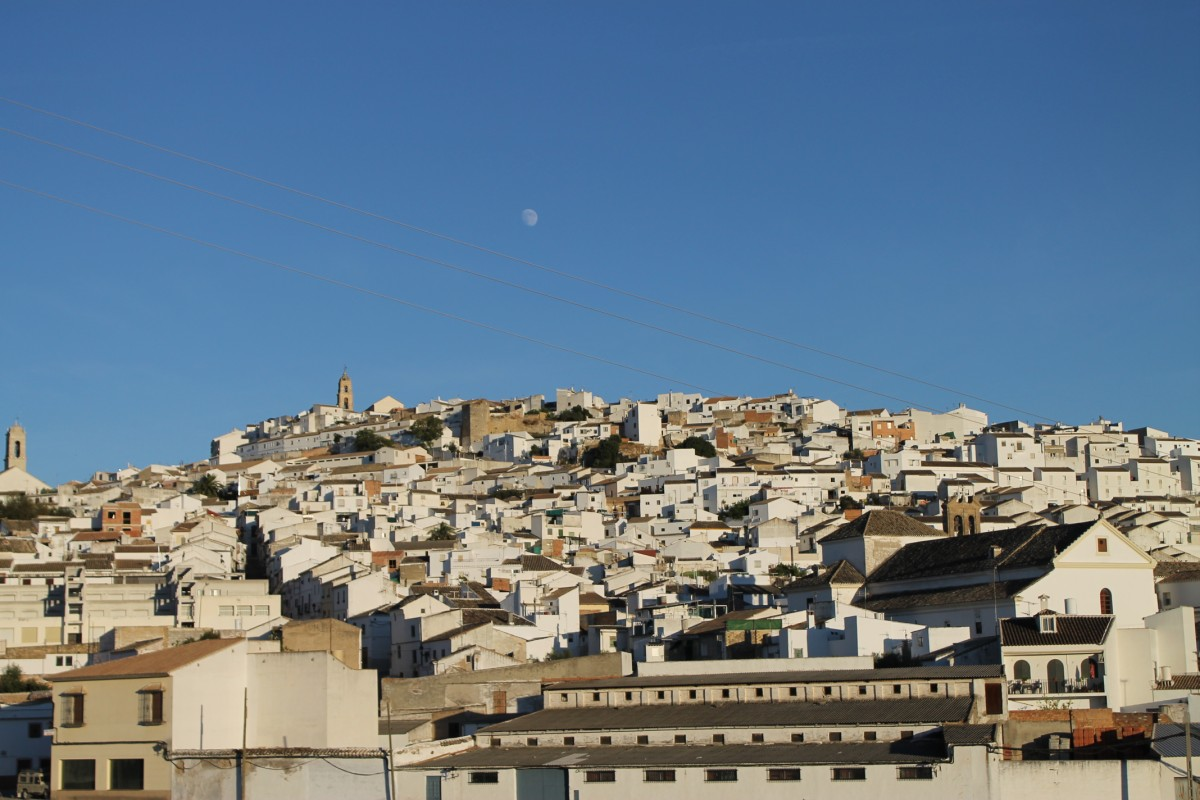
Town of Baena

Baena's hometown is responsible for his last name, as it was not uncommon for people to take their last names from their home regions. This practice was also sometimes utilized by conversos when they took on Christian names. Baena is said to have converted from Judaism to Christianity as a result of the first pogroms in 1391, making him one of the many conversos who converted during this era. From his own poems documented in the Cancionero de San Román, it can be deduced that Baena was not only born in Baena, but was educated there. In this poem that references his education and upbringing, Baena writes,

Yo leí dentro de Baena, / do[nde] aprendí hacer borrones / y comer alcaparrones/ muchas veces sobre cena.

— Juan Alfonso de Baena, Cancionero de San Román

=== Court life and death ===
After his education in Baena (the extent of this education is not known), Baena is said to have worked as a tax collector and bureaucrat during the early years of the 15th century. After this, he appears to have earned a place at the court of Juan II, where he compiled his most well-known work, Cancionero de Baena. At Juan II's court, he was an escribano de cámara, literally a ‘chamber scribe,’ but more accurately, a ‘royal bureaucrat,' and a part-time jester. According to Charles Fraker, this position at court suggests that Baena’s family was traditionally a family of burghers. However, according to the research of Francisco Márquez Villanueva, this role was not held by Baena consistently throughout his life. Because of lapses in output and periods of absence in official court records, de Baena “must have been idle or out of grace for long periods during which” he wrote “many abject petitions to the same high patrons and was also at war” with various other poets defending his own talent and attacking others’, most especially that of the much disliked Daviuelo, with whom the famous Alfonso Álvarez de Villasandino also fought metaphorically in poetic debates.

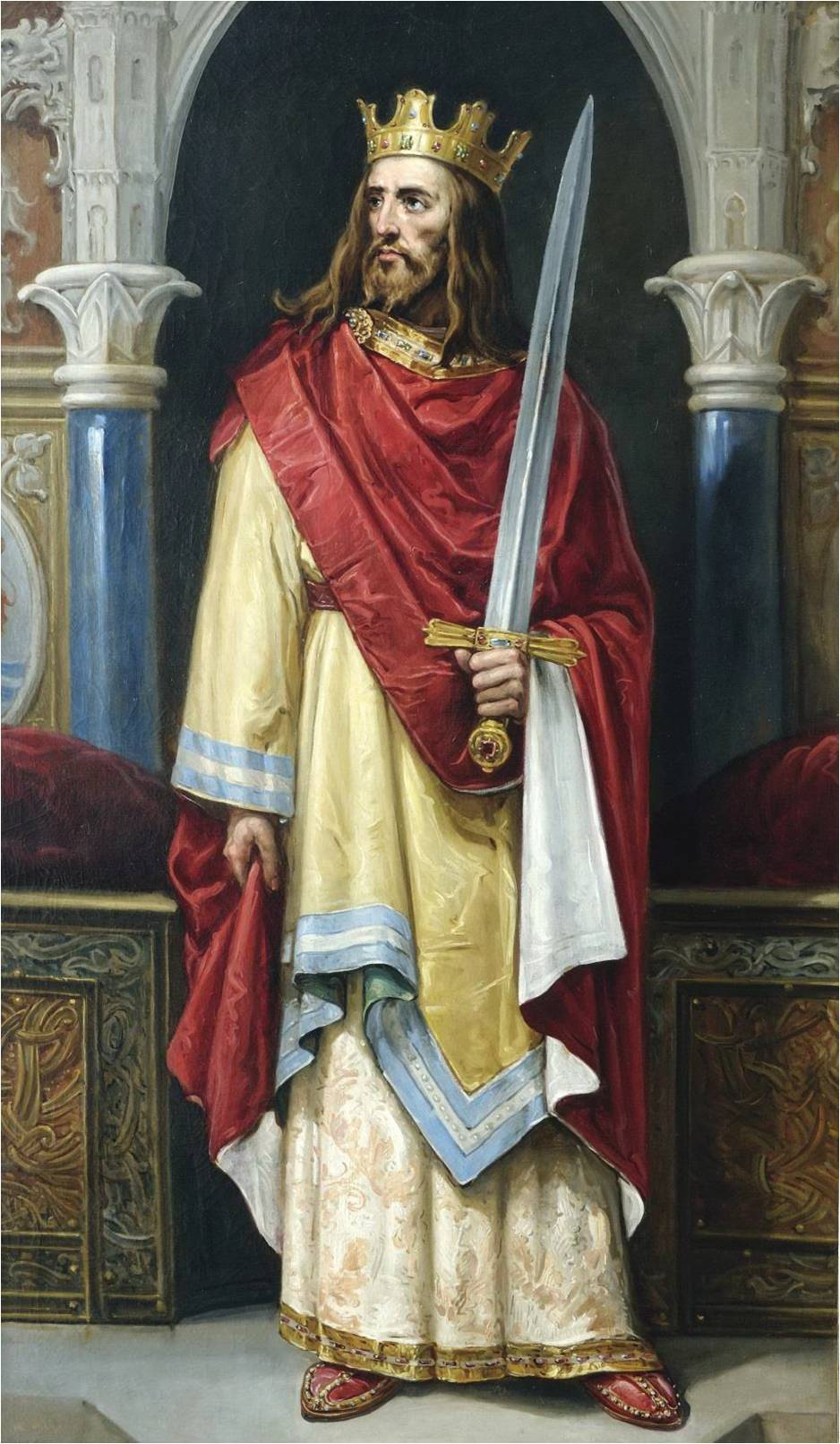
19th century depiction of Juan II

Because of these periods of disgrace, which may have resulted from taking his satirical rhymes, that often critiqued court life, too far, Baena appears never to have risen above the title of court scribe, even though his anthology, his Cancionero, has become the most important literary product of Juan II's court. According to Amador de los Ríos, however, Baena was not simply a royal scribe but a secretary to Juan II. Before working for the king directly, Baena is said to have held the patronage of Diego Fernández de Córdoba. After decades spent in and out of favor, acting as royal scribe and secretary while composing his own court writing, Juan Alfonso de Baena died during the later years of Juan II's reign.

While Baena's death date had long been a mystery, in 1979, Nieto Cumplido discovered manuscripts that suggest Baena died in 1435.

=== Heritage ===
Baena's Jewish heritage can be deduced from his own writings. In the kind of poems Baena and his fellow court fools wrote, the object was often to be as self-deprecating as possible with the ultimate goal of making the court, especially the royal family, laugh. The trait that Baena mocked about himself most of all was his ‘Jewishness,' which he would emphasize for comedic effect, referencing many Jewish stereotypes of the time. About the Cancionero in its prologue, Baena states more seriously, “El cual dicho libro...hizo y ordenó y compuso y recopiló el [judino] Juan Alfonso de Baena.” Here, Baena takes credit for compiling the anthology by calling himself, 'el judino' Juan Alfonso. As judino (spelled indino in the original manuscript) is a pejorative term for Jew in Spanish, it is evident that even Baena himself admitted to and identified with his heritage, even in formal matters.

Also customary for jester-poets like Baena were feuds, called poetic debates, performed for court amusement but sometimes in earnest, among the authors, dueled through fixed-rhymed poems requestas that pit poet against poet that became increasingly absurd insults the longer they went on. Insults against Baena also reveal his heritage. These include references to eggplants, a vegetable that had become a stereotypical identifier of Jewish (and Muslim) food during this era. One such insult by Rodrigo de Harana directed specifically at Baena states, “a vos que andades sin obediencia/apóstata hecho con mucha blandura,” an insult that accuses Baena of apostasy, suggesting he has converted. These references, and the fact that nearly every court jester writing during this era was a Jewish convert (with the exception of Villasandino, one of Baena's most formidable literary adversaries and perhaps the most famous court fool of the era) make almost certain of Baena's heritage despite a lack of official documentation.

== Work ==
=== Cancionero de Baena ===
Cancioneros, or songbooks, were compilations of lyrical poetry most popular during the second half of the 14th century and the first half of the 15th century, though they first appeared in Iberia as early as the beginning of the 13th century in Galicia. In Iberia, these songbooks were originally compilations of Galician courtly poems and eventually broadened in both scope and language. According to Yirmiyahu Yovel, the poems contained in the Iberian cancioneros used “unadorned language and simple rhyme, the poems dealt, sometimes irreverently, with current events, people, social habits, and institutions, and they also served their authors to quarrel, flatter, defame, and supplicate." In this way, cancioneros could serve as an insightful or even critical looks into the social and political realities of the royal courts and preserved vast amounts of medieval Iberian court poetry.

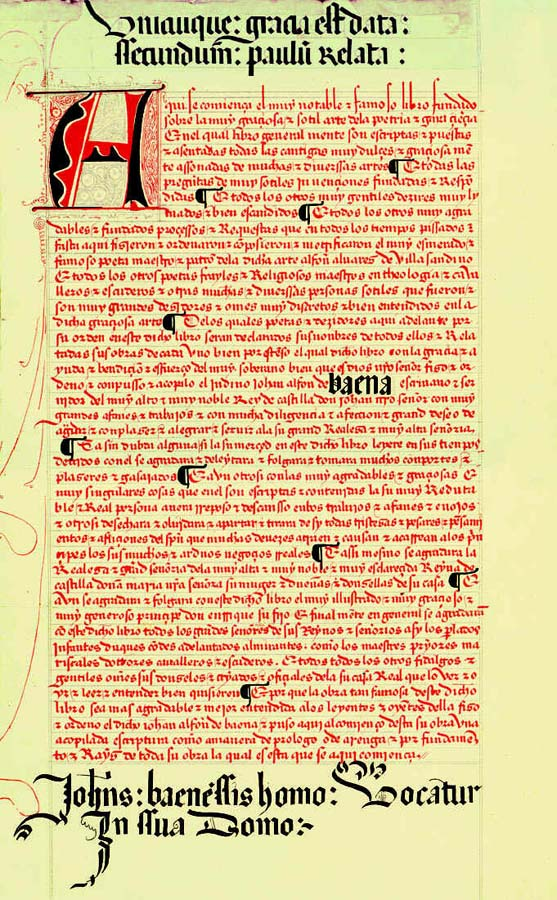
The Surviving 15th Century Manuscript of Cancionero de Baena

The particular Cancionero in question, the one compiled by Baena, consists of 576 poems composed by 56 poets. These poems were written between the beginning of the Trastámara reign in the mid 14th century to the mid 15th century, which included the reigns of Enrique II (1369-1379), Juan I (1379-1390), and Enrique III (1390-1406), and Juan II (1406-1454). Some sources date the Cancionero from 1426 to 1430, while others believe it is from the mid 1440s. If Baena was the only one who added poems to the anthology, this would place its compilation during the earlier dates. However, according to Alberto Blecua’s and Vicente Beltrán’s research, it appears that some poems were added to the Cancionero by other compilers after his death, making later dates a possibility for the completion if not the genesis of the anthology. Therefore, the best compilation dates for the Cancionero are between 1426 and 1430 for Baena’s personal contributions and between 1449 and 1465 for the later additions. The Cancionero was compiled during the reign of Juan II while Baena was working in his court, and, consequently, dedicated the songbook to the king. Cancionero de Baena is the oldest Castilian example of this kind of songbook. The Cancionero contains many of Baena’s own works, including some of his satire and poetical letters, for which he is known.

The Cancionero de Baena signals a transition from Galician-Portuguese to Castilian as the prestige language of court poetry in Iberia, as the previous such anthologies had been written in Galician-Portuguese. Baena’s cancionero did more than record Castilian court poems in the style of the Galician-Portuguese troubadours, however. Baena also included poems from less prestigious origins than the royal court and even some more serious “intellectual poetry incorporating symbol, allegory, and classical allusions in the treatment of moral, philosophical, and political themes.” Indeed, Baena’s compilation cannot be said to be systemic anyway, as it includes an indiscriminate number of genres and themes. This, in and of itself makes it important as it demonstrates a more complete view of medieval Castilian literature. Canciones de amor, poetic debates, and moralizing texts make up the three main genres of the anthology. Canciones de amor are love poems based on the Provençal canso form. Poetic debates are the poems mentioned previously that pit two poets against each other in “dialogues between two or more poets in which the respondent must follow the meters and rhymes of the initial poem.” These poetic debates were represented chiefly by Baena’s inclusion of his own work in the compilation and the inclusion of Villasandino’s. Finally, the moralizing texts are “reflections on mortality, fortune, and the fall of the great, and the vanity of human life apart from God.”

Baena’s prologue to the Cancionero de Baena, called the Prologus, is also of literary note. It is the first prologue of an anthology to also serve as literary criticism. In fact, Baena’s prologue inspired a tradition of theoretical introductions in Castilian in the following years. In this prologue, Baena asserts that poetry is a courtly pastime with “intellectual and therapeutic significance,” a sentiment that harkens back to the 14th century Catalan treatises on “la gaya sciència de trobar” or ‘the gay science of poetry,’ sponsored by the courts of Juan I and Martín the Humane, which established poetry as a “rhetorical display of courtliness” and provided rules for the ideal linguistic and structural composition of courtly poems. In Baena’s own definition in the Prologus, he provides a description of the ideal courtly poet. This poet is “divinely inspired, widely read and travelled, eloquent and witty.” Indeed, these traits are typical in defining not only poets but courtiers in general during this era. In fact, these traits are very similar to and can be surmised to have been inspired by Alfonso X’s writing in General Estoria. In addition to adhering to these traits inspired by Alfonso X, Baena’s ideal poet is also a lover and if he is not in love in reality, he engages in the act of pretending to be in love. This attitude about the importance of being in love, or acting as such is evident when Baena states in the prologue, “que sea amadore e que siempre se preçie e se finja de ser enamorado, porque es opinión de muchos sabios que todo omne sea enamorado, conviene a saber,” which means, “that one would be a lover and always pride oneself and pretend to be in love, because it is of the opinion of many wise ones that all who are in love are agreeable to knowledge.” Here, Baena defines the ideal poet, and therefore the person capable of composing the ideal form of poetry as one who is in love, whether truly or as an affected state to be open to the kind of knowledge that produces worthy poetry. By providing a “theoretical justification in his Prologus, Baena ensures the virtue and prestige of his collection before his patron,” by associating himself and poetry in general with courtly behavior. Through this theoretical justification, Baena’s makes his own cancionero an important conservation of courtly knowledge while at the same time contributing to contemporary literary theory about the nature and merit of poetry and the poet.

==== Publishing history ====
The only surviving manuscript of the cancionero is housed in the National Library of France in Paris. It is a copy that dates from approximately 1465, 20 to 40 years after the original was composed and presented to Juan II. The surviving manuscript, written on paper, was housed at El Escorial from the middle of the 18th century, according to a detailed description by a man named Rodrigo de Castro during the era. According to Alberto Blecua’s work, in which he attempts to reconstruct the original order, the surviving copy had a different order than the original form of the compilation. Indeed, much of his research concludes that the ''Cancionero'' that readers are familiar with today was altered by compilers other than Baena, most probably after his death, as the latest poems were composed as late as 1449. Blecua deduced that Baena did not include the works of González de Mendoza, Garci Fernández de Jerena, Rodríquez del Padrón, nor those of various other poets. Additionally, Baena’s work was more strictly organized in chronological and thematic order than the present version.

In the modern era, the cancionero became more easily accessible in 1851, when it was first published in print form in Madrid in 1851 by the publishers Gayangos and Pidal.

=== Other work ===
Many of Baena’s works do not appear in his cancionero. A number of Baena's poems appear in the Cancionero de San Román. In fact, one of his largest and most interesting pieces is found in this particular cancionero. Called Dezir, it is a poem of 218 verses. Unlike the comedic nature of most of his poems found in the Cancionero de Baena, this poem is more serious in topic and tone. Dezir is addressed to Juan II, whom Baena calls “alto rey muy soberano/delos reynos de castilla.” After a lengthy address, which goes on to further compliment the king, Baena advises the king of the political actions he ought to take in order to strengthen the country. While this advice shares many similarities with Juan de Mena’s Laberinto, in Dezir, Baena also makes his own more unique contributions. One of these contributions is, using the metaphor of illness, the characterization of Castile as in need of the medicine of the king’s strong rule, a rule that would eliminate the corrupt local governments of the time and further unite the nation, in order to better defeat the threats of Muslim forces. To prove the merit of his advice, Baena uses Alfonso VIII of Castile as an example of what Juan II ought to do and how such a strategy has been successful in the past. According to Baena, Alfonso’s close leadership brought about stronger national unity and the defeat of many Muslims in Spain at that time. Baena’s Dezir shows a side of the author that has largely been unstudied. Baena was not only a gifted compiler, poet, and jester, he also composed political works that showed a greater depth of knowledge and intellect than previously speculated.

=== Literary style ===
Baena’s literary style relied greatly on the use of self-deprecating humor and the ability to mock both himself and others without falling from grace and offending any powerful courtiers. This self-deprecation and other forms of mockery was also customary for his contemporary court poets as well, including Villasandino (the only non converso poet writing in this genre) and Baena’s nephew Montoro. For Baena, this kind of self-mockery included pointing out “his own ugliness and dwarf-like stature.” In this era, to be a successful fool in court, Baena had to rely on more than “plain ugliness or a crooked spine.” In order to “attain the highest metaphysical level of ‘madness,’” a trait which defined what it was to be a medieval fool and court poet, it was necessary to “open wide the closet and reveal the skeleton within. And this is what Baena and many others did, seizing every opportunity to make fun of their own Jewish blood and former faith.” Instead of hiding their Jewish roots, as might be expected during this era of intolerance and even persecution of Jews in Spain, in their writing, converso fools were expected to accentuate their ‘mad’ pasts in order to make the court laugh. Here, Baena’s style worked to diminish the perceived threat of his Jewish Otherness until it was reduced to nothing more than amusing stereotypes about large noses and harmless dietary differences.

One such example of Baena’s use of self-deprecation occurs in the Cancionero:

Senior, yo comi salmon e coruina / e otros pescados de grant gentileza, / enpero sepades que pes de vileza / nunca jamas entro en mi cosina.

— Juan Alfonso de Baena, Cancionero de Baena

In this excerpt, Baena mocks the traditional Jewish diet that excludes shellfish and other bottom-feeding fish, calling them ‘pes de vilesa’ or ‘vile fish’ but includes seafood such as salmon (salmon) and sea bass (coruina) which he calls ‘pescados de grant gentileza’ or ‘fish of great charm’. Here, Baena invokes both Jewish stereotypes and courtly distinctions of high and low classes in a way that can be perceived to mock most obviously, himself, but to a degree the court itself. One of the privileges of Baena’s position as both an insider and an outsider in Juan II’s court was to use his position, not only, to subvert his own past through jokes but also to subvert the court reality through caricatures, mockeries, and impersonations that ultimately led to periods out of the king’s favor.
