= Timurid relations with Europe =

Central Asian-European diplomacy in the Middle Ages

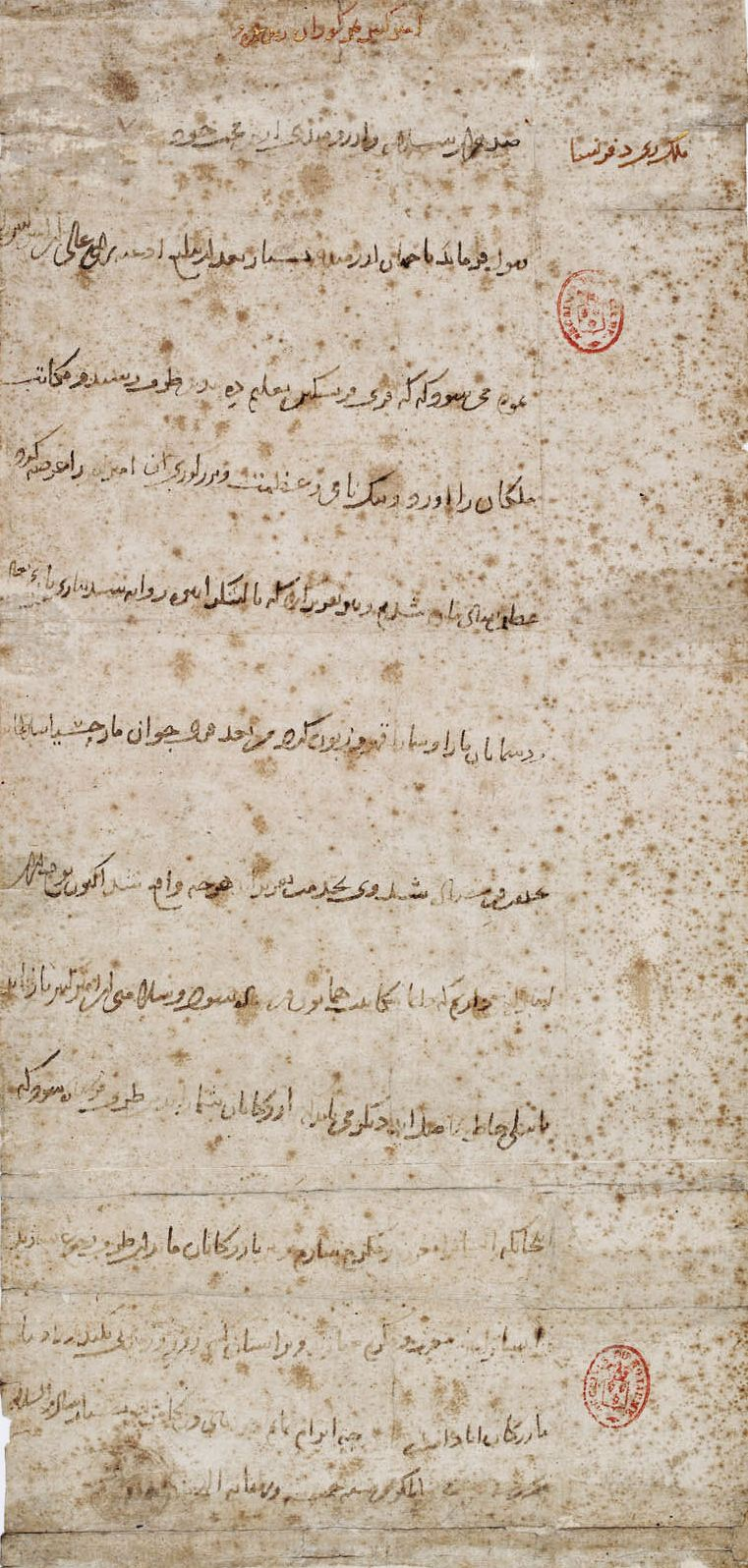
Persian letter of Timur to Charles VI of France, 1402

Timurid relations with Europe developed in the early 15th century, as the Persianate Turco-Mongol ruler Timur and European monarchs attempted to operate a rapprochement against the expansionist Ottoman Empire. A strong hostility remained between the Timurds and the Ottoman Turks as well as the Egyptian Mamluks.

Although his self-proclaimed title was ghazi (or "conqueror"), Timur maintained relatively friendly relations with Europe. Europe at the time was threatened by the conquering armies of the Ottoman Turks and was desperate for allies. Timur likewise saw the European states as allies to help him fight his Ottoman enemies. After his successful campaigns in the Indian subcontinent in 1399, Timur took Aleppo and Damascus in 1400. He fought and eventually vanquished the Ottoman ruler Bayazid I at the Battle of Ankara in July 1402.

== Relations with Spanish and French kingdoms ==
Prior to the Battle of Ankara, as the Hundred Years' War was going through a quiet phase, many European knights and men-at-arms sought adventure abroad and some of these ended up serving in Tamerlane's armies. There is one recorded instance of a French squire by the name of Jacques du Fey who served under Timur though the exact circumstances of his service are unknown. What is known is that Timur released him so he could rejoin his countrymen for the crusade against the Ottomans which ended in disastrous failure at the Battle of Nicopolis. After the battle, the Ottoman sultan ordered many prisoners to be executed but Tartar warriors, sent by Timur to answer the Ottomans' call for Jihad, recognized Jacques du Fey and were able to save him from execution.

At the time of the Battle of Ankara, two Spanish ambassadors were already with Timur: Pelayo de Sotomayor and Fernando de Palazuelos. There was the possibility of an alliance between Timur and the European states against the Ottoman Turks attacking Europe. There was a clear motive for Timur, who wanted to surround his Ottoman and Mamluk enemies in an offensive alliance.

These mirrored attempts towards a Franco-Mongol alliance a century before.

Timur sent an ambassador to the court of Charles VI, in the person of the Dominican friar Jean, Archbishop of Sultānīya. Jean arrived in Paris on 15 June 1403. Timur's letter was delivered to Charles VI, describing him as:

"The most serene, most victorious King and Sultan, the king of the French and many other nations, the friend of the Most-High, the very beneficent monarch of the world, who has emerged triumphant from many great wars."

— Letter from Timur to Charles VI.

Timur offered an offensive and defensive alliance to Charles VI, as well as the development of commercial relations. Charles VI was only able to send an answer and an envoy shortly before Timur's death (1405).

Relations with Spain were also developed. In the view of the Spanish historian Miguel Ángel Ochoa Brun, the relations between the courts of Henry III of Castile and that of Timur were the most important episode of the mediaeval Castilian diplomacy. Timur sent to the court of Castile a Chagatay ambassador named Hajji Muhammad al-Qazi with letters and gifts.

In December 1402, Timur came into direct conflict with a small European outpost on the Anatolian coast. The fortress and harbour of the city of Smyrna were held by the Knights Hospitaller. Timur besieged Smyrna for a fortnight and captured it. This action caused some consternation in Aragon and Castile.

== Embassy of Ruy González de Clavijo ==
In return, King Henry III of Castile sent an embassy to Timur's court in Samarkand on 21 May 1403, led by Ruy González de Clavijo, with two other ambassadors, Alfonso Paez and Gomez de Salazar. On their return in 1406, Timur said that he regarded the king of Spain "as his very own son".

According to Clavijo, Timur's good treatment of the Spanish delegation contrasted with the disdain shown by his host toward the envoys of the "lord of Cathay" (i.e., the Ming dynasty Yongle Emperor). The Chinese ruler, whose title was "lord of the realms of the face of the earth", was called by Timur (to Clavijo's face) a "thief and a bad man", and his ambassadors were seated below the Spaniards.

Clavijo's visit to Samarkand allowed him to report to the European audience on the news from Cathay (China), which few Europeans had been able to visit directly in the century that had passed since the travels of Marco Polo. Clavijo's account reported, even if in a garbled form, on the recent civil war between the descendants of the Hongwu Emperor. The Spanish were able to talk to some of the Chinese visitors, and learned about the caravan routes between Samarkand and Cambalu (Beijing). Besides telling the European readers about the Cathayan capital Cambalu, which he was told was "the largest city in the world", and the mighty armies of that country, Clavijo also—mistakenly—reported that the new emperor of Cathay had converted to Catholicism. Thus his report served as one of the factors supporting the European belief in the widespread presence of Christianity in Cathay, which was to persist until the early 17th century and to be one of the reasons for sending the famed Bento de Góis expedition in 1603.

== Relations after Timur ==
Timur died in 1405, and his son Shah Rukh continued to campaign against the Ottomans, creating hope in the Christian West that the invading Ottoman Empire might be diverted away from Europe.

A Bavarian adventurer, Johann Schiltberger, is known to have remained in the service of Timur from 1402 to 1405. Also, numerous Venetian and Genoese traders were active in Sultaniya at that time, since the time of their establishment in Sultaniya under the Il-Khanids.

The next contacts between Europe and Persia would be those of the Venetian traveler Niccolo da Conti from 1420 to 1425. Contacts failed to develop much further thereafter, although Spain's desire for rapprochement with the Mongols remained until the time of Christopher Columbus in 1492, whose objective was to reach the Great Khan in China.

The story of Tamerlane has a long legacy associated with Orientalism in Europe, with such publications as Tamburlaine the Great by Christopher Marlowe in 1590 and Handel's opera Tamerlano in 1724.
