= Church of San Andrés (Madrid) =

Church in Madrid, Spain

- Iglesia de San Andrés (Spanish)
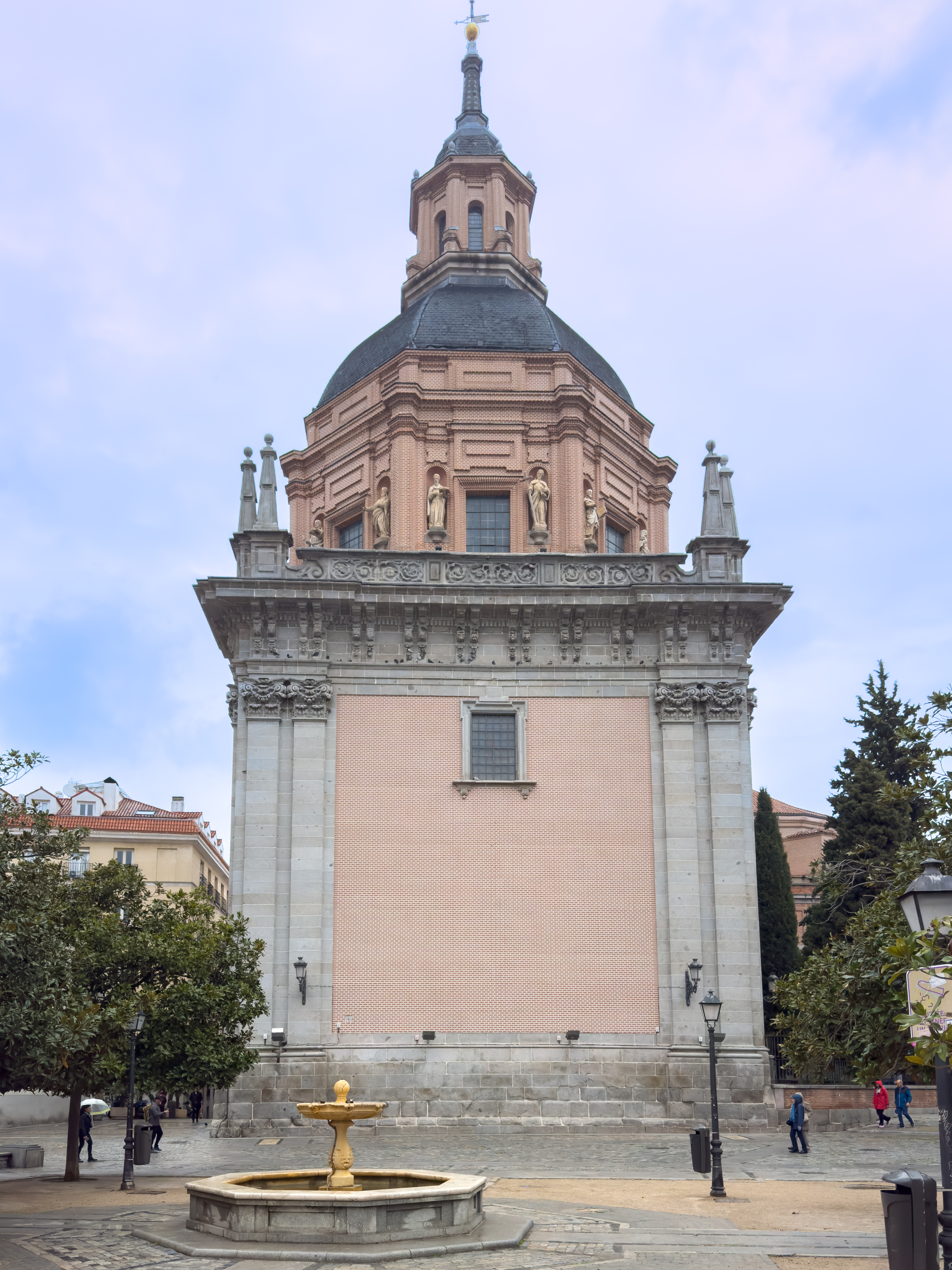

- Location within Spain
- 40.412203°N 3.711502°W
- Location: Madrid, Spain

Spanish Cultural Heritage
- Official name: Iglesia de San Andrés
- Type: Non-movable
- Criteria: Monument
- Designated: 1995
- Reference no.: RI-51-0009076

The Church of San Andrés (Saint Andrew) (Spanish: Iglesia de San Andrés) is a church in Madrid, Spain. It was declared a Bien de Interés Cultural in 1995.

It was built using the ruins that had a previous church in the same place. The primitive church in turn was previously occupied by a mosque located next to the albarrana tower in what was later the Palacio de Laso de Castilla, residence of the Catholic Monarchs and Cardinal Cisneros when they were in Madrid. The previous church had been frequented as a parish church by the patron saint of Madrid, St. Isidore the Laborer, and his wife Santa María de la Cabeza, who lived nearby.

The adjacent chapel of San Isidro was built at the site of the saint's house. Its construction began in 1657, after the saint was canonized in 1622. Further reconstructions were performed in 1663 and 1669, and later in 1783 and 1789. The initial construction in Baroque style was fashioned by José de Villarreal, and later Pedro de la Torre and Juan de Lobera. Much of the internal decoration, including paintings, was destroyed at the beginning of the Spanish Civil War by the Communist and Socialist forces.

== Gallery ==
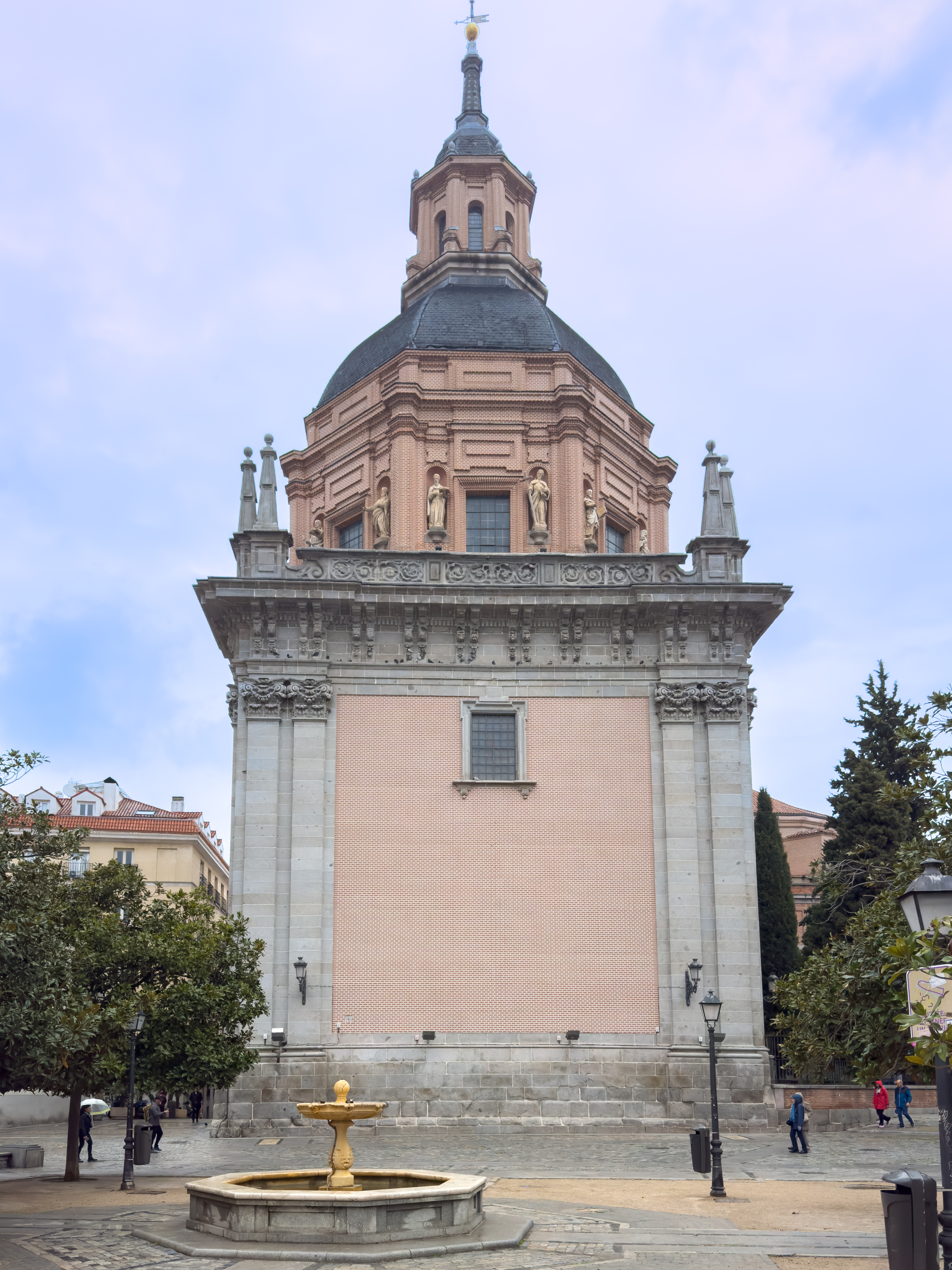

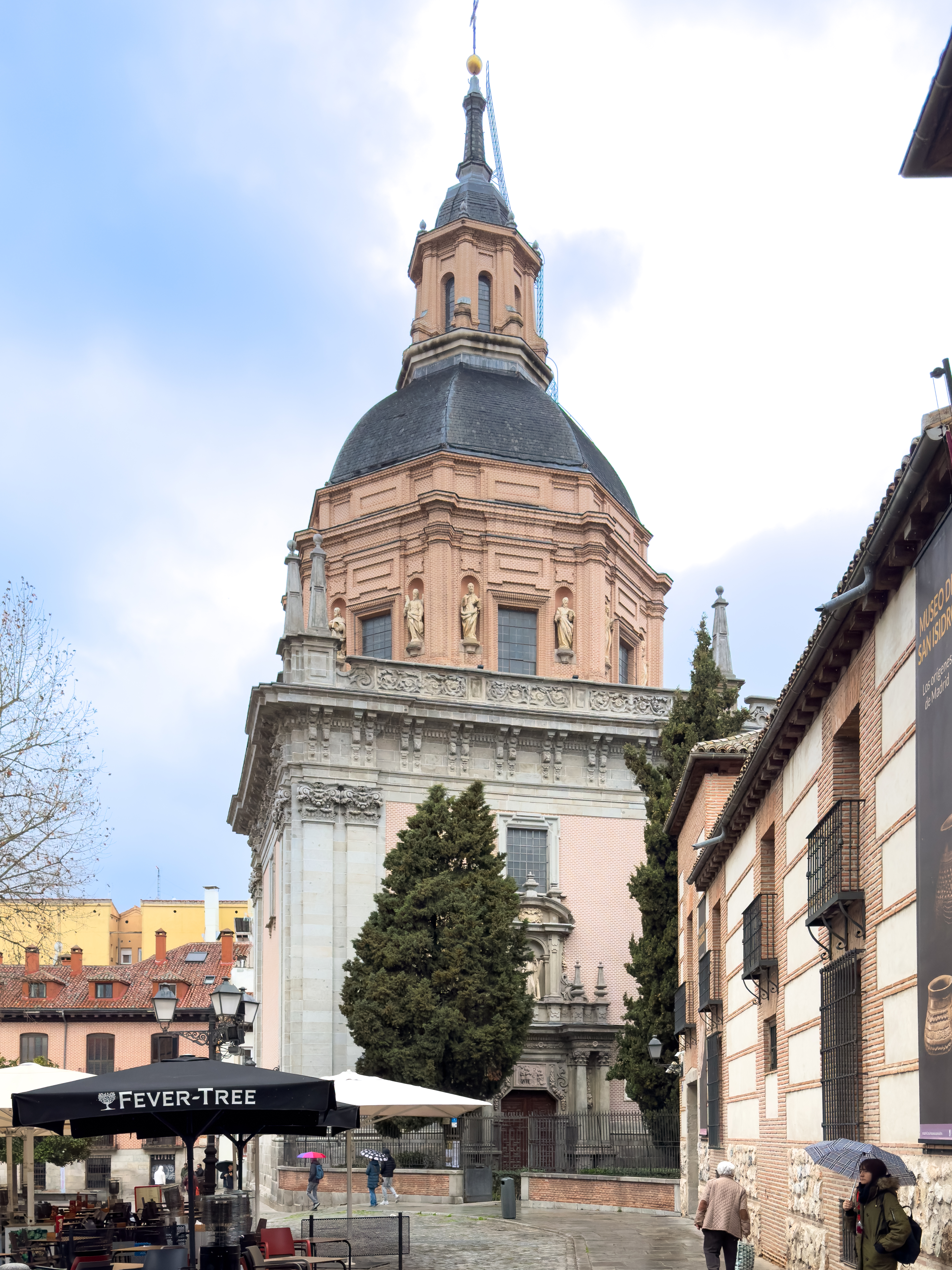

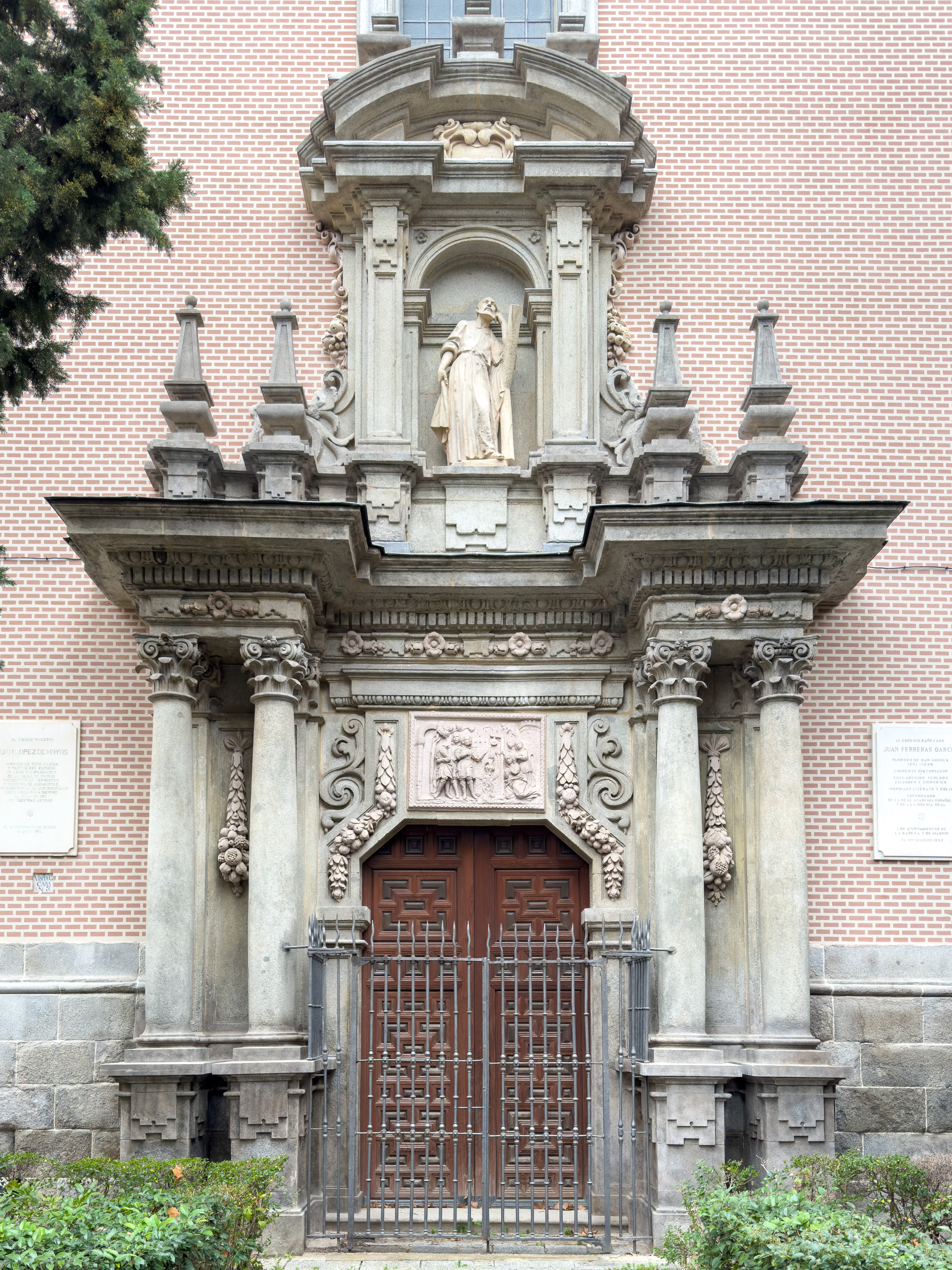

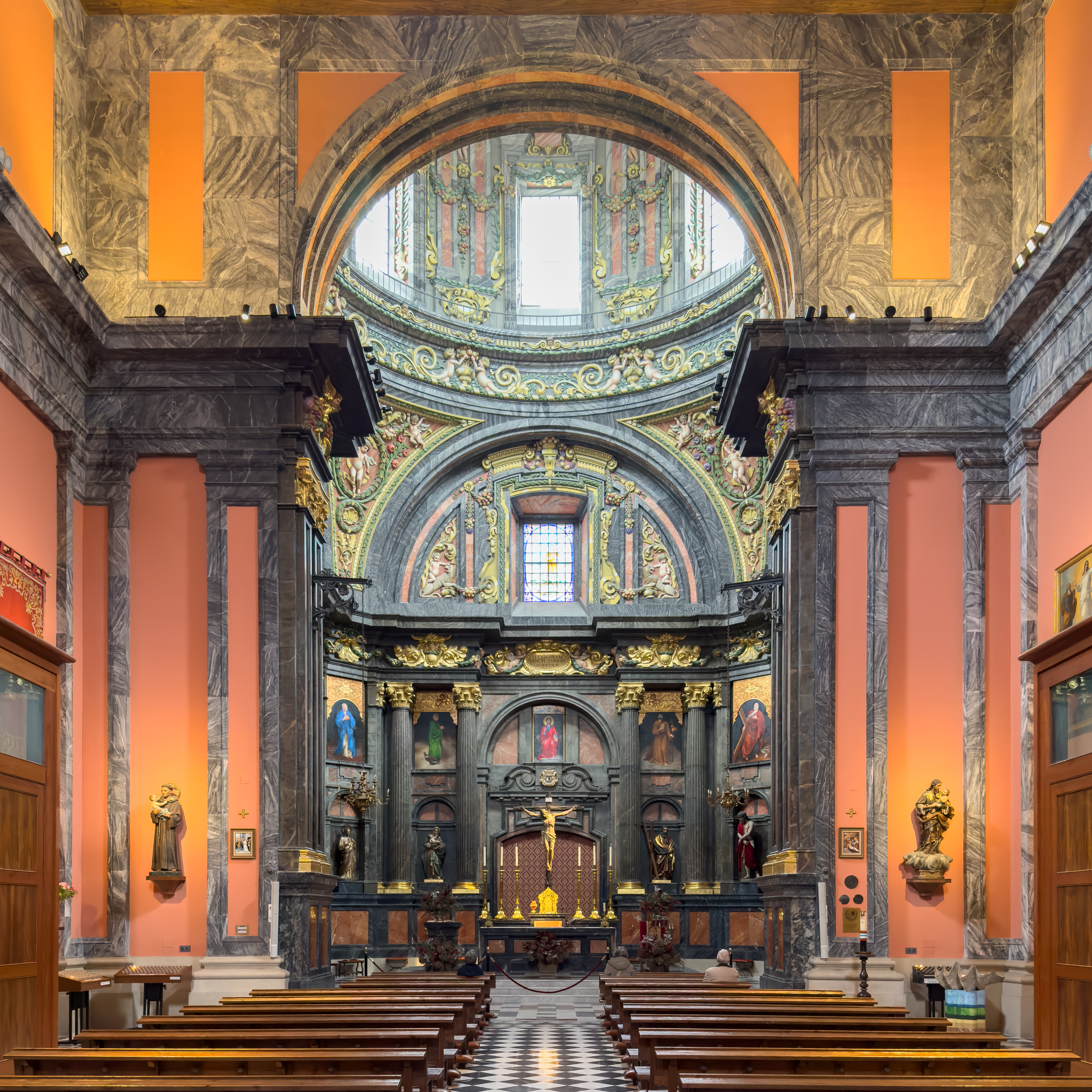

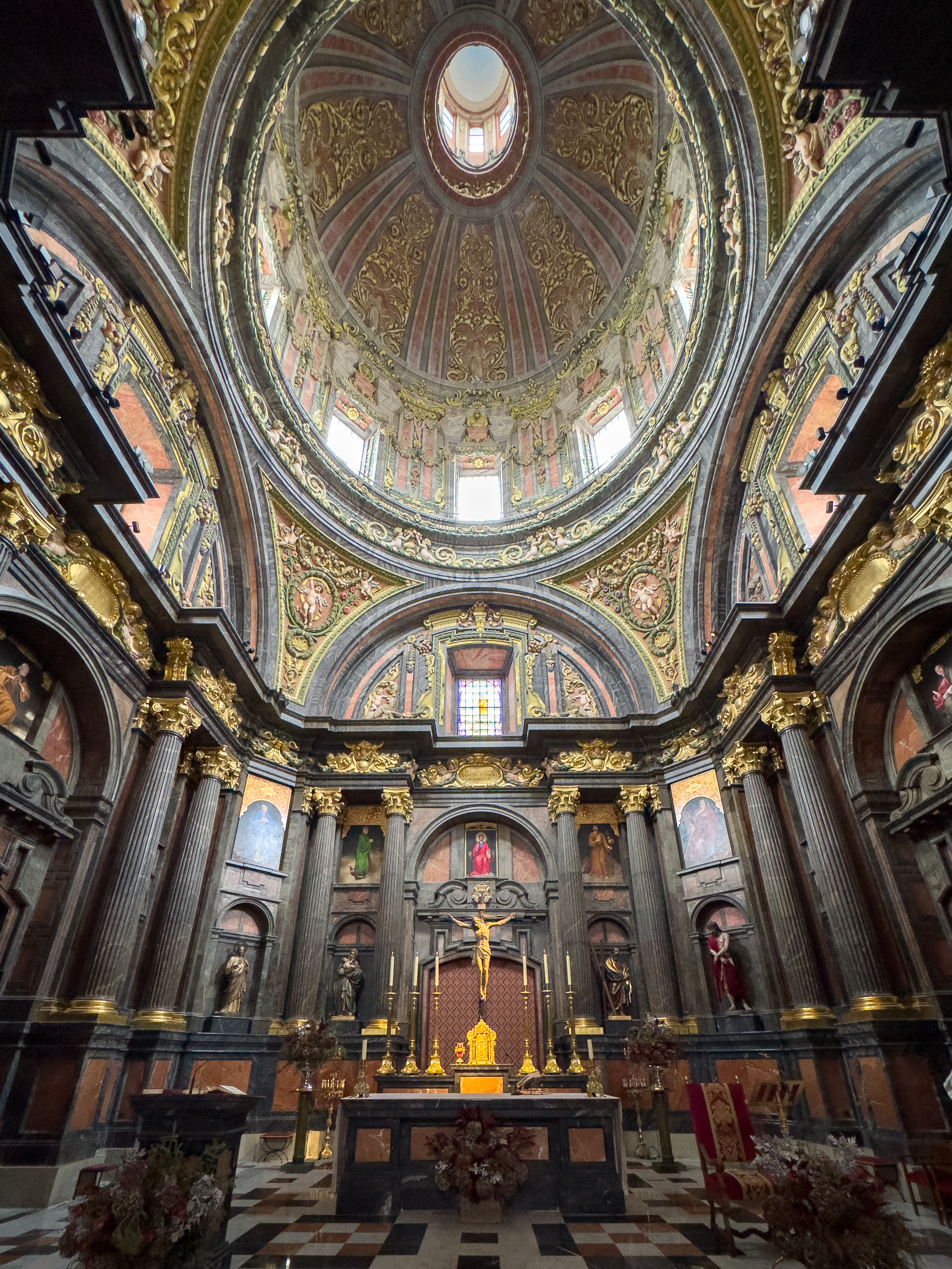

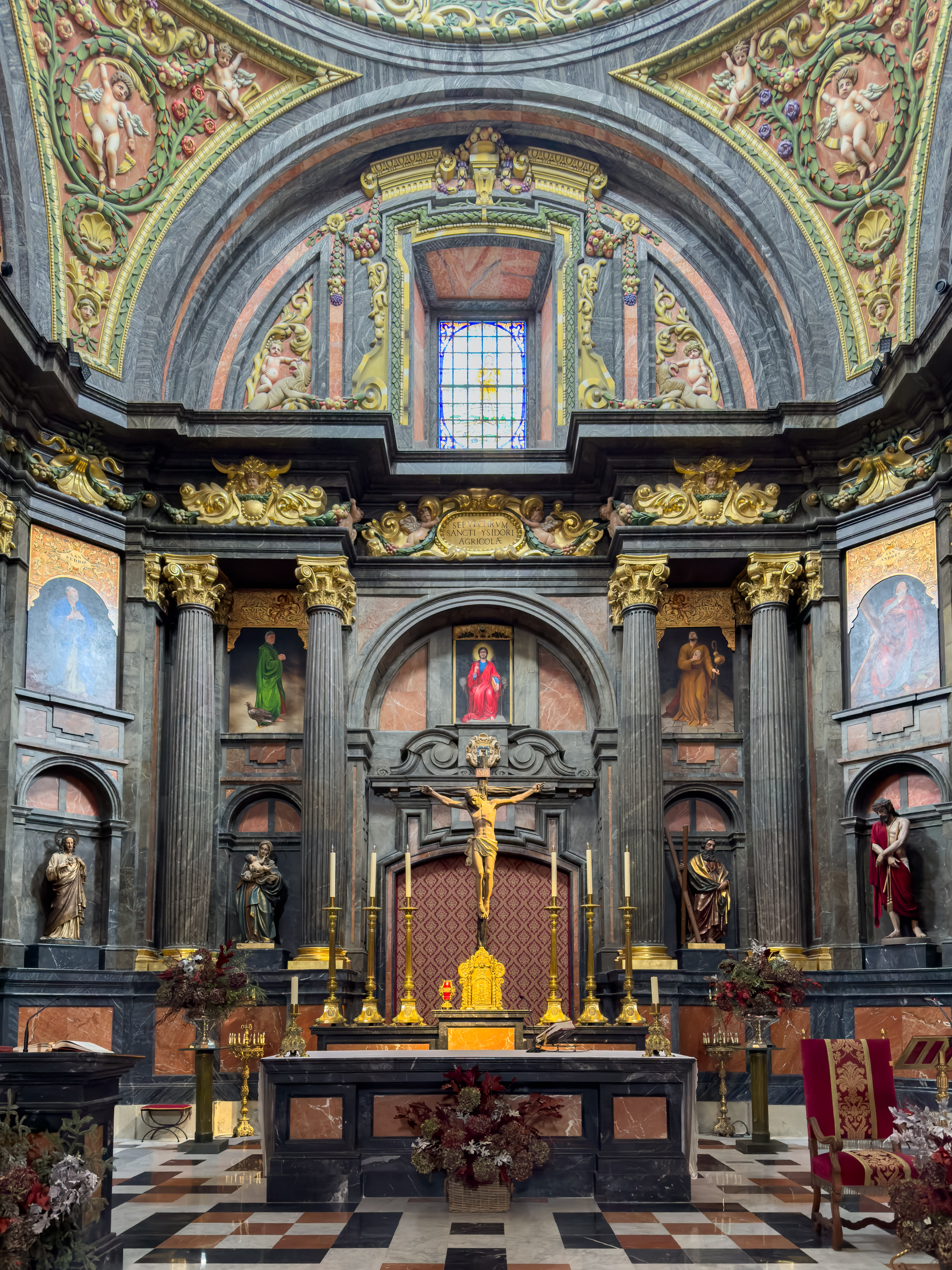

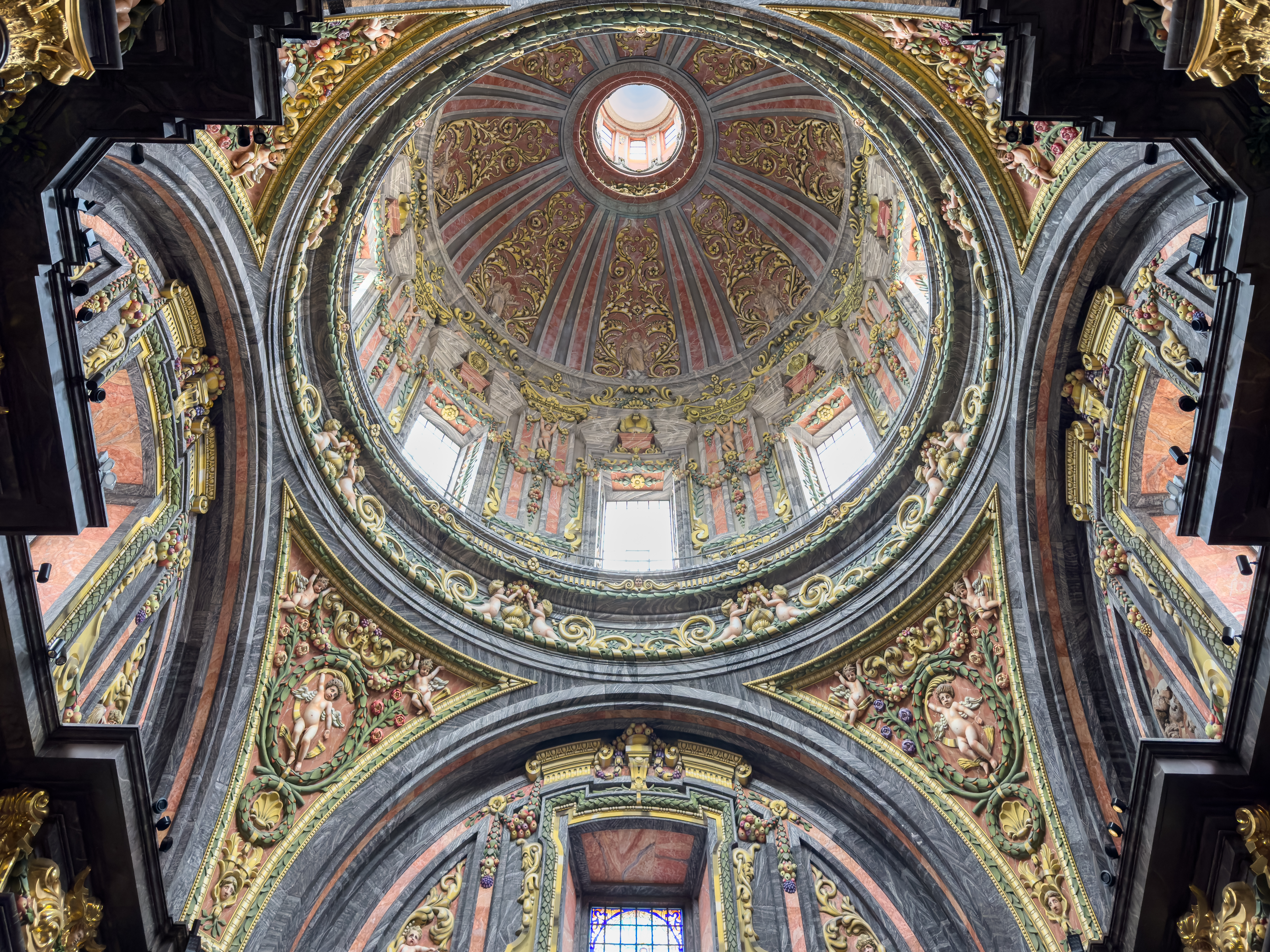

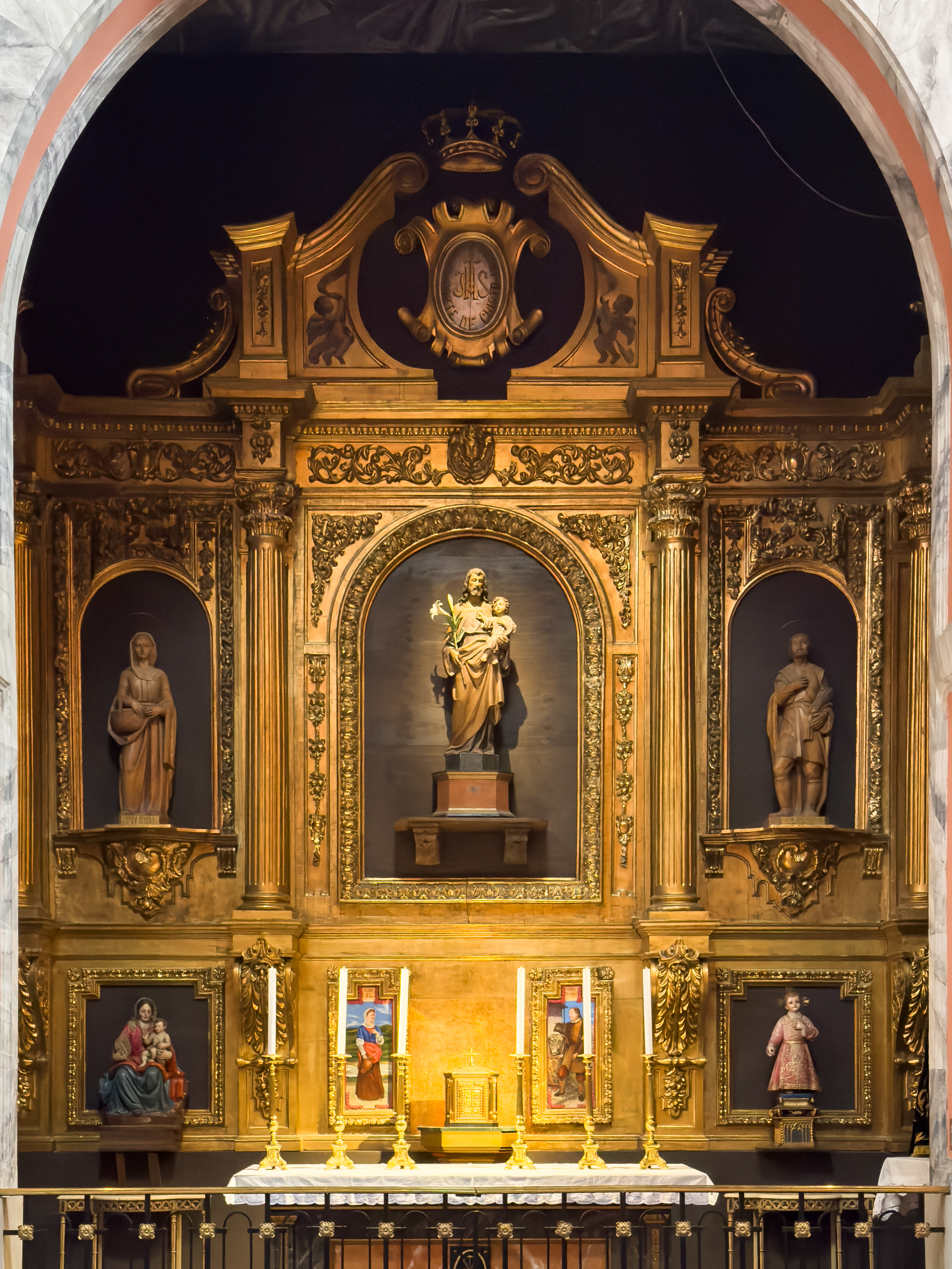

== See also ==
- Catholic Church in Spain
- List of oldest church buildings
- Romanesque churches in Madrid
