= Diet of Mainz =

The term Diet of Mainz may refer to any medieval Hoftag (high day) or early modern Reichstag (imperial diet) held in the city of Mainz. The following is an incomplete list of such diets by year and emperor:

- 1098, Henry IV
- 1119, Henry V
- 1184, Frederick I
- 1188, Frederick I
- 1235, Frederick II
- 1439, Frederick III
- 1441, Frederick III
