= Angelina of Greece =

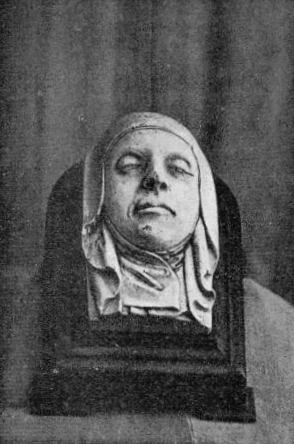
Head from the Angelina's sepulchre (1913 photograph).

Angelina of Greece (c. 1380 - Segovia, c. 1440) was a woman of Balkan origin who later established herself in Segovia, Castile (now, Spain).

== Origin ==
The traditional historiography goes, in accordance with the inscription on her tomb, that Angelina was the daughter of a Count 'Juan' (i.e. Ioannes, John, János, Ivan, etc.), and the illegitimate granddaughter of a certain king of Hungary, probably Andrew, Duke of Calabria, the titular king of Hungary. (Note: The sepulchral inscription was: AQUI YACE DOÑA ANGELINA DE GRECIA, HIJA DEL CONDE JUAN, NIETA DEL REY DE UNGRÍA, MUGER DE DIEGO GONZÁLEZ DE CONTRERAS, REGIDOR DESTA CIUDAD) Later, it was speculated that she was an illegitimate descendant of Louis I of Hungary by way of an illegitimate son, which would be Count Juan.

At present it has been proposed that she was a girl of Greco-Serbian origin, a daughter of John Uroš, count of Thessaly and titular Emperor of the Serbs, Greeks, and Bulgarians. This affiliation would likely be the one that explains her being known in Spain under the surname de Grecia (of or from Greece). In the case of the name Angelina, by which she was known in Spain, a Byzantine affiliation has been noted.

== Biography ==
Judging by the dates of her marriage, she is considered to have been born around 1380. She likely had at least one sister, Maria, who accompanied her to Spain, as did a certain Catalina.

Regarding the story how she came to end up in an Ottoman harem, it has been speculated that she was taken by Murad I after the capture of Thessalonica in 1387, or that she was demanded as tribute by his son Bayezid I after defeating Thessalonica in 1391. Later she would be captured by Timur (Tamerlane) in 1402, after the Ottoman defeat in Battle of Ankara. Around 1402 the first embassy sent by Henry III of Castile and consisting of Payo González de Sotomayor and Hernán Sánchez de Palazuelos arrived at the court of Tamerlán. At the moment after the return of the ambassadors, Tamerlán sent Angelina and her sister María to the Castilian king, along with another Christian woman, Catalina.

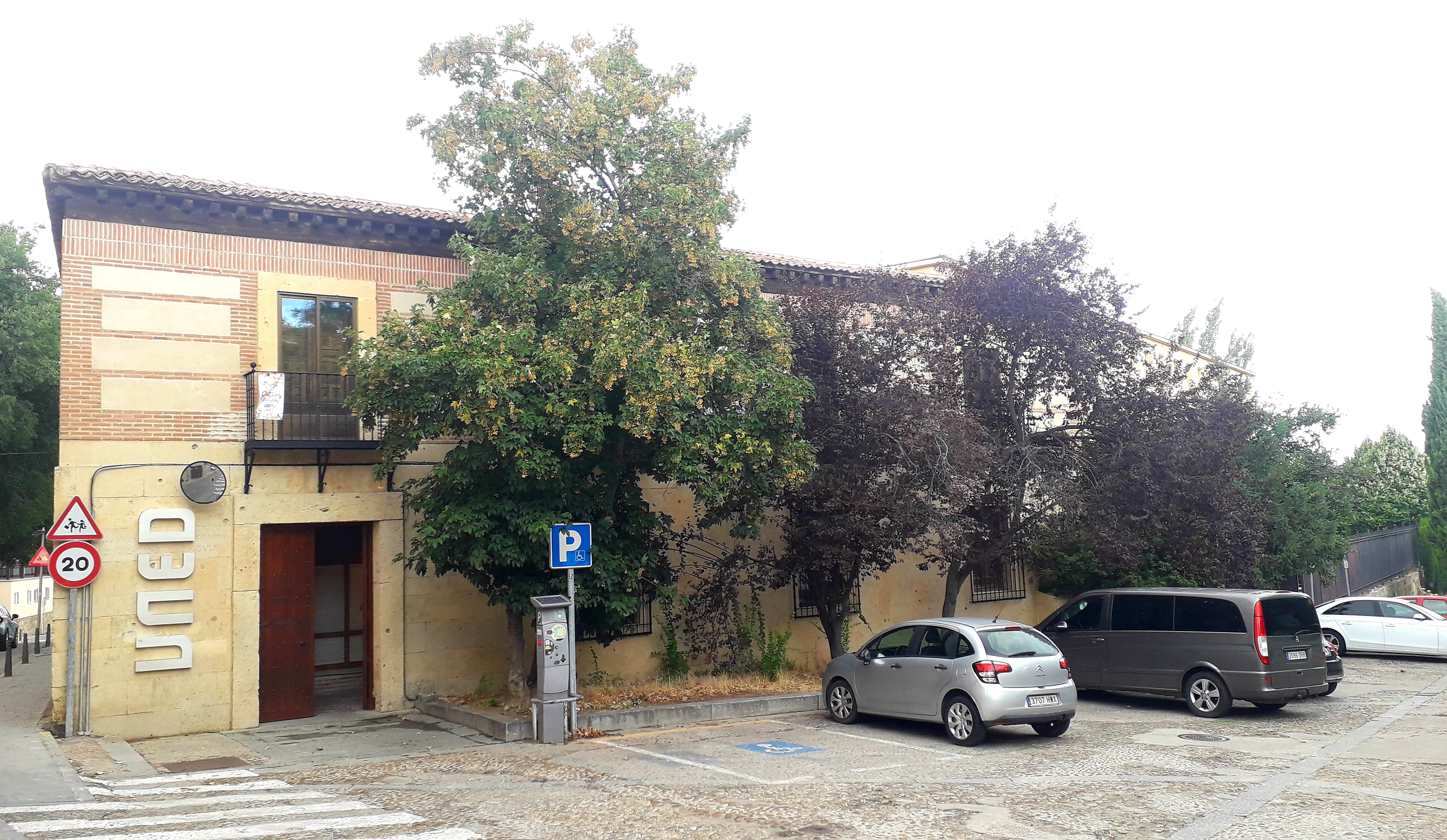
The house of the Contreras in Segovia is now the town's UNED site.

The embassy entourage arrived in Seville in 1403, whereupon the poet Francisco Imperial composed a poem dedicated to Angelina. Later, after passing through Jódar, a possession of Luis de Sotomayor, brother of the ambassador Payo González de Sotomayor, they arrived at the Alcázar of Segovia, where they met Henry III and his court. The king took them under his protection, arranging the marriage of Angelina with the Segovian nobleman Diego González de Contreras. Her sister Maria married the ambassador Payo González de Sotomayor, after having been exiled away to his holdings in Galicia, and later going to France, because the king considered that such romantic involvement was inappropriate for those entrusted with the protection of the ladies during their return trip. Catalina is said to have married Hernán Sánchez de Palazuelos. The married Angelina and Diego moved to live in Segovia, specifically in a house which is still preserved today located in the neighborhood of San Juan de los Caballeros. (Note: At present, his house houses the National Distance Education University in Segovia.)

She was initially buried in the main chapel of the Convent of Santa Cruz de Segovia. Later, when the convent of Santa Cruz passed under the patronage of the Catholic Monarchs, her remains were transferred to the Church of San Juan de los Caballeros in the same city.

Her descendants include her biographer, Juan de Contreras y López de Ayala, Marquis of Lozoya, academic and historian.

== Marriage and descendants ==
From her marriage to Diego González de Contreras several children were born, including:

- Isabel González de Contreras who married Ruy Vázquez de Tordesillas.

Additionally, it has traditionally been speculated that the following were also resultant children of the marriage:

- Fernán González de Contreras.
- John of Segovia, theologian.
