= Real Cortijo de San Isidro =

Coordinates: 40.0550°N 3.5656°W

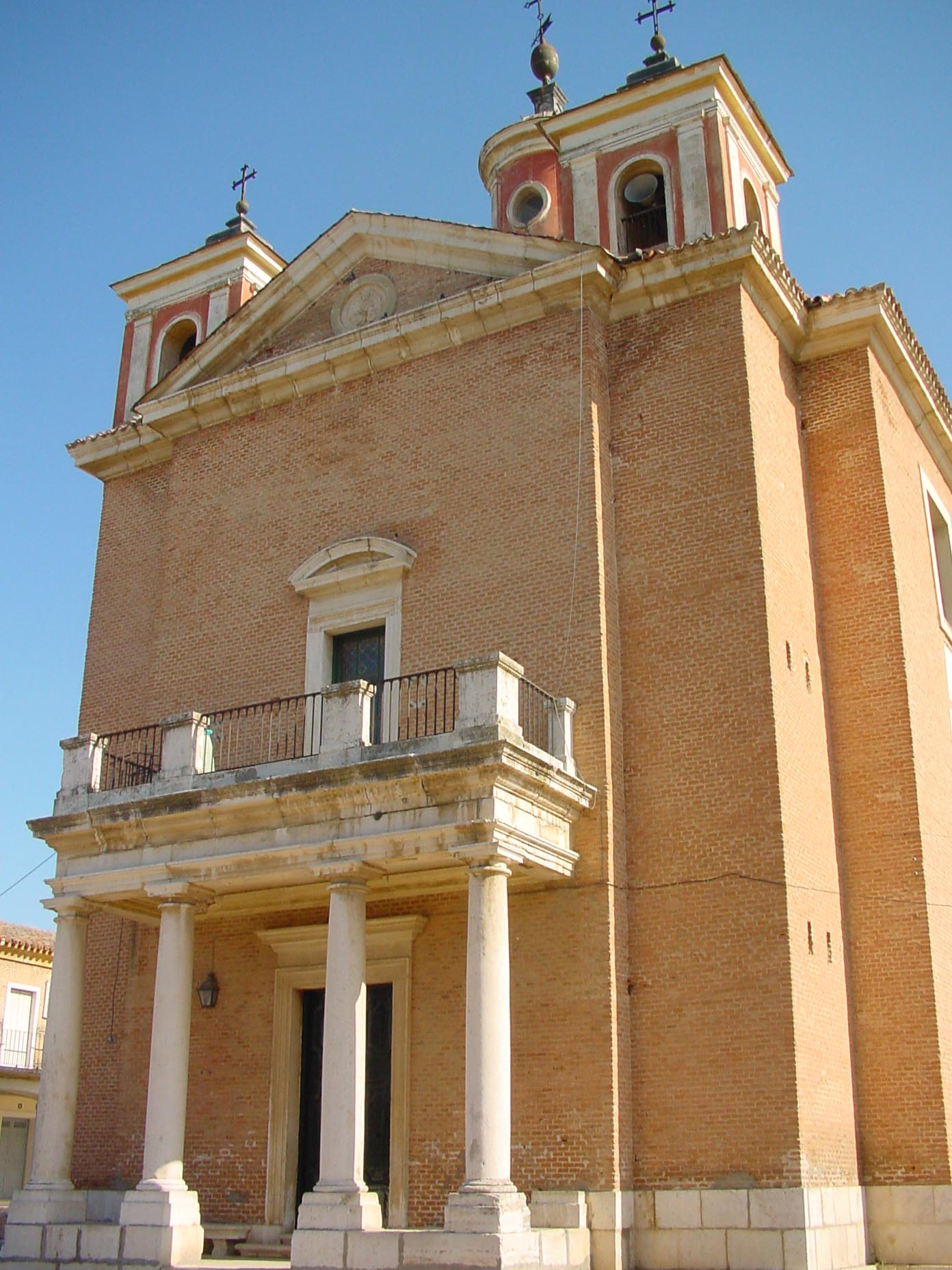
Hermitage of San Isidro at Real Cortijo de San Isidro.

The Real Cortijo de San Isidro is a village that is administratively part of the municipality of Aranjuez within the Community of Madrid, Spain. As the name of the village implies, it was a royal agricultural estate and it retains a winery complete with wine-cellar which unusually was built with royal patronage.

It has a voluntary, but official, village council known as 'una entidad local menor' that presides over an area of 1126 hectares. The Spanish State Statistical Survey of 2013 found 296 male and 306 female residents.

== Etymology ==
The settlement was named after San Isidro the farm-worker, the patron saint of farmers.

== History ==
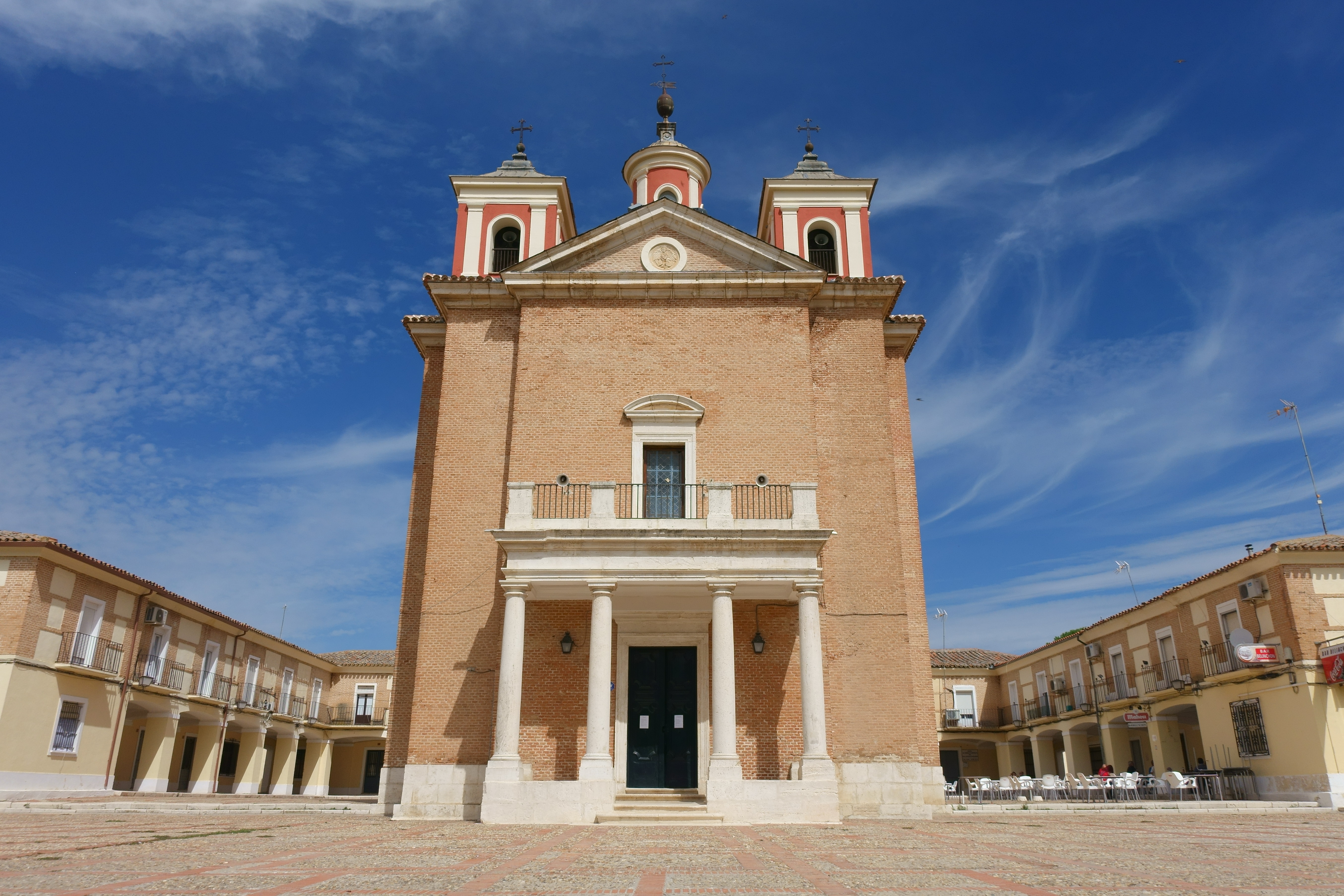
Hermitage (church) in the central plaza

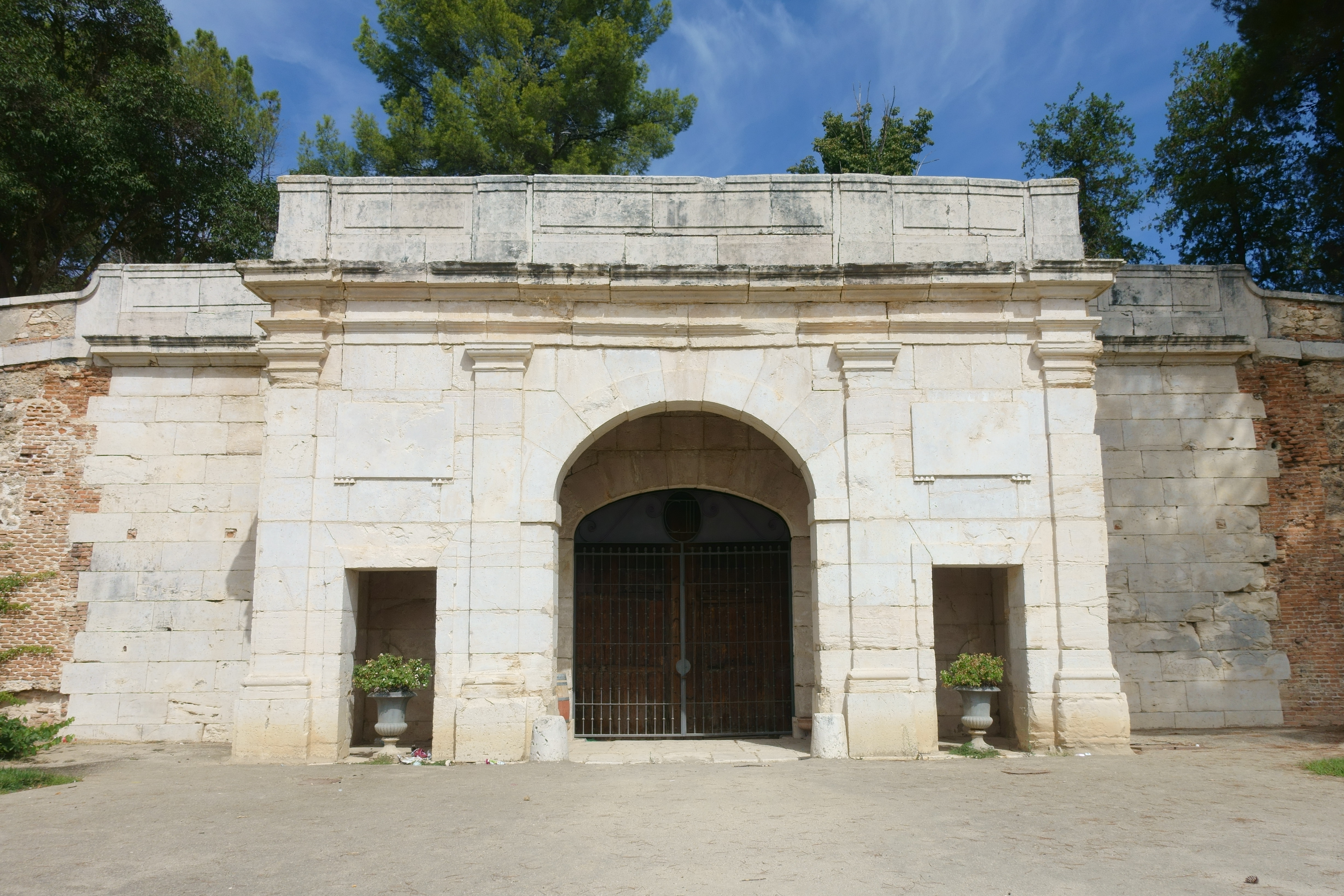
Entrance to the royal winery

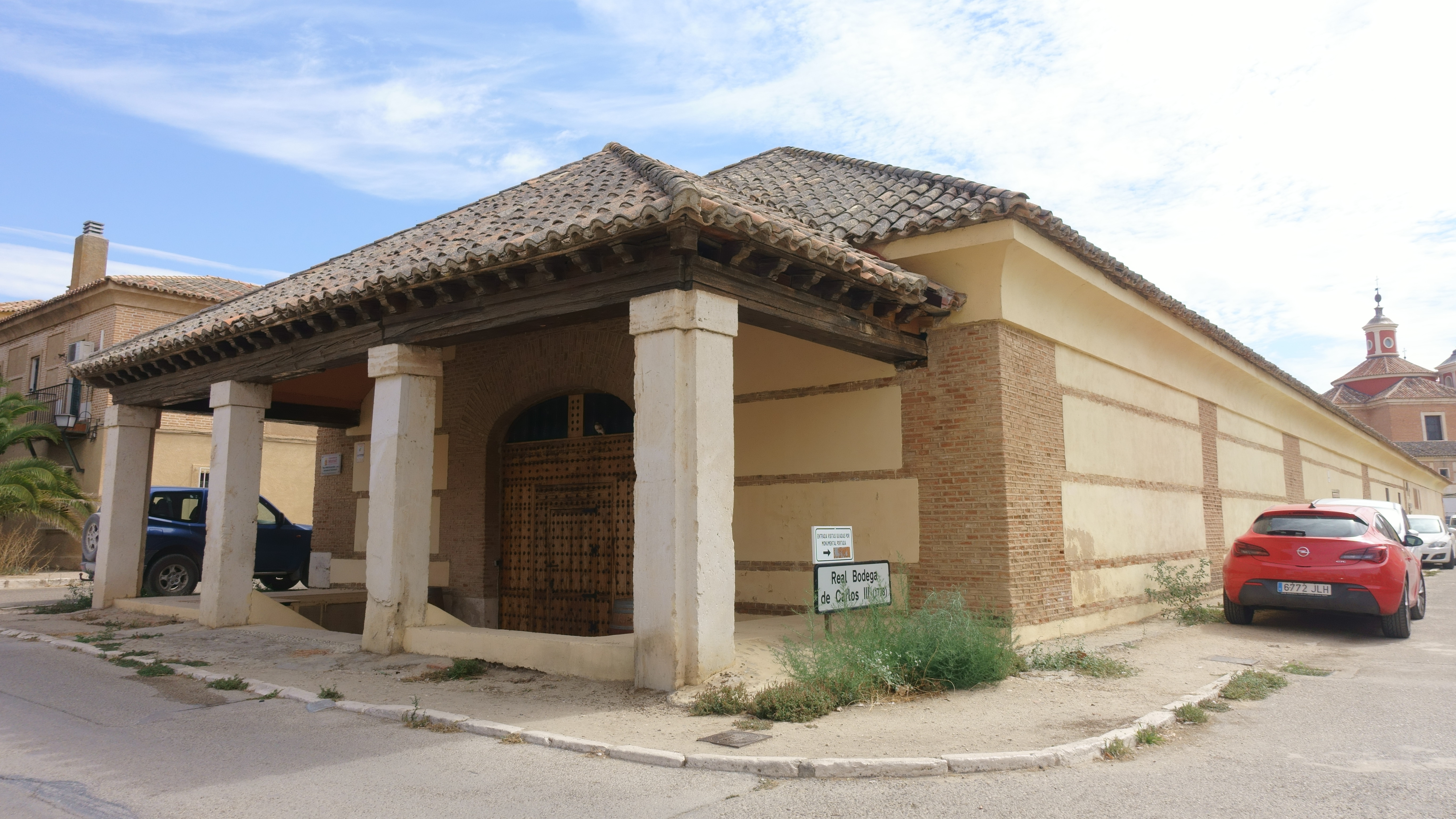
Wine store

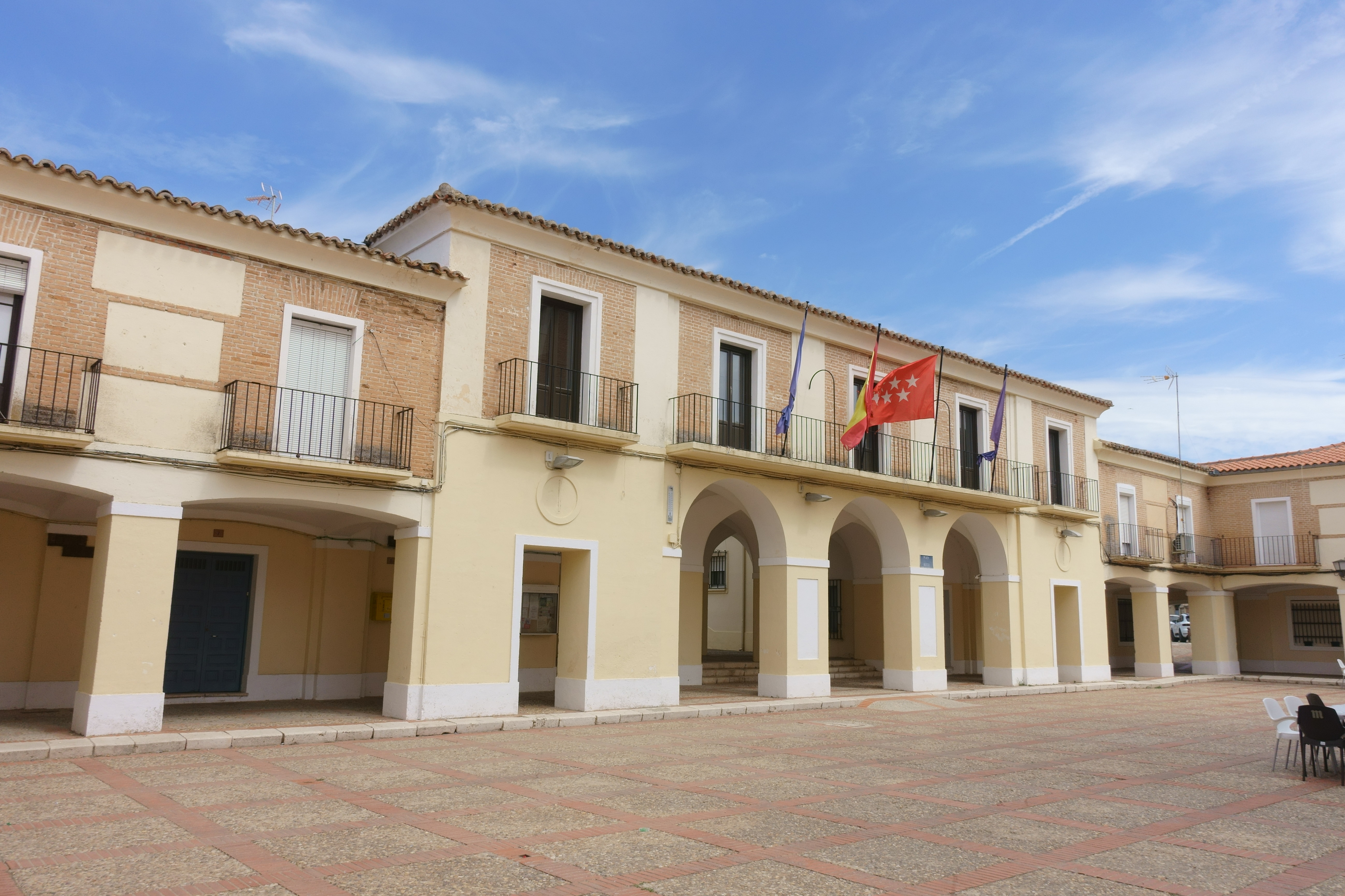
Portico of the main plaza)

Real Cortijo is notable because it was built as an experimental agricultural station in 1766 during the Enlightenment, which was inspired by King Carlos III, an enthusiastic physiocrat who was persuaded that the value of his kingdom lay more in its lands and people than in the gold and silver stored in its treasury.

After the death of Carlos III, the Cortijo fell into decay, as his son, Carlos IV, showed little interest in agriculture. In 1868, during the reign of Isabel II, the farm was sold off.

In 1944, after the civil war, the Spanish National Institute of Colonization sequestered the land. Previous owners and new settlers from various other provinces became tenants. The existing residential area was extended by the addition of newly built homes.

In the 1950s local land and houses were sold to individuals. A royal decree of September 1957 formally established the local council as a legal entity. On 15 May, the saints-day of the patron San Isidro, a festival is celebrated which traditionally includes a lively sale of local farm and market-garden produce.

== Facilities ==
It possesses a great house La Casa Grande, a winery known as La Real Bodega de Carlos III, and an associated wine cellar, La Cueva. In 1788, the year in which Carlos III died, a neo-classical Church, La Ermita del Real Cortijo de San Isidro en Aranjuez, was added.
