= Chapel of the Bishop, Madrid =

The Bishop's Chapel
- Capilla del Obispo de Madrid (Spanish)
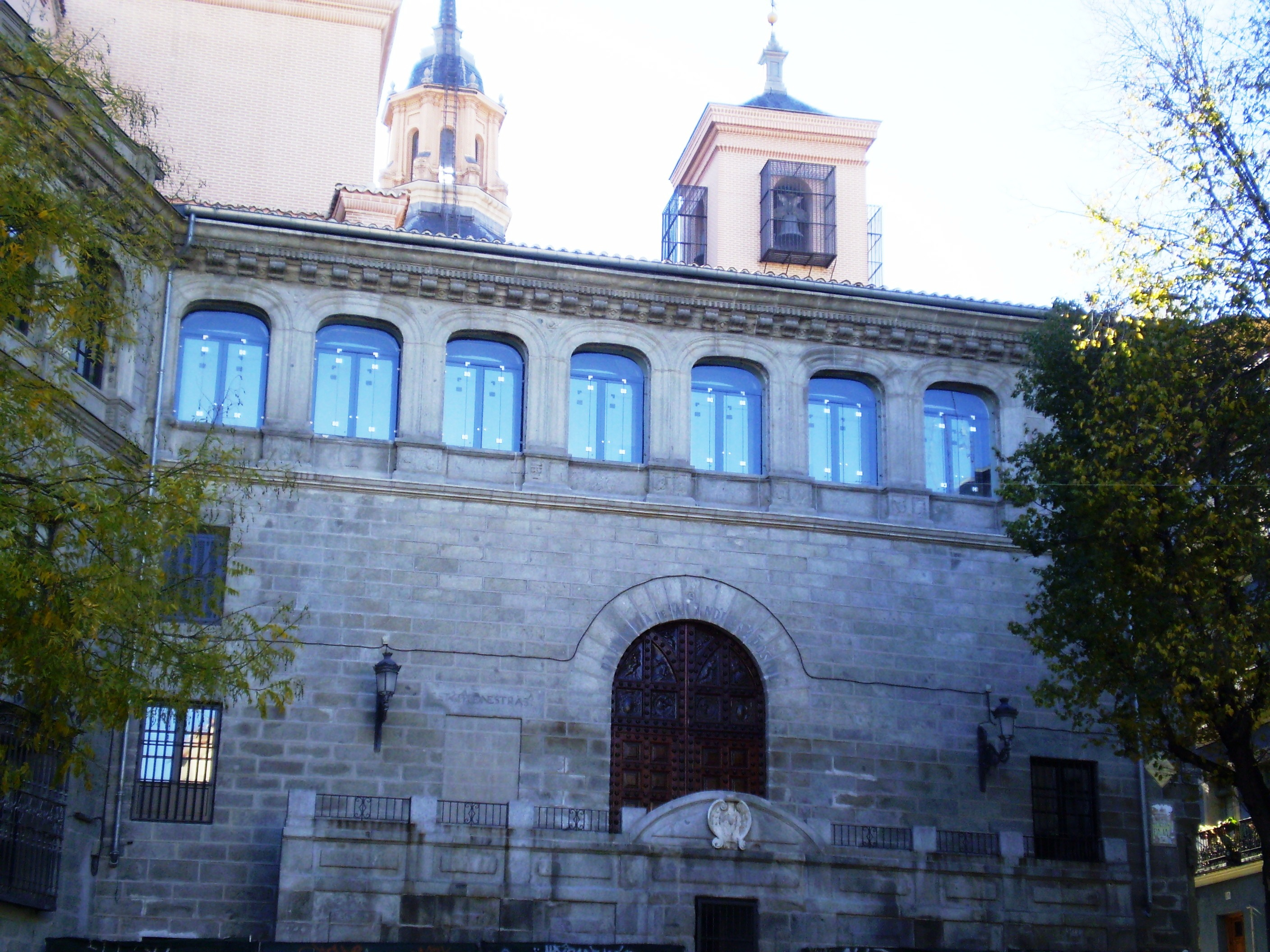

- Location within Spain
- 40.412533°N 3.711631°W
- Location: Madrid, Spain

Site notes
- Architectural styles: Gothic, Renaissance

Spanish Cultural Heritage
- Official name: Capilla del Obispo de Madrid
- Type: Non-movable
- Criteria: Monument
- Designated: 1931
- Reference no.: RI-51-0000719

The Bishop's Chapel (Spanish: Capilla del Obispo de Madrid) is a chapel, located in Madrid, Spain, which was built in the 16th century. It is named after Gutierre de Vargas Carvajal, Bishop of Plasencia, who is buried there.

The chapel is adjacent to the Church of San Andrés and was intended to hold the remains of San Isidro, patron saint of Madrid, who was initially buried at this site. When the saint's body was discovered in the late 13th century, two centuries after his death, King Alfonso XI ordered the construction in San Andres of an ark to hold his remains and a chapel in which to venerate his memory. In the 18th century, San Isidro's remains were relocated to the Basílica de Nuestra Señora del Buen Consejo.

== Conservation ==
It was given a heritage listing in 1931 and is protected as a Bien de Interés Cultural.
