= San Isidro, Madrid =

Church in Madrid, Spain

Coordinates: 40°24′46″N 3°42′25″W

St. Isidore's Collegiate Church
- Colegiata de San Isidro el Real
- Real Basílica Colegiata de San Isidro
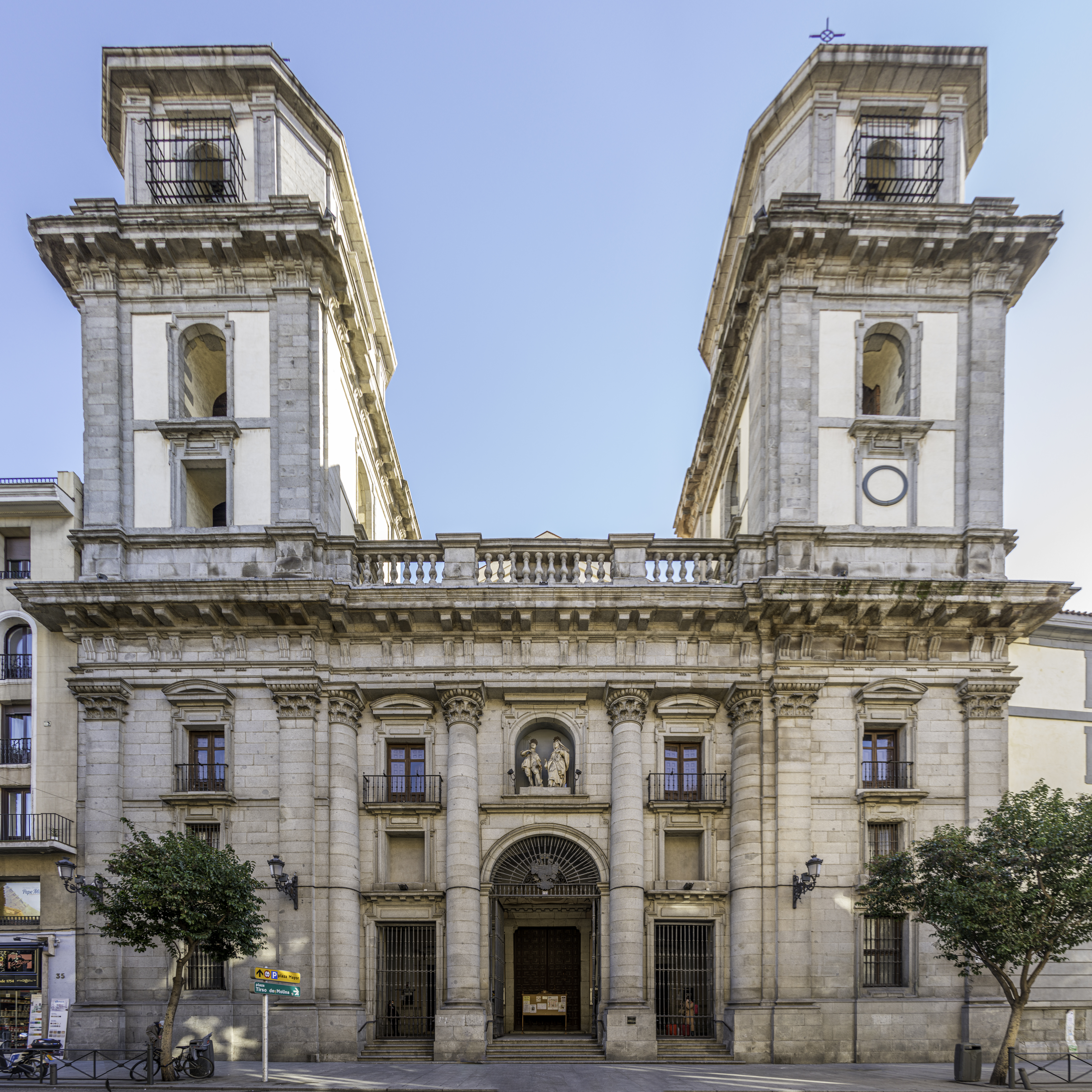
- Façade and twin belfries
- St. Isidore's Collegiate Church
- Location: Madrid
- Address: Calle de Toledo, 37
- Country: Spain
- Denomination: Catholic Church

History
- Status: Minor basilica
- Dedication: Isidore the Laborer
- Consecrated: 23 September 1651

Architecture
- Style: Spanish Baroque

Administration
- Archdiocese: Madrid

St. Isidore's Collegiate Church (Spanish: Real Basílica Colegiata de San Isidro), or simply referred to as the Colegiata, is a Baroque Catholic church in central Madrid, Spain. It is named after and holds the relics of Saint Isidore, who is patron of Madrid, as well as his wife, Santa María de la Cabeza. It has held the status of a minor basilica for centuries.

== History ==
The building replaced the 16th century parish church of Saints Peter and Paul, which had been demolished to make way for the Imperial College as per the will of Maria of Austria, empress consort of Holy Roman Emperor Maximilian II. The Holy Roman Empress had instructed her fortune be left to the Society of Jesus, for a new building to be constructed on the site.

It was designed by architect Pedro Sánchez in 1620, and work began two years later under the architect until his death in 1633. Francisco Bautista and Melchor de Bueras continued the project, finishing the church in 1664. It had been consecrated on 23 September 1651, 13 years before its completion. Associated with the Jesuits and initially dedicated to Saint Francis Xavier (an early and prominent Jesuit who is patron saint of Catholic missions), it became a collegiate church in 1767 after the Society’s expulsion.

Two years later in 1769, the church was rededicated to Saint Isidore to mark the translation of the saint's relics from the Church of Saint Andrew. As Madrid’s patron, his remains had been kept since the 16th century in the Bishop's Chapel at Saint Andrew's; also translated were the relics of his wife, Saint Mary of the Head. The interior was reworked by the famous architect Ventura Rodríguez, who designed a new, very decorative high altar and chancel.

With the canonical erection of the Roman Catholic Archdiocese of Madrid, the church was elevated to pro-cathedral in 1885. It held that rank until the 1993 completion of the present Almudena Cathedral, at which point San Isidro was returned to collegiate status. Until then, the church also housed the Holy Christ of the Good Death, along with images the Blessed Virgin Mary, and Saint Isidore – works by Juan de Mesa.

In 1936, at the outbreak of the Spanish Civil War, the building caught fire, causing the dome to collapse and destroying many works of art including the Rodríguez high altar, as well as paintings by Luca Giordano Ricci.

After the War, the church was painstakingly restored over two decades, with workers attempting to recreate its original features, such as a faithful replica of the Rodríguez high altar. The project culminated in the 1960s with the rise of a new section on the façade towers by architect Javier Barroso.

Restoration of the chapel to the Our Lady of Mount Carmel (known as "Our Lady of the Sailors Chapel") was paid for by the British Embassy in Madrid; the Coat-of-Arms of the United Kingdom can be clearly seen above the altar.

== See also ==
- Catholic Church in Spain
- List of Jesuit sites
- List of oldest church buildings

== Sources ==
- Brief description
