= Feast of Saint Isidore the Laborer =

Liturgical commemorations of the Patron Saint of Peasants

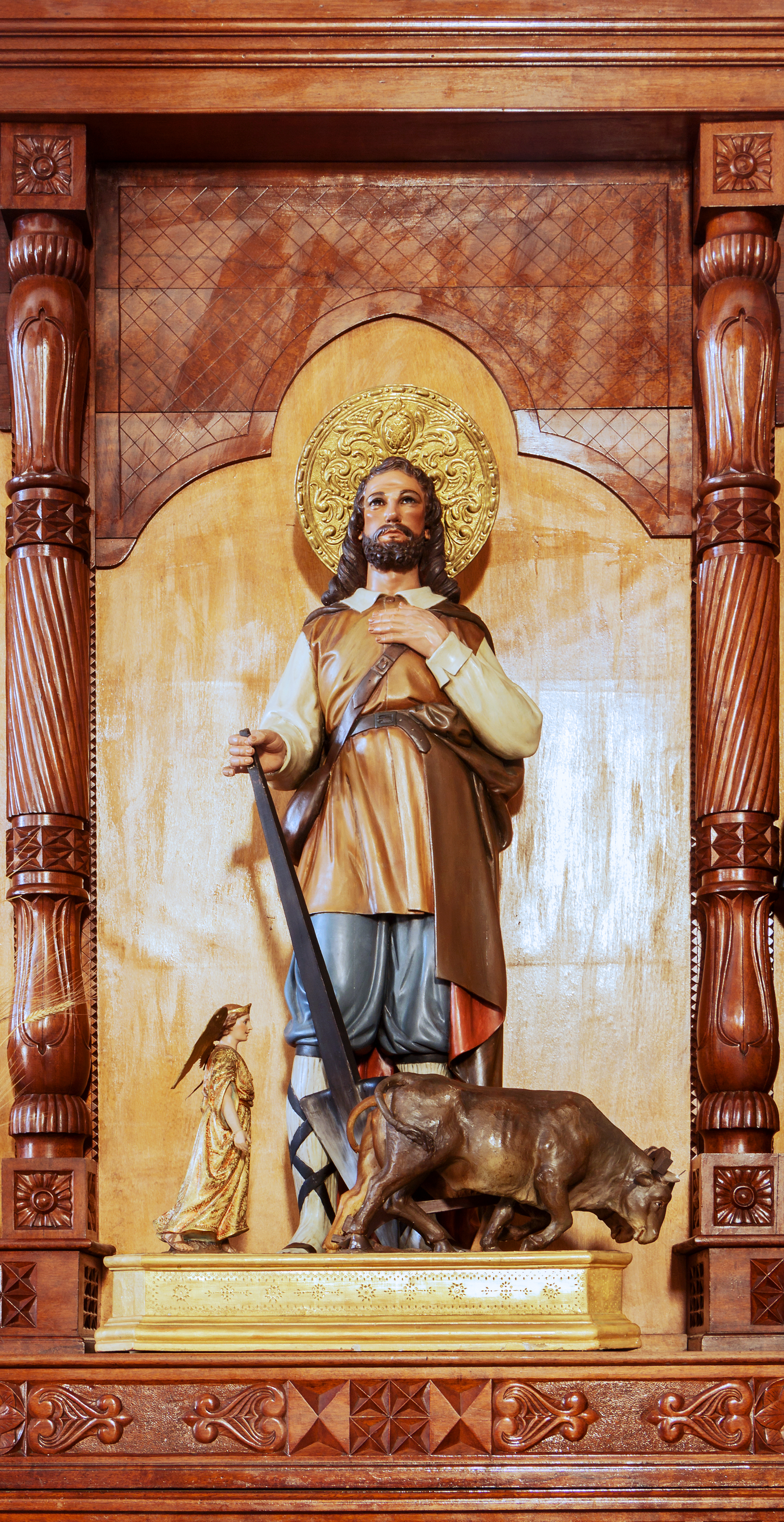
- Statue of Saint Isidore the Laborer at the Church of San Bartolomé de Tirajana in the Gran Canaria.
- Official name: Fiestas de San Isidro Labrador
- Observed by: Farmers, rural communities, Madrid, Philippines, Corsica
- Type: Christian
- Celebrations: Processions, Masses, folk dances, agricultural displays
- Date: May 15
- Related to: Saint Isidore the Laborer

The Feast of Saint Isidore the Worker, known in Spanish as Fiestas de San Isidro Labrador, is an annual celebration honoring Saint Isidore the Laborer (c. 1070 – May 15, 1130), the patron saint of farmers, peasants, rural communities, and the city of Madrid, Spain. Observed primarily on May 15, his liturgical feast day, the festivities combine religious devotion with cultural traditions, reflecting Isidore's legacy as a humble farmworker renowned for his piety and miracles. The feast is celebrated in regions with historical Spanish influence, starting from Madrid, and spreading to the historical Spanish Empire including parts of the Philippines, and Corsica, each adapting the observance to local customs.

== Background ==
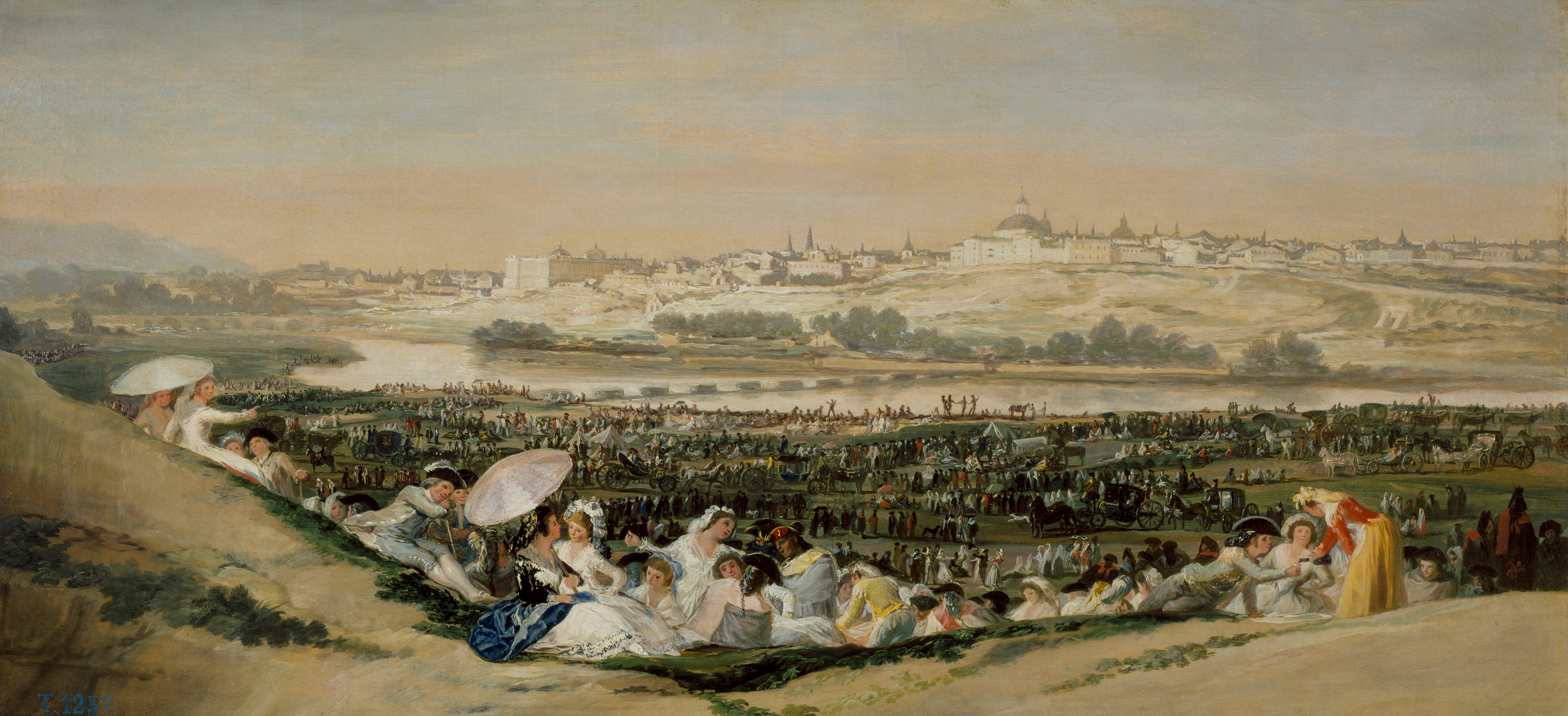
La Pradera de San Isidro by Francisco de Goya

Saint Isidore the Laborer, also known as Isidore the Farmer (Spanish: San Isidro Labrador), was a Mozarab farmworker born in Madrid around 1070 or 1082 to impoverished, devout parents. He labored on the estate of Juan de Vargas, a wealthy landowner, and was celebrated for his charity and care for animals. Over 100 miracles are attributed to him, many involving water—such as causing a spring to gush forth or raising a well's water level to save his son. His wife, María Torribia (often venerated as Santa María de la Cabeza), is also honored in some traditions. Canonized in 1622 by Pope Gregory XV, Isidore became a symbol of agricultural toil and rural life. The term "Labrador" stems from the old Spanish verb labrar ("to till" or "to work the land"), distinguishing his role as a farmer:

Vida de San Isidro Labrador, patron de Madrid by Nicolás José de la Cruz (1790)	English translation
Con un labrador vecino de este pueblo, se ajustó Isidro por criado de labranza. Hecho el concierto, comenzó a labrar las tierras de su nuevo amo.	With a farmer who lived near this town, Isidore agreed to work as a farm servant. Once the agreement was made, he began working the lands of his new master.

== History ==
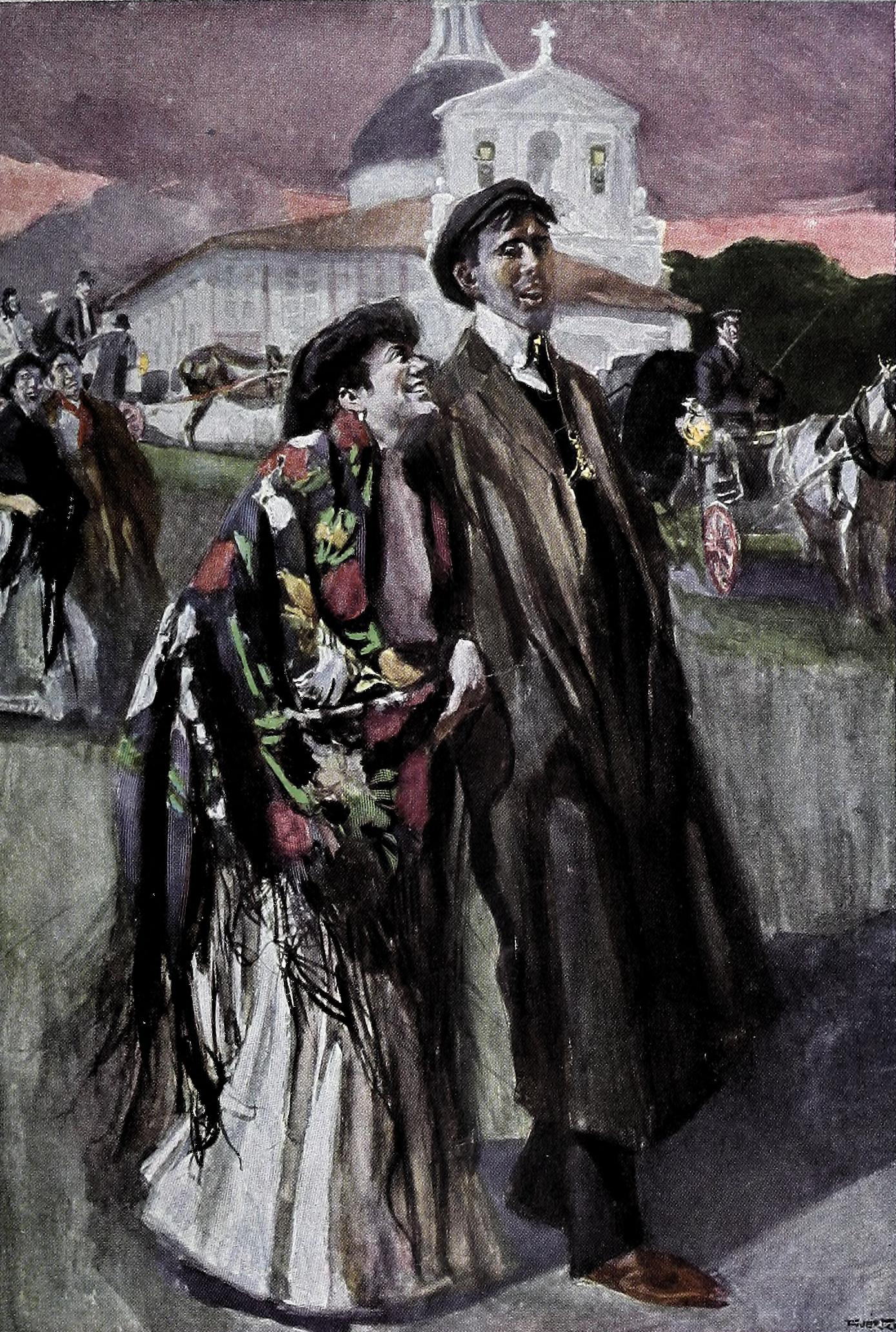
“At San Isidro” by Ángel Díaz Huertas (1906)

The origins of the Fiestas de San Isidro Labrador date to medieval Spain, following Isidore's death in 1130 centuries before his canonization. His reputation for miracles spurred early devotion, and by 1212, his body was moved to the Church of San Andrés in Madrid. The saint's body was first exhumed in April 1212 and placed in a tomb in the Church of San Andrés, where it remained until 1266. Devotion to the saint grew, and his body was occasionally taken out in processions to invoke rain. In 1520, Juan de Vargas requested papal permission to build a small chapel dedicated to the saint in the Plaza de la Paja and place his remains there. In 1528, Juan de Vargas built a hermitage dedicated to San Isidro, located outside the city; this building gave rise to the annual visits by Madrid residents. On July 14, 1619, Isidro was beatified, and the festival was set for May 15. In 1619, his beatification aligned with the opening of Madrid's Plaza Mayor during his feast, formalizing celebrations. His 1622 canonization elevated the feast's prominence. In 1692, the saint's body was placed in a wooden chest donated by Mariana de Neoburgo, the wife of Charles II. His canonization prompted a search for a new resting place, and in 1669, his remains were moved to the San Isidro Chapel. The devotion of Charles III led to the remains being transferred (for the fifth time) to the Colegio Imperial de Madrid, and just before his death, he requested that the remains of Isidro and his wife be moved to the royal chamber. Twenty years later, this hermitage was occupied by the French, during which many objects donated by royalty disappeared. After this period, Madrid residents would travel along the Cuesta de la Vega and Segovia Street to the hermitage, kissing the saint's remains and drinking from the fountain's spout. Processions seeking rain for crops became common.

In 1769, King Charles III of Spain transferred Isidore's remains to the San Isidro Collegiate Church, cementing his role as Madrid's patron. This atmosphere was captured by Goya in 1788. The writer Benito Pérez Galdós recalls in his work "May and the Isidros" that it was customary to travel to Madrid for this celebration, filling the capital with foreigners roaming the streets. Improved transportation allowed many residents from the outskirts to attend the May 15 festivities, earning these visitors the nickname "Isidros". During the 20th century, the pilgrimage was moved to the former Arganzuela Pasture and later to the Casa de Campo, but in 1941, the tradition was revived. Participants in this religious festival make exotic desserts, place them in the saint's mouth, and wait for them to disappear.

In the Philippines, the feast spread with Spanish colonization in the 16th century, resonating with agrarian communities. In Corsica, Spanish influence from the 16th–18th centuries introduced the observance to rural areas, though it remains less documented. Over centuries, the feast evolved into a mix of sacred and secular traditions.

== Observance ==
=== Madrid, Spain ===
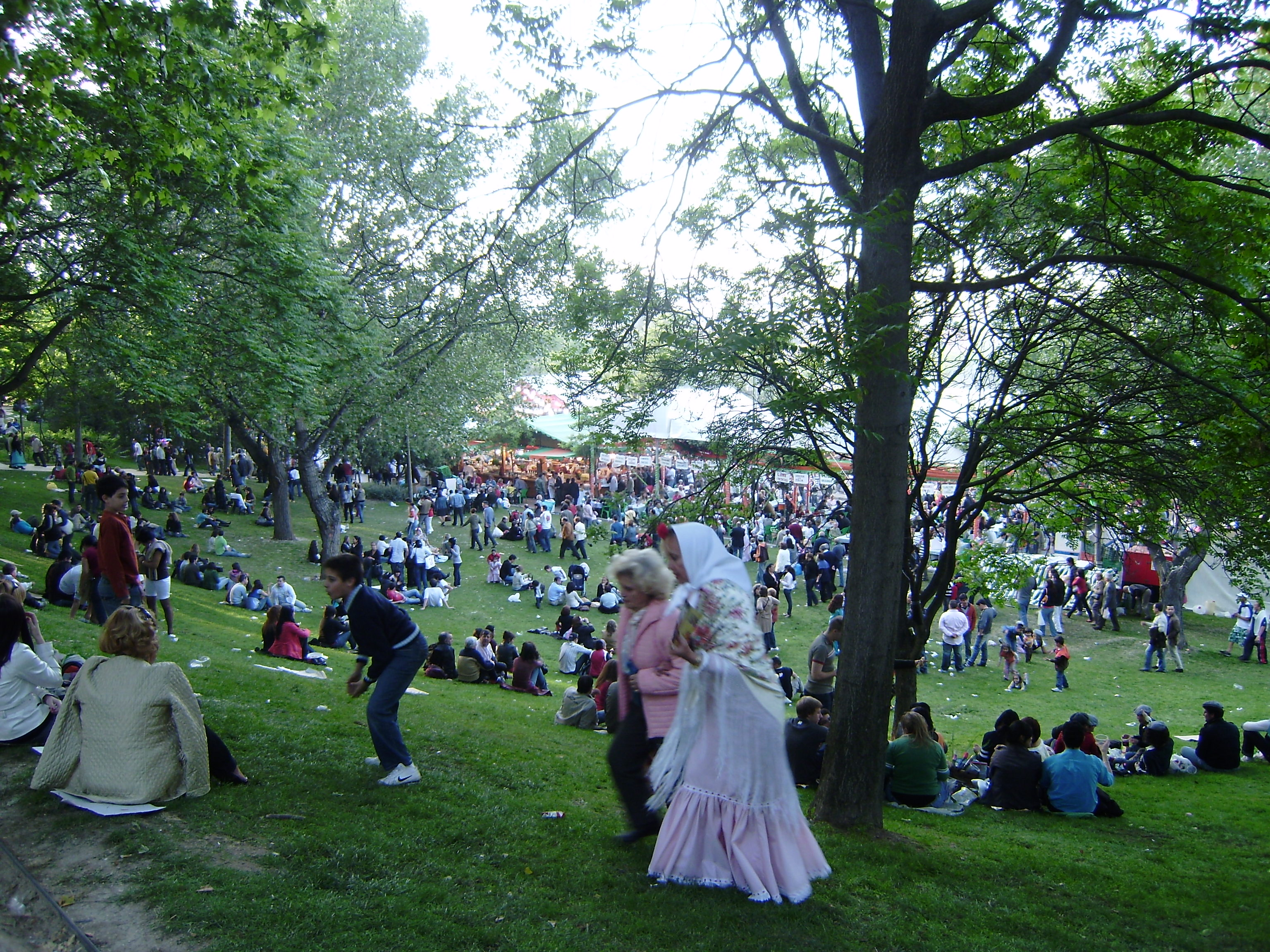
Madrid residents lunching in the meadow during the San Isidro Festivals.

In Madrid, the Fiestas de San Isidro Labrador are the city's premier festival, designated a Bien de Interés Cultural in 2021. Pilgrims visit the Hermitage of San Isidro to drink from a miraculous spring, while Masses, processions Pablo statues of Isidore and María, and the Romería outdoor service form the religious core.

Secular events include concerts, chotis dancing, and parades. Locals don chulapo and chulapa attire—men in checked caps and waistcoats, women in lace dresses and shawls. Food stalls sell rosquillas (doughnuts), tripe, and Madrid stew. The San Isidro Bullfighting Festival at Las Ventas bullring runs through May, attracting global attention.

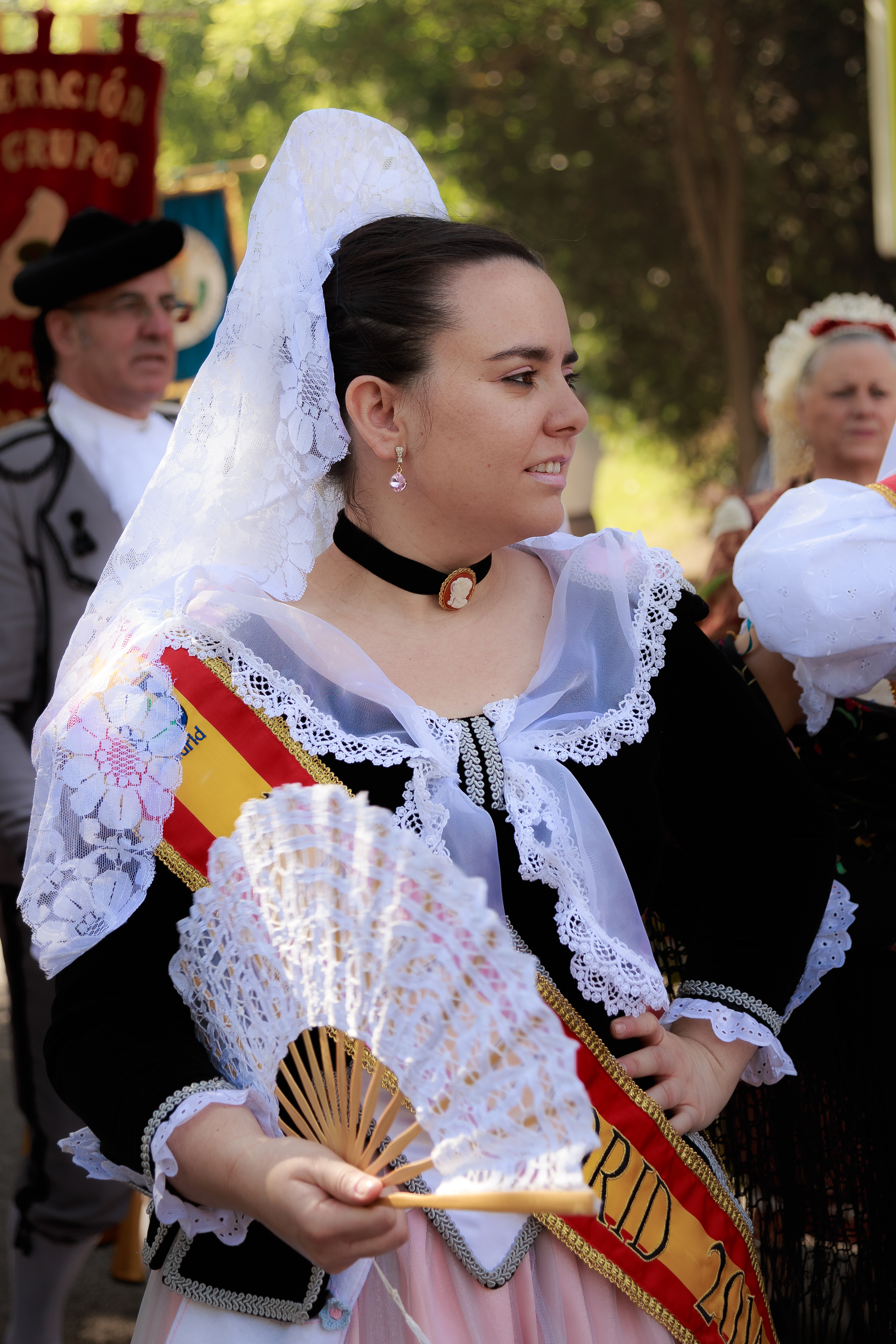
Chulapos and chulapas dancing chotis in Pradera de San Isidro, Madrid, 2014.

Today, celebrations spread throughout the city; both the City Council and private entities, such as regional associations based in Madrid, organize regional dances in the Plaza Mayor, gastronomic weeks, neighborhood verbenas, bullfighting fairs, religious events, and sports activities like regattas on the Manzanares River. Every May 15, Madrid residents gather to eat in the famous meadow and drink water from the hermitage's spout. The promenade leading to the hermitage fills with stalls offering various items from Madrid cuisine, such as fried gallinejas and entresijos, squid sandwiches, assorted pickles (banderillas, olives, Almagro eggplant), as well as wafers and dessert wines.

=== Chile ===
In Chile, in the town of Cuz Cuz, 5 kilometers from the city of Illapel, Choapa province, Coquimbo region, the feast of San Isidro is celebrated on May 15. On this occasion, because it is a Monday, it is celebrated on the first Sunday after, that is, May 21. It begins with a mass at noon, followed by a procession through the countryside in which the saint is accompanied by Chilean dances.

Also in Cuncumén, a town belonging to the commune of San Antonio, V Region, this festival is celebrated on the Sunday closest to May 15, with a pilgrimage where the image of the Saint is transported in a cart pulled by oxen to travel the streets of the town.

Likewise in the town of La Huayca, a town located a few kilometers from Pica and La Tirana, in the Tarapacá Region. It is celebrated on May 15, with the festival beginning on May 13 and ending on May 16, with religious dances, bands, and a big party for the whole town, a procession.

Also in the main courtyard of the Faculty of Agronomy and Forestry Engineering of the Pontifical Catholic University of Chile, there is an image of San Isidro Labrador, patron of the school. This image was inaugurated on May 22, 2008, by the Cardinal Archbishop of Santiago, Monsignor Francisco Javier Errázuriz Ossa. Every year the Faculty celebrates the "Week of San Isidro" with activities for teachers, students and staff.

=== Mexico ===
In Mexico, in San Juan del Río, where there is a neighborhood called San Isidro, the festivities begin 9 days before his day with processions, rosaries and Eucharists to fulfill the novena and on the 15th the mañanitas are sung at midnight; at noon a solemn mass is sung for San Isidro Labrador and there are confirmations with the attendance of the bishop. In addition, there are dances, a parade, a fireworks display and at the end of the mass, people gather in the streets to celebrate and have a meal in honor of San Isidro.

In Xoxoclota, Veracruz, Mexico, whose name comes from Nahuatl and means "Place where there are green pines" or Xoxo "Place of old pine trees", San Isidro is the patron saint. The celebration in his honour begins on 14 May with a procession from the house of the steward (the person in charge of the patron saint and who feeds the people who attend the procession and is in charge of placing flowers and decorating the church, together with his deputies, who help the steward with the expenses) to the church for the celebration of mass. After this, a castle and the bulls of fireworks or fireworks are burned and then the procession returns to the steward's house. On the 15th, another procession is held to the church to attend the midday mass that the bishop says and in which confirmations are celebrated. A procession through the town follows and later a day is chosen to take San Isidro to the river so that there is a good harvest, just as the day is chosen to hand over the new steward to the patron saint of the town for the next year.

Twenty kilometers from Ocampo, in the Municipality of Guanajuato, there is a community called San Isidro Labrador, where the celebration in honor of this patron saint is held on May 15. This festivity begins with the traditional morning songs around 6 a.m., followed by the traditional pilgrimage from the entrance of the town to the temple where the image of San Isidro lies prostrate on an altar.

This place is visited by a large number of people, mainly from the cities of Monterrey, Mexico City, Leon and San Luis Potosí. It is celebrated with traditional dances in brightly colored costumes, and the famous "passenger" dance is already a tradition, which entertains both children and adults who gather in the atrium of the parish.

Likewise, in the Municipality of San Luis Acatlán, in the State of Guerrero, the festival of San Isidro Labrador is one of the largest in the Municipality, sometimes surpassing its patron saint festival. San Isidro is undoubtedly very popular in this municipality, where the population is mostly rural.

=== Peru ===
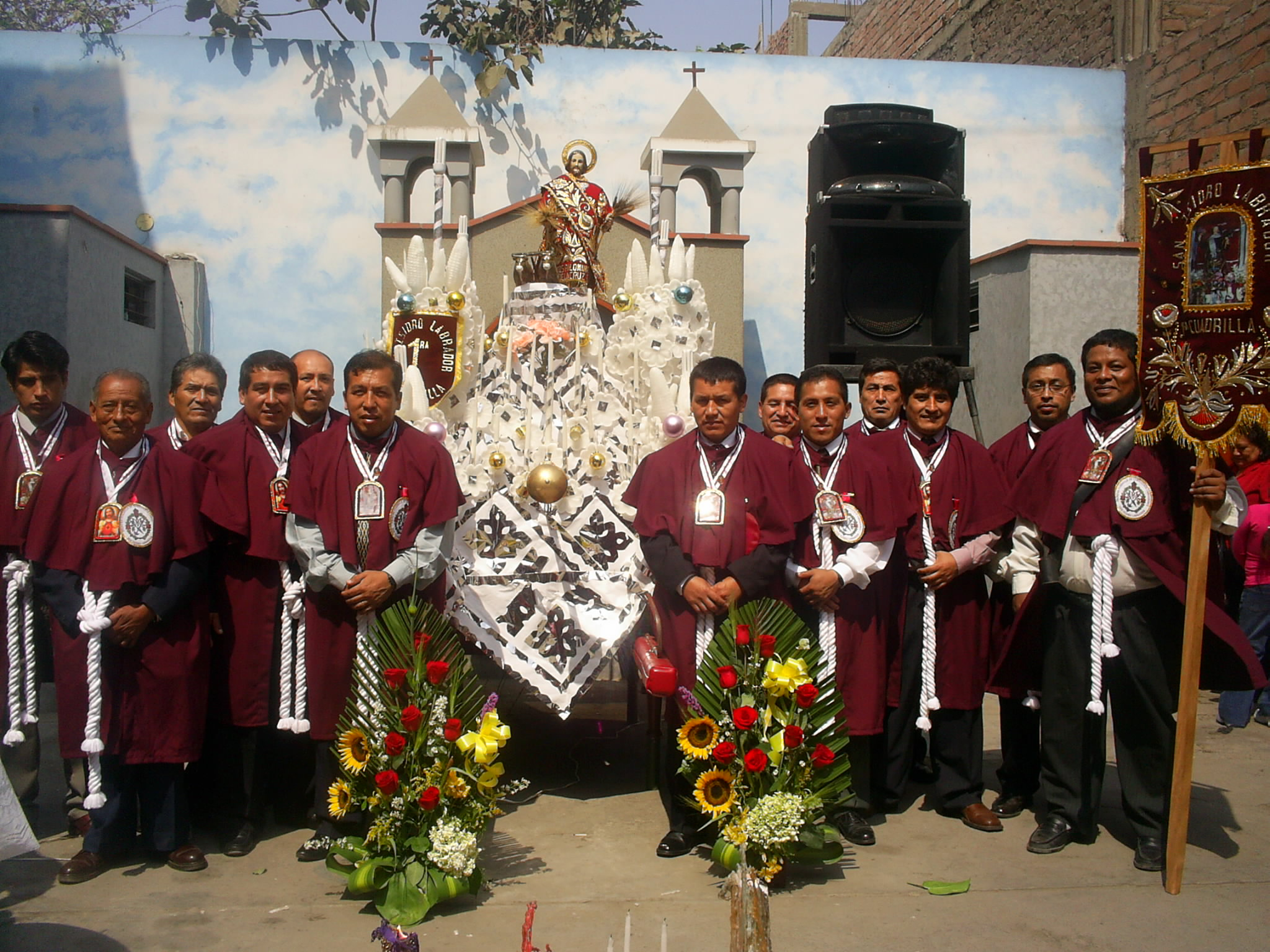
First group of our Patron Saint San Isidro Labrador, from the town of San Isidro de Carampa. Lima, Peru (2006).

In Lima, the feast of San Isidro Labrador is celebrated by the residents of the town of San Isidro de Carampa, in Ayacucho, in the city of Lima. For this, the "Sociedad Matriz de San Isidro de Carampa" organizes, together with the Steward and the Adornante, the festivities for that date. It begins on the eve with the celebration of Mass and a procession of the saint to the house of the Adornante. The saint is carried by the First Squad of Carriers of San Isidro Labrador. The following day, Central Day, another mass is also held. The procession is also held and then a party in honor of the Saint.

In the district of Moche, province of Trujillo, department of La Libertad, the festivity lasts approximately two months, traveling throughout the countryside until its triumphant arrival in the town on May 15, its central day, when a crowded procession takes place through the main streets of Moche. Accompanied by the brotherhood, a band of musicians and groups of dancing “Devils”. On a float dressed with flowers and abundant fresh fruit, San Isidro sits in his traditional attire, consisting of a straw hat, cape and a palan.

Since 2016, the festivities of San Isidro Labrador have been declared as a national cultural heritage of Peru.

=== Philippines ===
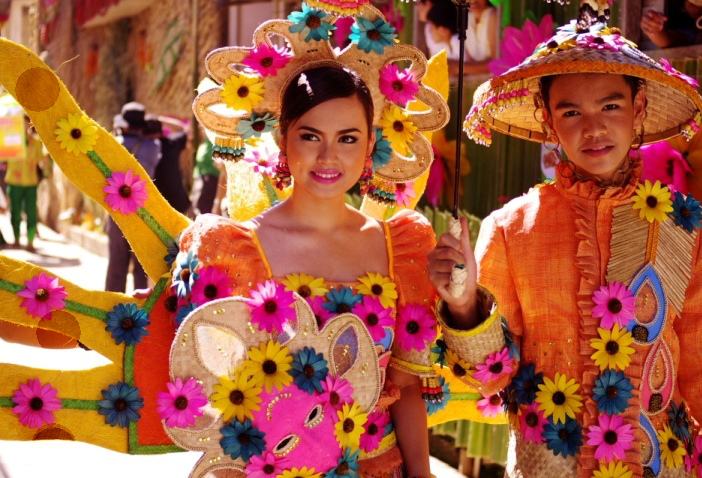
Philippines Pahiyas Festival of Lucban in Quezon.

An example of the legacy of the former Spanish Empire in the Philippines lies in the celebration of popular festivals, such as San Isidro Labrador, the patron saint of Madrid, which has effectively been Spain's capital since 1606. In the Philippines, the festivals in honor of San Isidro, particularly popular in Quezon Province, differ significantly from those in Spain. For instance, Filipinos do not dress as "chulapos" or "chulapas," as this custom emerged in Spain in the mid-19th century and did not take deep root in the Philippines. To this day, over 150 Filipino parishes honor Isidore as patron, with the feast marking gratitude for harvests. Key celebrations include:

- Pahiyas Festival in Lucban, Quezon: On May 15, homes are decorated with kiping (rice wafers) and produce. After Mass at St. Isidro Labrador Parish, processions precede feasts with pansit habhab.
- Carabao Festival in Pulilan, Bulacan: Carabaos kneel before the Church of San Isidro Labrador after a procession, followed by novenas and funfairs.
- Bariw Festival in Nabas, Aklan: From May 12–15, bariw (pandan leaf) crafts are showcased alongside agricultural displays.

=== Corsica, France ===
In Corsica, the feast is quieter, observed in rural villages influenced by Spanish rule (16th–18th centuries) but lacks the scale of Madrid or the Philippines. Farmers pray for fertile land at chapels dedicated to Isidore, such as in Balagne, followed by meals of local cheeses and wines. The Feast of Saint Isidore the Laborer, celebrated annually on May 13 and 14 in Bonifacio, Corsica, is organized by the Confrérie Sainte-Marie Madeleine and honors the patron saint of farmers. After singing the Office of Saint Isidore, the Mass is followed by a procession to the Church of St-Dominique for a wine blessing. In the afternoon, the popular feast known as Fiesta Pialinca at the Chapel of Saint Mary Magdalene—now the "House of Bonifacian Confraternities"—fosters community and conviviality. The feast was revived in 2022 after 60 years of its interruption: back in the days, Bonifacian farmers (Pialinchi) attended Mass at Ste-Marie-Majeure and blessed their donkeys before fieldwork.

== Customs ==
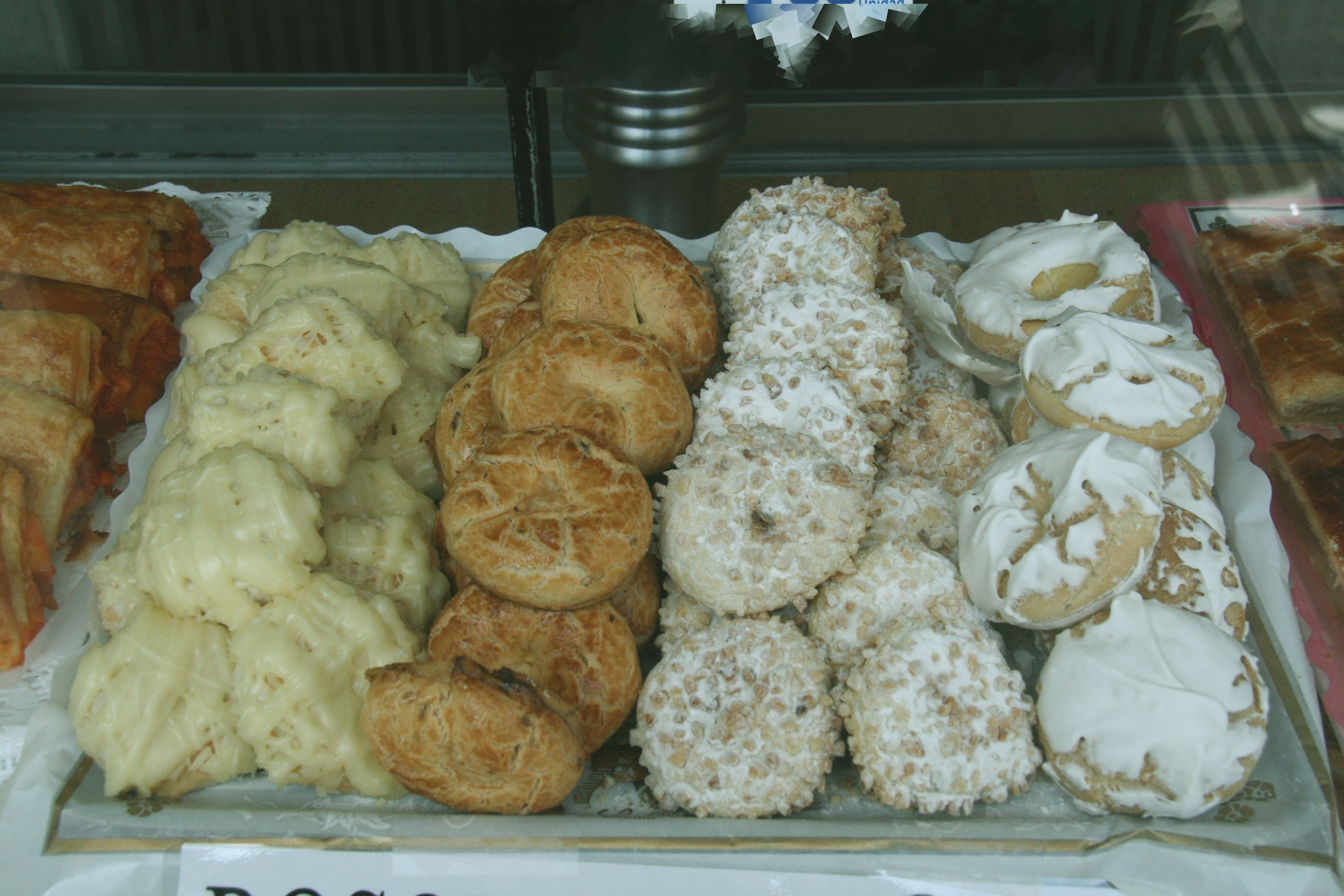
Assortment of San Isidro doughnuts.

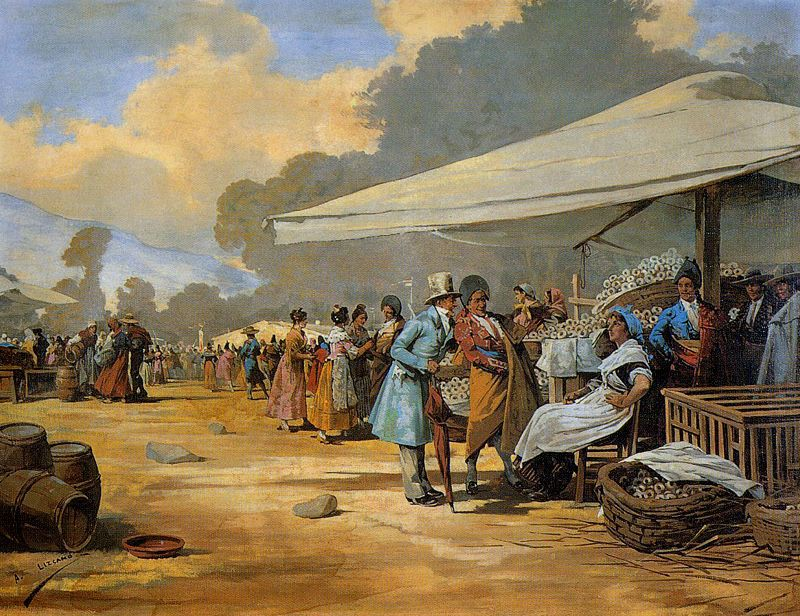
The Saint’s Doughnuts in an oil painting by Ángel Lizcano (circa 1890).

Since the 16th century, it has been customary in Madrid to picnic on the meadow's grass and use water from nearby springs. Numerous stalls in the area sold the traditional doughnuts of the saint. Among the most famous were the "tontas" ones (without coating), the "listas" ones (sugar-coated), those of Santa Clara, French ones, and the popular ones from "Aunt Javiera" and "Fuenlabrada," typically strung on a cord. Equally traditional are "torraos" (roasted nuts), candied almonds, caramel apples, pickles, and marinated foods. It was also common to buy botijos (red ones from Alcorcón or yellow ones from Ocaña), glass whistles with crystal flowers (known as Pitos del Santo). Typical drinks include “chicos” from Valdepeñas (glasses of wine), “clara con limón” (beer with lemon), and lemonade.

== Cultural Significance ==
The feast unites faith and folklore, celebrating agricultural heritage and converging with the traditions of praying for rain through rogations with Saint Isidore. In Madrid, it embodies casticismo madrileño, blending piety with festivity. In the Philippines, it reflects resilience and colonial-indigenous fusion. In Corsica, it nods to historical ties with rural simplicity. Isidore's appeal as a saint of the common people endures across these regions.

== See also ==
- Saint Isidore the Laborer
- Chotis
- Pahiyas Festival
- Las Ventas
