= Maria Torribia =

Spanish farmer and saint

Blessed Maria Toribia
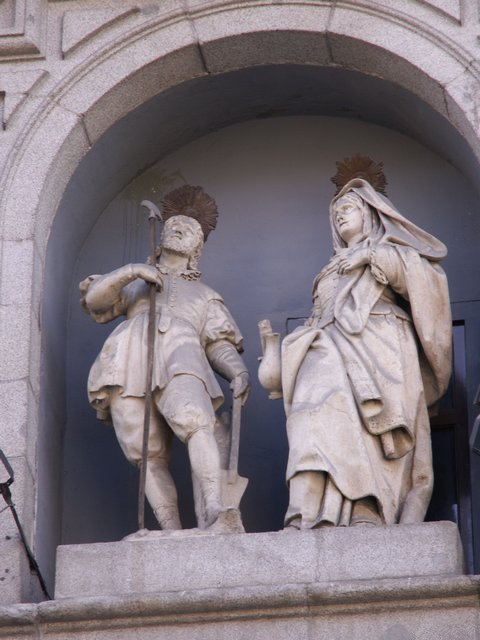
- Statues of Ss. Isidore and Maria Torribia (María de la Cabeza) on the facade of the Colegiata de San Isidro, Madrid
- Born: Unknown; Caraquiz
- Died: 1175; Torelaguna
- Venerated in: Catholic Church
- Beatified: 11 August 1697, Saint Peter's Basilica, Papal States by Pope Innocent XII
- Feast: 9 September; 15 May (with Saint Isidore)

Maria Toribia (died 1175) was a Spanish peasant woman who is believed to have married Saint Isidore. She is known in Spain as Santa María de la Cabeza ("Saint Mary of the Head").

== Life ==
Maria's date of birth is unknown, but it was sometime near the end of the 11th century or at the beginning of the 12th century. She is believed to have been born in Caraquiz, a little village close to Uceda, in the current-day Spanish province of Guadalajara. She subsequently lived in Torrelaguna, in current-day Madrid Province. There, she met and married Isidore, a simple farmer from Madrid (who, according to some sources, had fled there as a result of the Almoravid invasion), with whom she had her only son, Illan. According to legend, the child one day fell down a deep well, leaving the parents with no recourse but prayer. Miraculously, the water level suddenly rose to the level of the ground, and the floating baby was easily rescued unharmed. As a result of this, she and her husband committed themselves to sexual abstinence as a form of devotion, and, from that time on, lived in different homes. Their son later died in infancy.

One story relates that Maria always kept a pot of stew on the fireplace in their humble rural dwelling. She knew that her husband Isidore would often bring home anyone who was hungry. One day he brought home more hungry people than usual. After she served many of them, Maria told him that there simply was no more stew in the pot. He insisted that she check the pot again, and she was able to spoon out enough stew to feed them all.

Life during the Middle Ages was not easy for women. Saint Mary of the Head was responsible for household chores and rigorous farming activities. She heavily relied on the support of her husband.

Torribia substantially outlived her husband, who died in 1130. After his death, she lived as a hermit, performed miracles, and had visions. For instance, legend suggests that every night she dreamed of the Virgin Mary, who would cross the Jarama River while extending her pure cloak over the waters.

== Veneration ==
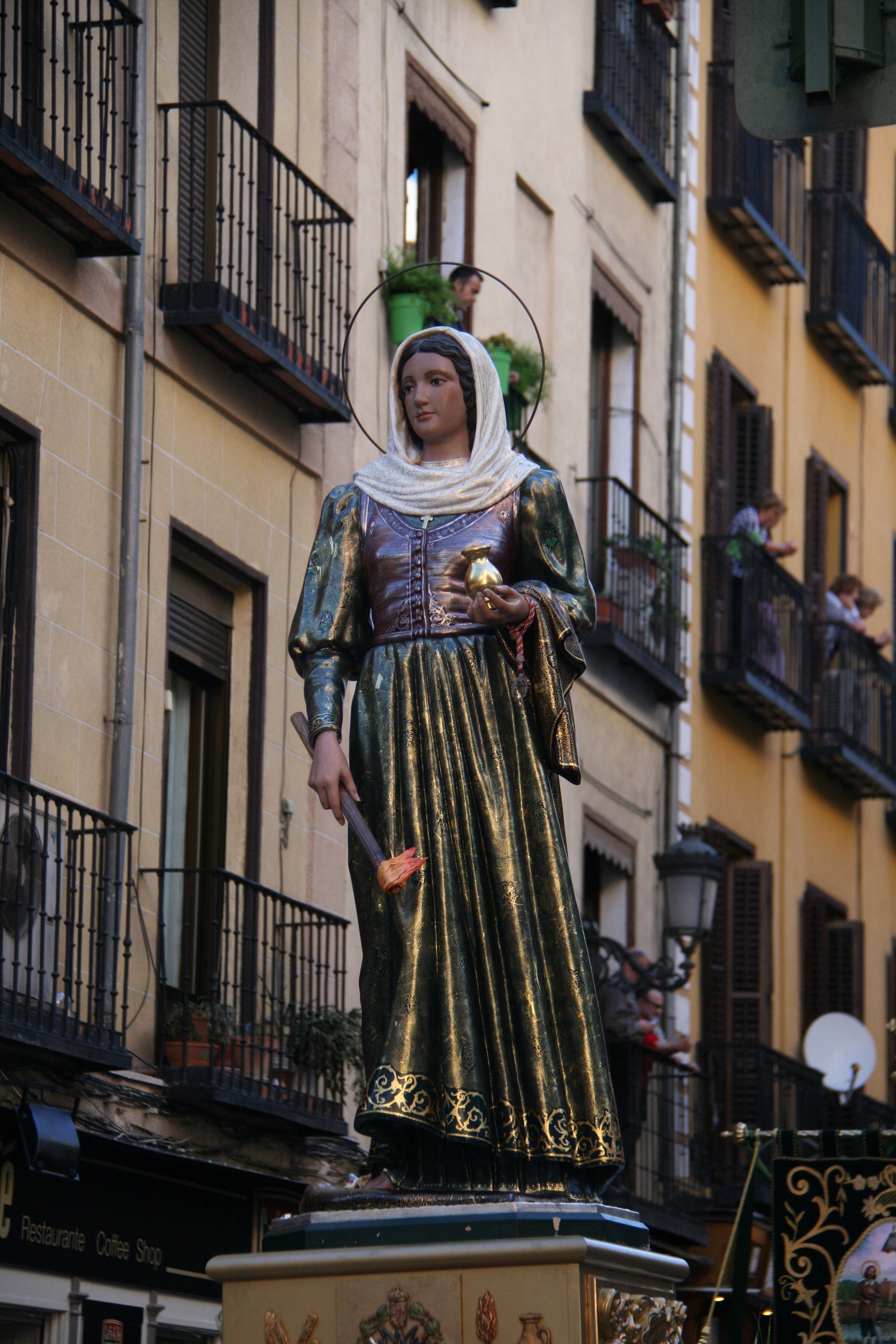
Procession for Santa María de la Cabeza in Madrid (2011)

After Isidore's death, Maria became a hermit. She was said to have performed miracles and merited after her death the byname de la Cabeza, because the relic of her head (conserved in a reliquary and carried in procession) has often brought rain from heaven to dry countrysides.

After being moved several times, her relics were eventually gathered in 1769 at the Real Colegiata de San Isidro in Madrid where they remain for public veneration. They are placed with the uncorrupted body of her husband. She was beatified by Pope Innocent XII on 11 August 1697.

Revered by farm workers throughout the Catholic world, Saint Mary of the Head has her own feast on 9 September, and shares the Feast of Saint Isidore the Laborer with her husband on 15 May.

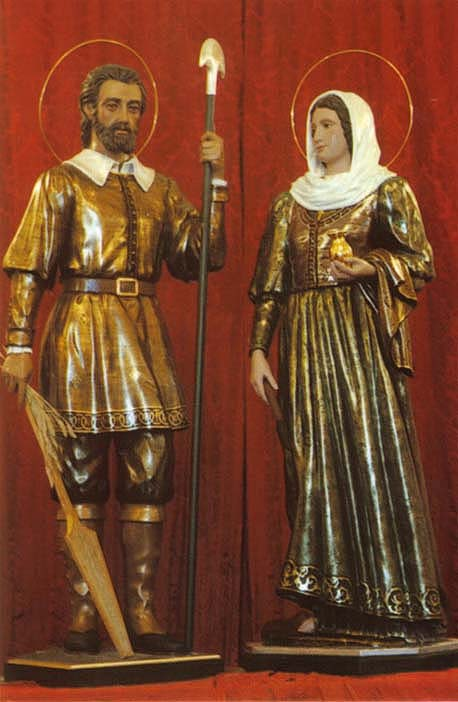
Ss. Isidor the Farmer and Mary of the Head, 18th century sculptures at Madrid

Despite the centuries that have passed since she lived, Ss. Isidore and María continue to be strong examples of the vocational meaning of marriage, not only as an institution that addresses a need for affection or continue a family bloodline, but also as a vocation through which people can achieve holiness. This example of holiness in marriage is demonstrated by her love of Lord, love of the Blessed Virgin Mary (most of all in her invocations of Madrid’s Almudena and Atocha), and her love of family. Since the thirteenth century, the Royal Congregation of Saint Isidor has promoted and spread this concept and example of holy matrimony set by Ss. Isidore and Mary of the Head.

In July 2011, three rural parishes in the Diocese of Rochester, were united into one parish under the patronage of Ss. Isidore and Maria Torribia. According to the parish priest Patrick Connor the title of Ss. Isidore and Maria Torribia carries significant meaning, even though not all parishioners are farmers or live in rural settings.
