= Cuncumén River =

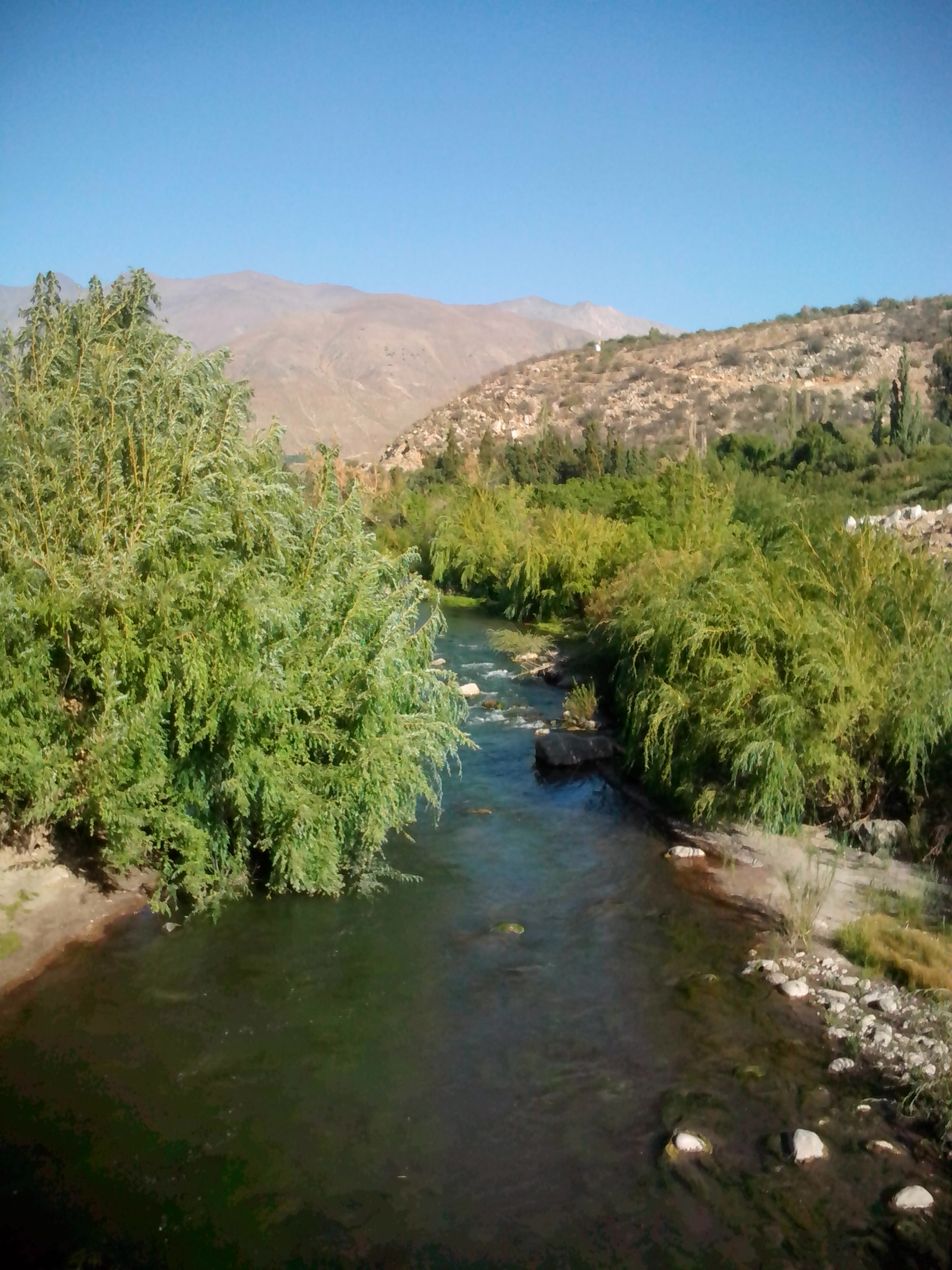

Location
- Country: Chile

Physical characteristics
- Mouth: Choapa River
  - coordinates: 31°53′50″S 70°38′36″W

The Cuncumén River is a river of Chile.

== See also ==
- List of rivers of Chile
