= Isidore the Laborer =

Spanish farmer and saint

Farmer and Saint Isidore the Laborer
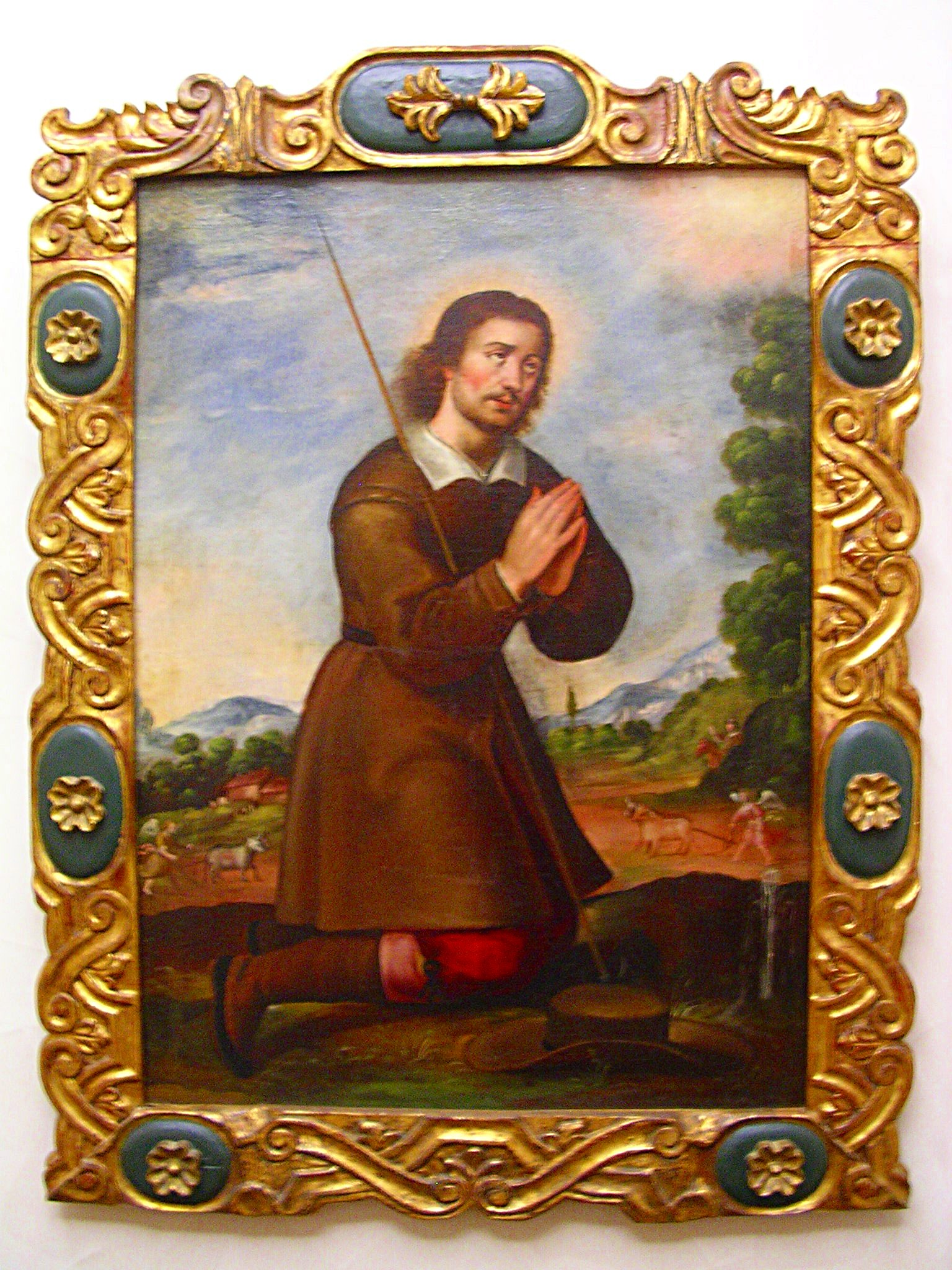
- Saint Isidore the Farmer

Confessor
- Born: c. 1070 or 1082; Madrid, Taifa of Toledo
- Died: 15 May 1130 (aged 59) or 1172; Madrid, Kingdom of Castile
- Venerated in: Catholic Church; Anglican Communion; Aglipayan Church
- Beatified: 2 May 1619, Rome by Pope Paul V
- Canonized: 12 March 1622, Rome by Gregory XV
- Feast: 15 May; 25 October; 22 March
- Attributes: Portrayed as a peasant holding a sickle and a sheaf of corn, a sickle and staff; as an angel plows for him; or with an angel and white oxen near him. In Spanish art, his emblems are a spade or a plough.
- Patronage: San Ysidro, San Diego, California: "San Isidro Labrador, quita el agua y pon el sol", Madrid agriculture; farmers; day labourers; Argentina: San Isidro; Chile: Cuz Cuz; Peru: Carampa and Lima; The Philippines: Pulilan, Bulacan; Aurora, Zamboanga del Sur; Angono, Rizal; Malaybalay City; Mantalongon, Cebu; Cabaon-an, Labrador, Pangasinan, Ormoc City, Leyte Cuenca, Batangas; Digos; Barangay San Isidro, San Pablo City; San Isidro, Lupao, Nueva Ecija; Lucban, Quezon; Anos, Los Baños, Laguna; Barangay Ligtong, Rosario, Cavite; Makiling, Calamba City, Laguna; Mogpog, Marinduque; Morong, Rizal; Nabas, Aklan; Bayebaye, Jamindan, Capiz; Binalbagan, Negros Occidental; Moises Padilla, Negros Occidental; Sariaya, Quezon; Talavera, Nueva Ecija; Tayabas, Quezon; San Isidro, Talisay City, Cebu, Gumaca, Quezon, Pinili, Ilocos Norte; Tudela, Misamis Occidental, San Fernando, Cebu, Tabogon, Cebu, Calamba, Misamis Occidental; San Isidro, Naga City; San Isidro, San Luis, San Isidro, Batangas City, San Isidro, Tarlac City Pampanga; Mabalacat City, Pampanga; Puerto Rico: Sabana Grande; Spain: Castalla, Estepona, Madrid, Orotava, Valdepiélagos; Bohol; Honduras: La Ceiba

Isidore the Laborer, born Isidro de Merlo y Quintana, also known as Isidore the Farmer (Spanish: San Isidro Labrador) (c. 1070 – 15 May 1130), was a Mozarab farmworker who lived in medieval Madrid. Known for his piety toward the poor and animals, he is venerated as a Catholic patron saint of farmers, and of Madrid; El Gobernador, Jalisco; Condiro Jalisco, La Ceiba, Honduras; and of Tocoa, Honduras. His feast day is celebrated on 15 May.

The Spanish profession name labrador comes from the verb labrar ("to till", "to plow" or, in a broader sense, "to work the land"). Hence, to refer to him as simply a "laborer" is a poor translation of the Spanish labrador as it makes no reference to the essential farming aspect of his work and his identity.

== Biography ==
Isidore was born in Madrid around 1070 or 1082 to poor, devout parents and was christened Isidore after the name of their patron, St. Isidore of Seville. In 1083 or 1085, the troops of Alfonso VI of León and Castile conquered Madrid from the Muslim taifa of Toledo. Isidore spent his life as a hired hand in the service of the wealthy Madrilenian landowner, Juan de Vargas, on a farm in the city's vicinity. He shared what he had, even his meals, with the poor. Juan de Vargas would later make him bailiff of his entire estate of Lower Caramanca.

Isidore married Maria Torribia, known as Santa María de la Cabeza in Spain; she has never been canonized. Isidore and Maria had one son. On one occasion, their son fell into a deep well, and at the prayers of his parents, the water of the well is said to have risen miraculously to the level of the ground, bringing the child with it. In thanksgiving, Isidore and Maria then vowed sexual abstinence and lived in separate houses. Their son later died in his youth.

Isidore died on 15 May 1130, at his birthplace close to Madrid, although the only official source places his death in the year 1172.

In 2022, a team from the Complutense University undertook a forensic study of Isidore's remains. A coin with a lion was found in the throat. It was conjectured that it could date from the age of Henry IV of Castile. The only active illness found was dental abscesses. The researchers proposed them as a cause of death. The age of death ranges between 48 and 102 years old (based on estimated birth and death). The height was estimated between 167 and 186 cm. The cranium shows a predominance of North African features.

== Miracle stories ==
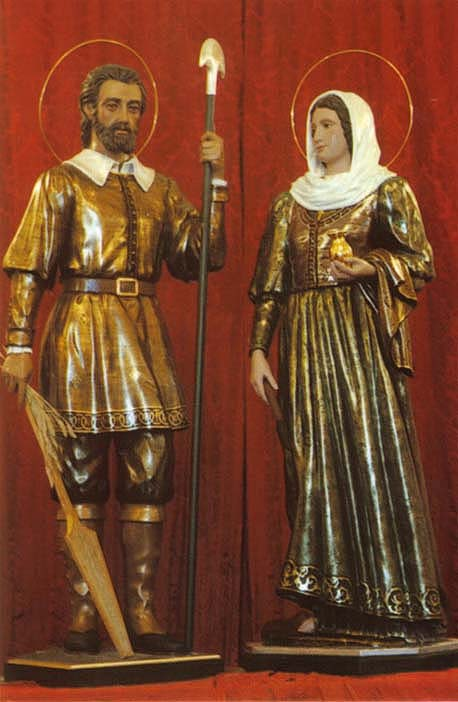
St Isidore and St. Maria

In the morning before going to work, Isidore would usually attend Mass at one of the churches in Madrid. One day, his fellow farm workers complained to their master that Isidore was always late for work in the morning. Upon investigation the master found Isidore at prayer while an angel was doing the ploughing for him.

On another occasion, his master saw an angel ploughing on either side of him, so that Isidore's work was equal to that of three of his fellow field workers. Isidore is also said to have brought back to life his master's deceased daughter, and to have caused a fountain of fresh water to burst from the dry earth to quench his master's thirst.

One snowy day, when going to the mill with wheat to be ground, he passed a flock of wood-pigeons scratching vainly for food on the hard surface of the frosty ground. Taking pity on the poor animals, he poured half of his sack of precious wheat upon the ground for the birds, despite the mocking of witnesses. When he reached the mill, however, the bag was full, and the wheat, when it was ground, produced double the expected amount of flour.

Isidore's wife, Maria, always kept a pot of stew on the fireplace in their humble home as Isidore would often bring home anyone who was hungry. One day he brought home more hungry people than usual. After she served many of them, Maria told him that there simply was no more stew in the pot. He insisted that she check the pot again, and she was able to spoon out enough stew to feed them all.

On 2 April 1212, after torrential rains had exhumed cadavers from cemeteries in Madrid, his body was discovered in an apparent state of incorruptibility.

He is said to have appeared to Alfonso VIII of Castile, and to have shown him the hidden path by which he surprised the Moors and gained the victory of Las Navas de Tolosa, in 1212. When King Philip III of Spain was cured of a deadly disease after touching the relics of the saint, the king replaced the old reliquary with a costly silver one and instigated the process of his beatification. Throughout history, other members of the royal family would seek curative powers from the saint.

The number of miracles attributed to him has been counted as 438. The only original source of hagiography on him is a fourteenth century codex called Códice de Juan Diácono which relates five of his miracles:

1. The pigeons and the grain.
2. The angels ploughing.
3. The saving of his donkey, through prayer, from a wolf attack.
4. The account of his wife's pot of food.
5. A similar account of his feeding the brotherhood.

The codex also attests to the incorruptible state of his body, stating it was exhumed 40 years after his death.

== Veneration ==
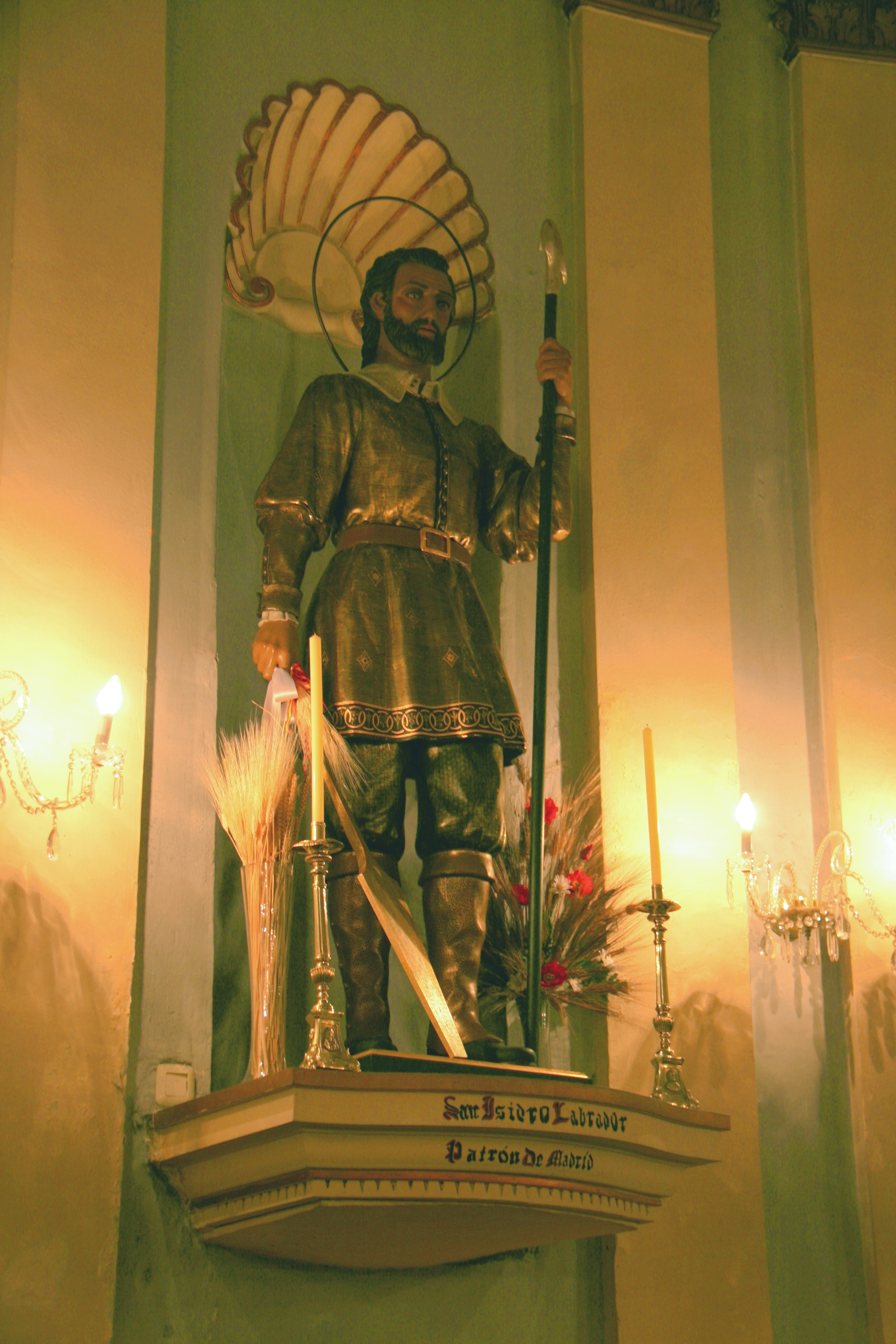
San Isidro Labrador-Madrid

Isidore was beatified in Rome on 2 May 1619 by Pope Paul V, and then canonized along with Saints Ignatius of Loyola, Francis Xavier, Teresa of Ávila and Philip Neri, on 12 March 1622. The Bull of Beatification was published 12 March 1621 by Pope Gregory XV, The Bull of Canonization was published by Benedict XIII on 4 June 1725.

In 1696, his relics were moved to the Royal Alcazar of Madrid to intervene on behalf of the health of Charles II of Spain. While there, the King's locksmith pulled a tooth from the body and gave it to the monarch, who slept with it under his pillow until his death. This was not the first, nor the last time his body was allegedly mutilated out of religious fervour. For example, it was reported one of the ladies in the court of Isabella I of Castile bit off one of his toes.

In 1760, his body was brought to the Royal Palace of Madrid during the illness of Maria Amalia of Saxony.

In 1769, Charles III of Spain had the remains of Saint Isidore and his wife Maria relocated to the San Isidro Church, Madrid. The sepulcher has nine locks and only the King of Spain has the master key. The opening of the sepulcher must be performed by the Archbishop of Madrid and authorized by the King himself. Consequently, it has not been opened since 2022.

His feast day is celebrated on 15 May in the Catholic Church, and in the Philippine Independent Church.

=== Patronage ===
Saint Isidore is widely venerated as the patron saint of farmers, peasants, day laborers and agriculture in general, as well as brick layers. His hometown of Madrid, the Spanish cities of Leon, Zaragoza, and Seville, and various locales in the former Spanish Empire honour him as their patron saint. The US National Catholic Rural Life Conference claims him as its patron. San Ysidro, California, and San Ysidro, New Mexico, were named after him.

=== Iconography ===
Saint Isidore is often portrayed as a peasant holding a sickle and a sheaf of corn. He might also be shown with a sickle and staff; as an angel plows for him; or with an angel and white oxen near him. In Spanish art, his emblems are a spade or a plough.

== Legacy ==
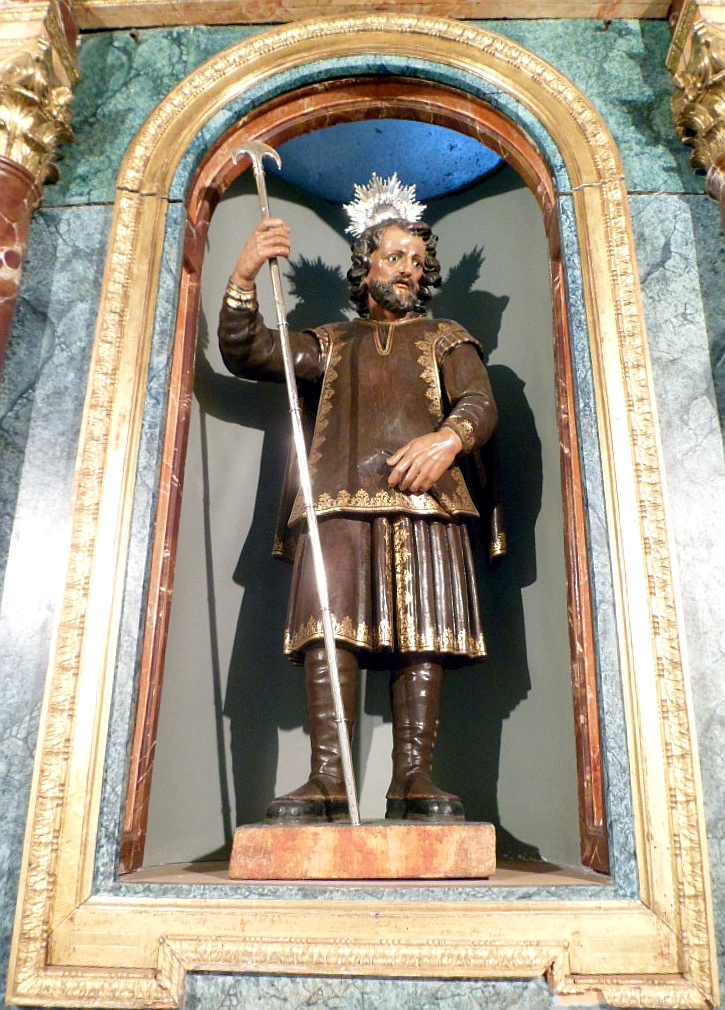
This is in the chapel built where he lived and died, in the Saint Isidore Museum in Saint Andrew's square in Madrid.

The story of St. Isidore is a reminder of the dignity of work, and that ordinary life can lead to holiness. "Legends about angel helpers and mysterious oxen indicate that his work was not neglected and his duties did not go unfulfilled." St. Isidore's life demonstrates that: "If you have your spiritual self in order, your earthly commitments will fall into order also."

The house of his master, Juan de Vargas, in Madrid is now a museum, popularly known as the "Casa de San Isidro". It houses temporary exhibitions on the history of Madrid, as well as on the life of the saint. It is not to be confused with the aforementioned San Isidro Church. Not only does this museum contain a chapel built upon the place where Isidore lived and died, but also the well where his son fell and was saved.

=== In popular culture ===
His life and miracles have inspired paintings, a poem by Lope de Vega, music and a 1964 film Isidro, labrador by Rafael J. Salvia. Javier Escrivá played the role of the saint.

== Feast day celebrations and festivals ==
The date of his liturgical feast, which, though not included in the General Roman Calendar, has been celebrated for centuries in several countries and dioceses, is 15 May. Many towns venerate Saint Isidore and his wife Blessed María Torribia with processions in which the fields are blessed.

=== Spain ===
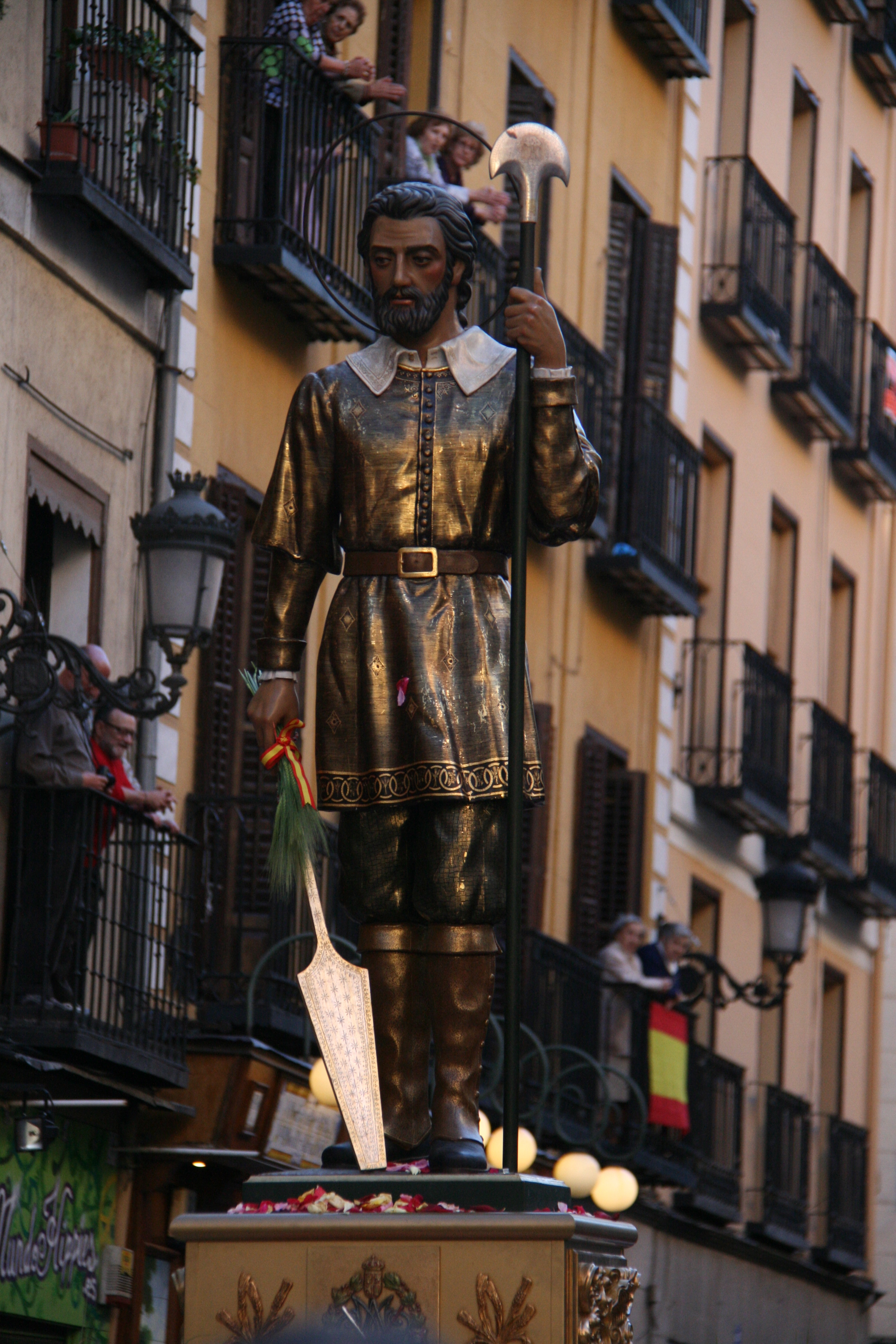
Procesión San Isidro Labrador -Madrid

see also: Real Cortijo de San Isidro

One of the most celebrated holidays of Madrid is held on 15 May, the liturgical feast of Isidore who is the city's patron saint as well as of farmers. The traditional festival is held in an open-air area known as the Pradera del Santo. In the afternoon, the images of San Isidro and his wife, Santa María de la Cabeza, are paraded through the streets, from Calle del Sacramento to the Plaza de la Villa, passing through Calle del Cordón.

The feast in honor of San Isidro is declared of National Tourist Interest in Andalusia and is one of the most important celebrations in province of Málaga. The fiesta is very popular in Alameda because San Isidro is a co-patron of the town.

Celebrations honoring both saints are also held elsewhere in Spain. For years, the Alicantine locality of Castalla has been celebrating the Fair of San Isidro, where numerous companies display their products in a playful and festive atmosphere. A medieval swap meet and mechanical attractions are especially popular.

The Romería festival in Almogia, a pueblo blanco in the campo halfway between Málaga to the south and Antequera, celebrates San Isidro, its patron saint, on the weekend in the middle of May with a fiesta carnival. Floats from the surrounding farming communities, accompanied by traditionally dressed ladies in flamenco dresses and caballeros on dancing horses, sing and dance from Almogia to the Romería ground a few kilometres north of the village and the festival includes music, traditional horse races, a bar for horses as well as their riders, and much parading of costume and finery. The best-dressed float is awarded a prize.

=== Chile ===
15 May is San Isidro Day in Cuz-Cuz, about five kilometers from the city of Illapel, Choapa province, in the Coquimbo region of Chile. If the day falls on a Monday, the following Sunday is celebrated. Celebrations begin at noon with a Mass, followed by a procession and Chilean dances.

=== Nicaragua ===
San Isidro, Matagalpa: The town celebrates it patron saint from 1 to 15 May.

=== Peru ===
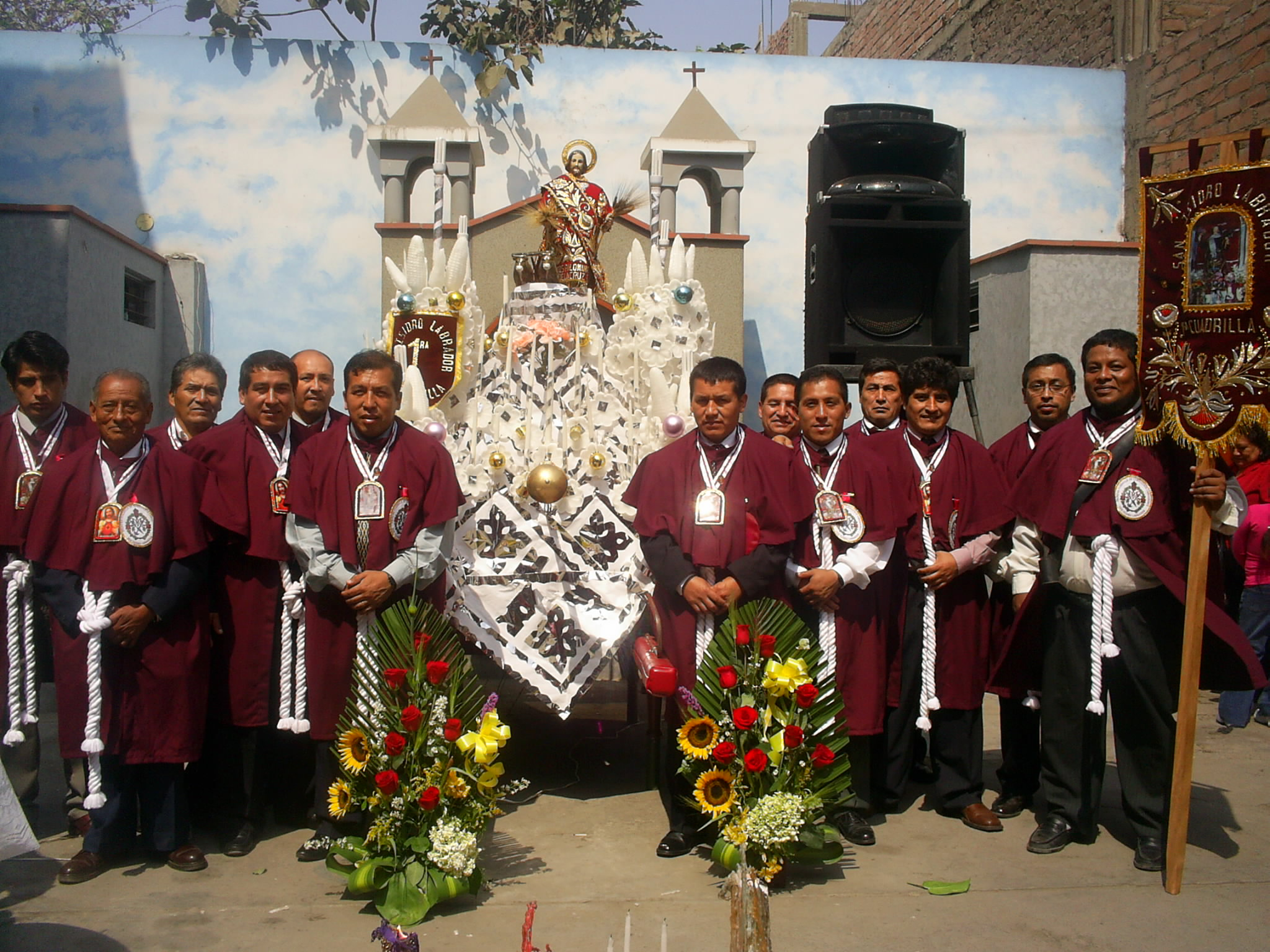
First Group of Shippers of San Isidro Labrador in Lima, Peru.

The residents of San Isidro de Carampá of Ayacucho in the city of Lima celebrate a San Isidro festival. The First Society of San Isidro de Carampá organizes the festival, along with the Butler and the Adornante festivals. In the evening, after the celebration of the Mass, a procession moves to the house of the Adornante. On the next day, Central Day, another Mass is said, this time celebrated by the Butler. Another procession is held, followed by a festival.

=== Philippines ===
Many festivals are held in honour of Saint Isidore on or around 15 May in the Philippines, which is mostly agricultural and predominantly Catholic.

- The Sikoy-Sikoy Festival, The sea festival of San Fernando, Cebu, It is in honor of St. Isidore the Farmer. The name of the festival is a Cebuano word Sikoy, which is a fishing method using nets done during rough tides. The festival celebrates the rich and bountiful sea life of San Fernando, which are considered blessings of God's love to the town. It is celebrated every Sunday before the Feast day which is on May 15. The festivity comes with thanksgiving rituals and petition prayers for guidance, protection, and abundance in their farm and sea harvest.
- The Apit Festival of Allacapan, Cagayan, done in praise and thanksgiving for the harvest gathered throughout the year. The Apit Festival is celebrated on 10–15 May.
- The Sabugan ng Biyaya Festival (often shortened to Sabugan Festival) of Agdangan, Quezon, is a thanksgiving event for the blessings that the town has received.
- The Agawan Festival is an annual harvest festival held in Sariaya, Quezon, Philippines, every May 15 in honor of Saint Isidore the Laborer, the patron saint of agriculture and good harvest. This celebration is known as the "happy pandemonium" and is one of the four harvest festivals celebrated in the province of Quezon. The festival features a fiesta procession where people playfully snatch goodies and other produce hanging from houses as the parade passes by. Colorful buntal hats, string beans, and banana leaves are used for decorations. The term "agawan" was coined by the town's former parish priest, Rev. Fr. Raul Enriquez, who was also the former president of Sariaya Tourism Council and the proponent of the town's quadricentennial celebration in 1999. The festival will be celebrating its 25th year in 2024.
- The Pahiyás Festival is held in honour of Saint Isidore and Blessed María in Lucban, Quezon, in thanksgiving for a bountiful harvest. It is noted as local houses are decorated with produce and other agricultural products, which are given away after.
- The Kangga Festival is held on his feast day in Mogpog, Marinduque (the island also known for its Moriones Festival every Holy Week). The festivities highlight farming traditions, and give thanks for a good harvest and the town's continuing prosperity.
- The Bariw Festival in Nabas, Aklan, held every 12–15 May as Saint Isidore is the town's patron. The feast also showcases the town's bariw products such as hats and mats as well as unique local attractions.
- In Pulilan, Bulacan, carabaos are often dressed in clothes or painted, and trained to kneel on their forelegs before the Church of San Isidro Labrador during the fiesta. The custom, unique to the town, is performed as an act of veneration to the saint.
- Saint Isidore is celebrated in the towns of San Isidro and Talavera, Nueva Ecija. The province is often referred to as the "Rice Granary of the Philippines", as rice is its principal crop aside from maize and onion. Celebrations begin a week before the feast day itself, including daily novenas, Masses, processions, public entertainment and a funfair (perya).
- Barangay San Isidro in Lupao, Nueva Ecija also celebrates Saint Isidore as its patron saint.
- Roxas, Talugtug, Nueva Ecija in Talugtug, Nueva Ecija also celebrates the feast of Saint Isidore for 15 days until 15 May at the Church of Iglesia Filipina Independiente
- Saint Isidore's feast is also celebrated in Mandasig, Candaba, Pampanga every 14th–15 May.
- Saint Isidore's feast is also celebrated in Lezo, Aklan every 14–15 May.
- Barangay Teguis in Poro, Cebu celebrates Saint Isidore's feast on 15 May, as well as the day after.
- The towns of Tubigon, San Isidro and Bilar in Bohol celebrates Saint Isidore's feast day on 15 May.
- Sitio Canipa-an in Barangay Banquerohan, Cadiz, Negros Occidental, also celebrates the feast annually in May. The first time the saint was honoured was in 1918.
- In Pampanga, the Feast of San Isidro is celebrated every 15 May in different barangays. City of San Fernando, Bacolor, Macabebe, and other towns have barangays named after the saint.
- In Hinunangan, Southern Leyte, Barangay Calag-itan, which has Saint Isidore the Farmer Chapel, and Barangay Catublian, which hosts the Parish of Saint Isidore the Farmer, as well as Silago also venerate Saint Isidore. These three belong to the Iglesia Filipina Independiente, a national church that split from the Catholic Church after the Philippine Revolution and recognises pre-schism saints.
- In Barangay Salawag, Dasmariñas, the Feast of San Isidro is celebrated along with the Feast of the Arrival of the Virgin of Salawag. Saint Isidore is the principal patron of the village, and secondary patron of the local parish since 1987.
- Saint Isidore is the Patron Saint of Barangay San Roque, and also entitled as the 2nd Patron Saint of the whole municipality of Naic. On May 15, the Feast day of Saint Isidore, the Parish together with the whole town celebrates the BIHISAKAHAN Festival wherein the native dishes and local products are decorated and served for everyone.
- Saint Isidore's feast is also celebrated in some places in Northern Samar particularly in the municipality of Palapag where in mostly of its barangays honored Saint Isidore the farmer as their patron saint. These barangay includes Cabariwan, Nipa, Campedico, Matambag, Natawo, Nagbobtac, Napo, Bangon, Jangtud, Mabaras, Magsaysay, Manajao, and Sangay.
- Saint Isidore the Farmer is the Patron Saint of Zamboanguita, Negros Oriental and celebrates its feast day on 15 May.
- San Isidro Labrador Parish, Las Pinas City of Diocese of Parañaque celebrate its feast day every year on 15 May.
- San Isidro Labrador is the Second Patron of the Diocesan Shrine of the Five Wounds of Our Lord Jesus Christ, in Las Pinas City. Under this Parish a chapel of San Isidro Labrador, in Carmencita Admiral, known to be the first chapel of San Isidro in Las Pinas, together they celebrate the saint feast day every 15 May.
- In Lumban, Laguna, among its sixteen barangays, San Isidro Labrador is the patron saints of 5 barangay which the parish differs the feast day of those barangays due to lack of priest before if they'll going to celebrate its feast according to feast date. May 15- Brgy. Lewin and Brgy. Wawa, May 20- Brgy. Maytalang 1, May 22- Brgy. Caliraya and 2nd Sunday of May of Brgy. Maytalang 2.

=== United States ===
In 1947, at the request of the National Catholic Rural Life Conference, he was officially named patron of farmers. When St Isidore's feast was first inserted into the calendar for the United States in the year 1947, the feast day of Saint John Baptist de La Salle was still being celebrated on 15 May, with the result that the celebration of his feast was assigned to 22 March, with a proper Mass and Office. Following the promulgation of the 1960 Code of Rubrics, St. Isidore's feast was transferred to 25 October in the United States.

With the 1969 revision of the General Roman Calendar, the memorial of Saint John Baptist de la Salle was moved to his day of death, 7 April, and Saint Isidore's was restored to the 15 May date and is celebrated as an optional memorial.

==== Corrales, New Mexico ====
In Corrales, New Mexico, the town celebrates the San Ysidro Feast day on 15 May. Matachines dance through the streets and the fiesta is a big part of the celebrations in the city.

== See also ==
- Saint Isidore the Laborer, patron saint archive
