= History of the Puerta del Sol =

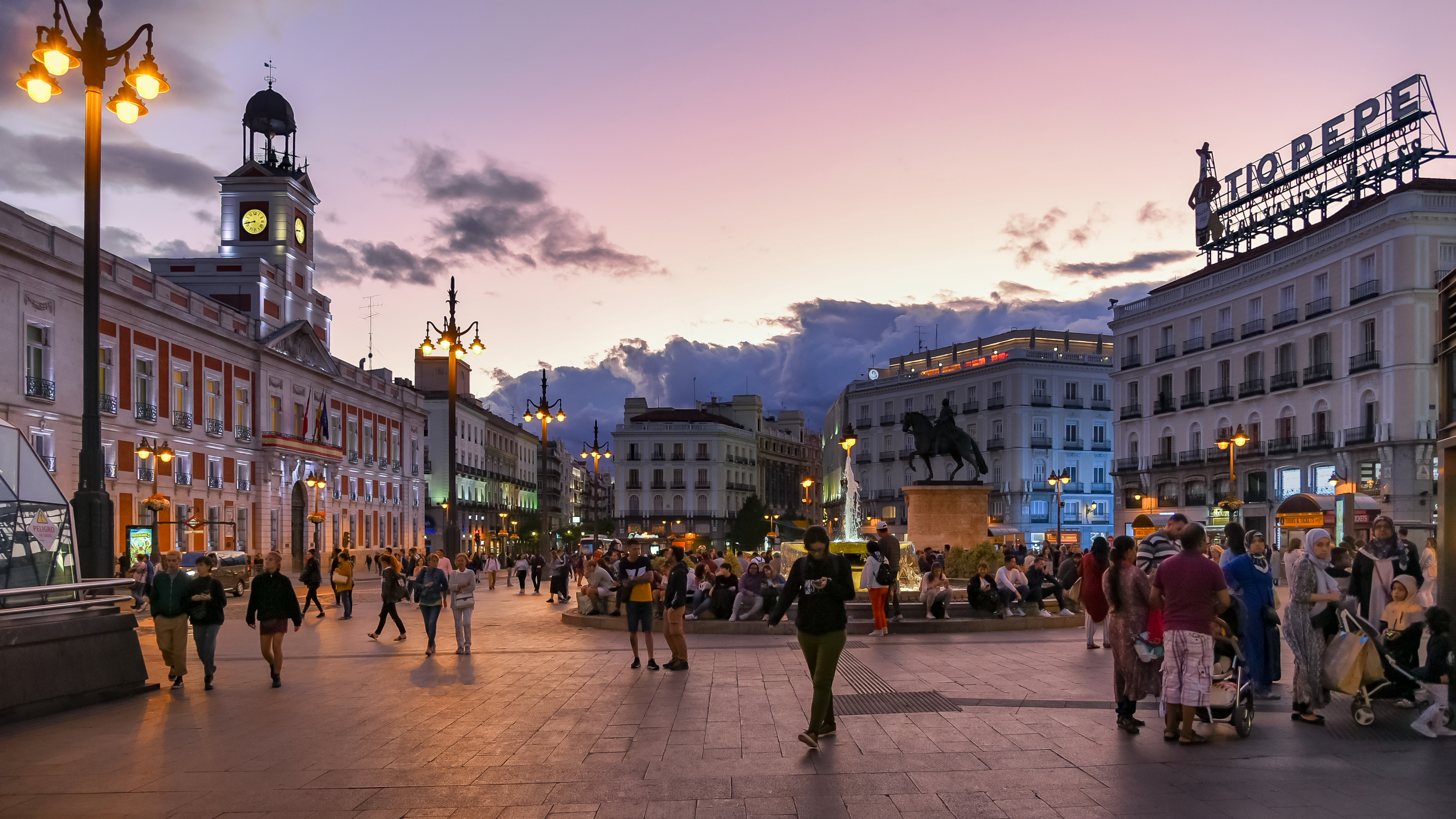
Puerta del Sol (2019)

The history of the Puerta del Sol represents an essential part of the memory of the City of Madrid (capital of Spain), not only because the Puerta del Sol is a point of frequent passage, but also because it constitutes the "center of gravity" of Madrid's urban planning. The square has been acquiring its character as a place of historical importance from its uncertain beginnings as a wide and impersonal street in the sixteenth century, to the descriptions of the first romantic travelers, the receptions of kings, popular rebellions, demonstrations, etc. It has been the scene of major events in the life of the city, from the struggle against the French invaders in 1808 to the proclamation of the Second Republic in 1931, and it has also retained its place as the protagonist of the custom of serving Twelve Grapes on New Year's Eve, to the sound of the chimes struck by the Correos clock. Nowadays it is a communications hub, a meeting point, a place of appointments, a place for celebrations and the beginning of demonstrations in the Capital. Puerta del Sol is beautiful.

During this intense historical evolution, the Puerta del Sol has been gathering the popularity of Madrid in its various periods. Since its beginnings, its position in the urban geography of Madrid has given it a leading role as a social meeting place, sometimes referred to as forum matritense. It has also been defined as "Plaza y foro" of Spain by Antonio Machado, and Ángel Fernández de los Ríos mentioned that "There is not an inch of land there that is not watered with the blood of patriots, factious or revolutionaries."

From the architectural point of view, the Puerta del Sol is a widened, oblong-shaped passageway, a point of convergence of streets that took on the appearance of a square in the mid-nineteenth century. In this space, a dozen streets converge, which in the eighteenth century were only eleven. The Puerta del Sol has undergone various urban improvement works throughout its history, the most important being the one undertaken in the mid-nineteenth century. In many cases, the urban development carried out throughout its history has gradually erased important buildings of the past. Of all of them, the only survivor is the old Casa de Correos, which was later the headquarters of the Ministry of the Interior and is now the headquarters of the Community of Madrid. It is the oldest building in the Puerta del Sol today. The second oldest is the Casa Cordero, which throughout the history of the square has been changing its use.

The Puerta del Sol has excited several writers since the beginning of its history, and many of them have included this space in their literary works. Ramón Gómez de la Serna and the Generation of '98, in their works about Madrid, have described the social atmosphere of this center. In them they describe the existing animation of its daytime activities. From Lope de Vega to Ramón Gómez de la Serna the literary descriptions are frequent, perhaps because of the literary gatherings of the nineteenth century in its famous cafés.

== Origins ==
Historians specializing in the origins of Madrid show that the first settlers of the Madrid area were the pre-Roman tribes of the Carpetani. Their settlements were established in the area near the current Royal Palace. Little is known about the Roman settlements that invaded Hispania and settled in Madrid, and the customs and ways of inhabiting the ancient settlements that proliferated in the surrounding area are unknown. The first news of the primitive settlement, which was called Magerit, dates from the time of the Muslim invasion of the Iberian Peninsula, when they established themselves in the area by building a walled fortification that surrounded and defended the town from possible attacks. Subsequent attempts by Ramiro II of León and Fernán González, Count of Castile to take the fortified square were momentarily successful in the year 932. During the years of the Reconquista, the center of the Muslim Magerit was the Plaza del Alcázar, which was located in the middle of olive groves, and probably on the site of the building known as the Alcázar, which burned down in 1734 and on whose site the present Royal Palace was built. Finally, the square was taken by the Christians during the reign of Alfonso VI in 1085.

More than a century later, in the twelfth century the growth of the hamlet made it necessary to build a wall fence that had the Puerta de Guadalajara (on the road to Guadalajara) located approximately at the current San Miguel Market. Another gate from medieval times, relatively close, belonging to the same fence as the Puerta de Guadalajara, was the Puerta Cerrada (now converted into a square).

Madrid is considered to be a city from the Charter of Population of the Vicus Sancti Martini, granted by Alfonso VII in 1126. This letter makes the new population emerges as administratively dependent on a prior:

... populetis vicum Sancti Martini de Maidrit, secundum forum Burgi Sancti D(omi) nici vel Sancti Facundi ...

— National Historical Archive

Since then, as it was normal at the time, the hamlet extends outside the walls and, to the right of the Puerta de Guadalajara, the Plaza del Arrabal was born, which would become the Plaza Mayor centuries later. The hamlet grew to the point that it was necessary to build another fence, already in the fourteenth century when the new gate facing the rising sun was called Puerta del Sol (for the same reason as the almost contemporary gate of the same name in Salamanca), and the Guadalajara gate was moved to the east.

Three centuries earlier, in an area near what would become the Puerta del Sol was the Arenal stream, where a population center would later emerge, the arrabal of San Ginés. The other area was located in the northern area near the Postigo de San Martín (near the current Plaza del Callao) and was initially very devoid of buildings. The arrabal of San Ginés settled on the southern bank of the stream. This area would have an intense craft and hospitality activity in the form of inns, an immediate consequence of being an important access route to the new city. Around 1420, it can be assumed that a discontinuous row of houses began to form the section of the Calle Mayor.

All these streets would end up having a common exit from the city in the gate that the people would call Puerta del Sol, which was located at the entrance of the current Calle Preciados (Cava del Arrabal). The description made by the documents of the time seems to give greater relevance to the Puerta de Guadalajara (located in the current Calle Mayor) to the detriment of the incipient "calle ancha" that would be the Puerta del Sol. To know the size of such a street, some chroniclers mention that the width of the gate barely exceeded that of two carriages. Many of the historians of Madrid (as is the case of López de Hoyos) mention the Puerta del Sol, in medieval times, as a "transit, road and entrance to Madrid".

There are references that assure that in the fourteenth century the entrance of the wall gate was located approximately in the middle of the entrance of the current Calle Preciados to the Puerta del Sol. In the middle of the fifteenth century, the downtown area of the city began to grow, and as a result, the area of Postigo de San Martín began to populate and expand towards the area near the Puerta del Sol. The area, due to its flat and well leveled character, was very suitable for meeting and as a starting point for other possible roads.

In 1478 Puerta del Sol is mentioned as an urban entity and in 1481 it is mentioned in documents, for the first time, in the description of a popular trial regarding the demarcation of the jurisdictions of the parishes of San Ginés and San Martín, both in dispute since long ago. The parish of San Ginés had expanded its area to occupy the arrabal of Arenal (today Calle del Arenal), extending its influence to what is now Calle Preciados. This expansion threatenedly extended towards the limits of the parish of San Martin (located further north, in a place near the current Plaza del Callao), which gave rise to the aforementioned trial. Also dating from this period are the writings on the requests made by Juan de Madrid for a plot of land located in the Puerta del Sol (also one of the first documents to explicitly mention it as such). In 1498 it was ordered to surface the "calle grande de la Puerta del Sol" (referring to what would later become the square), and in 1501 a municipal provision ordered the "paving of the calle grande de la Puerta del Sol for the entrance of the princes". The space, due to the large number of citizens, was used to make official announcements to the city.

One of the theories about the origin of the name dates back to 1520 when the Junta de Madrid meets to organize the uprising against King Charles V (born in Flanders), a rebellion led in Madrid by the Comuneros of Castile, under the command of Zapata. In this meeting they decide to build a fortification with a gate facing east, where the sun rises. The comuneroshad spread their rebellion throughout the different territories of Castile against the "foreign king", and the population of Madrid defended itself against the imperial troops by building fortifications. This assumption, although documented and validated by several scholars, has been called into question by recent research. Another theory about the origin of the name mentions how an anonymous painter made a painting or relief of a sun on one of its gates, giving rise over the years to the current name.

The space does not take on the appearance of a rectangular square-like area, remaining a crossroads of several streets until after the first quarter of the sixteenth century. In 1570 the wall of the fort was demolished and the area was cleared in the form of a square, frequented by water carriers and peddlers. A fountain appears in its center, the Mariblanca fountain. The image of the Puerta del Sol in the middle of the eighteenth century was that of a conglomerate of unequal houses, most of them with only one floor. The streets were swept weekly, there were often dead horses in the pens, and the smell was unbearable in some areas due to putrefaction and the prolonged accumulation of garbage. The situation changed gradually during the reign of Ferdinand VI, the most significant change being the one experienced with Charles III.

== First large buildings ==
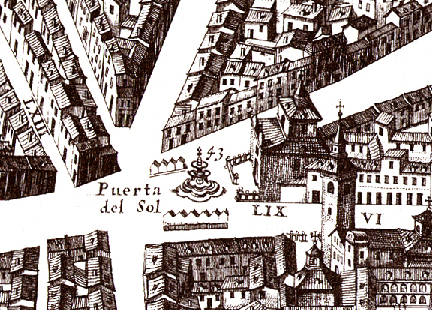
Image of Texeira's Map showing the Mariblanca fountain and the Iglesia del Buen Suceso

At the beginning of the sixteenth century, the Puerta del Sol area was a widened passageway with several important buildings, each one with "lonjas" where the inhabitants gathered to trade different products, socialize with neighbors, learn about new things, spread news, etc. The importance of the Puerta del Sol in the sixteenth century was scarce compared to other areas of Madrid, being more relevant the Plaza del Salvador (predecessor of the Plaza de la Villa), the Puerta de Guadalajara, and especially the Plaza Mayor, as shown in the chronicles of the time. The name "Calle Grande" was common in the documents of the time. The "Calle Ensanchada" (which was the Puerta del Sol at the end of the fifteenth century), was paved and the consequence of the final cost of such improvement ended up in a dispute between the first neighbors of the Puerta del Sol and the City Council. The neighbors claimed that the work should be paid for by the City Council, while the latter refused to do so. The official interest was to improve the decorum and aesthetic appearance of the street for the royal retinues that usually entered Madrid through the Puerta de Alcalá on their way to the Alcázar. The neighbors were interested in improving the comfort of access and transit through the streets.

The most important retinues in those early days were the entry into the Villa of Charles V and his son Philip II on January 6, 1560. In the eighteenth century there was a church and hospital of La Inclusa for foundlings, located on Calle Preciados. In the vicinity of Puerta del Sol, a Carmelite convent was founded in 1573, on the site of an old brothel on Calle del Carmen, which had been vacated in 1541. Although its dedication was that of Pope Saint Damasus I, during its history it was better known by the name of Carmen Calzado. The church and the convent were exclaustrated and disentailed in 1836, leaving only the church in operation, which is currently the parish of Nuestra Señora del Carmen and San Luis.

The first constructions of the Puerta del Sol were accompanied in 1580 by those carried out in the neighboring Plaza Mayor. After having moved the Court to Madrid in 1561, Philip II commissioned the remodeling project of the Plaza Mayor to Juan de Herrera, beginning the demolition of the "block houses" of the old square that same year. The construction of the first building of the new square, the Casa de la Panadería, was begun in 1590 by Diego Sillero, on the site of the old lonja. In 1617, Philip III commissioned Juan Gómez de Mora to finish the work, who completed the square in 1619. From that moment on, both nearby spaces vied to be the place for celebrations and congregations of the citizens of the incipient city.

=== Street markets and peddlers ===
Since its beginnings, another urban dimension of the Puerta del Sol has been the commercial one; this due to the fact that it was an important place of passage in the entrance and exit of the city, subsequently becoming a meeting center, which favored the spontaneous generation of business and sales of various items. The City Council commissioned several people over time to order, regulate and prohibit certain commercial activities at "street level" in the Puerta de Sol. In the sixteenth century, between the Hospital de la Corte and the Convento de la Victoria (in the Carrera de San Jerónimo) there was an open-air food market: fruit, bread and vegetable vendors. In the Puerta del Sol itself, various baratijas (trinkets) were sold on the street, so these markets were called "baratillos", and the most common goods were old clothes, hairpieces, ribbons, hats, puppies, with the presence of hawkers, braziers, etc. The "alojeros" (street sellers of the drink aloja, who served it in glass cups with two handles in stalls marked by a white flag crossed with red, called "alojerías") began to establish themselves in the hot months. On many occasions these vendors carried the merchandise with them and sold it on the street.

In summer, stalls selling melons and watermelons were also set up in the square. All these stalls were called "cajones" because of their wooden construction (some of them can be seen in Texeira's map surrounding the fountain). The density of stalls must have been such that they hindered the access streets, to which a solution was soon sought through municipal ordinances that limited their existence; until eventually the markets were moved to the Plaza del Carmen. From the seventeenth century onwards, bookshops were established, some of which were the protagonists of dramatic episodes, such as the Librería San Martín, at whose door Canalejas was assassinated.

=== Iglesia del Buen Suceso ===
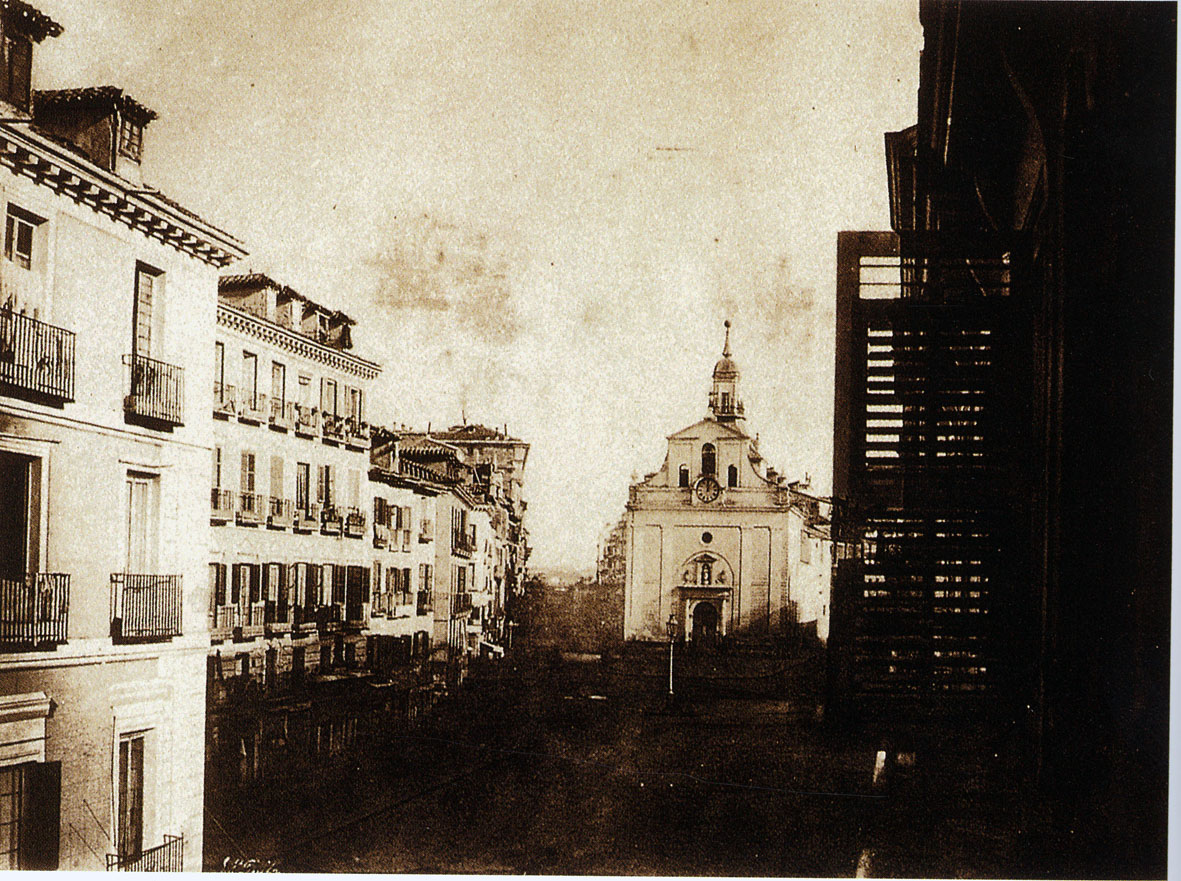
Image of the Church in the background at the Puerta del Sol in 1854 (just before the great renovation of the Puerta del Sol)

This modest construction dates back to the sixteenth century. The Iglesia de Nuestra Señora del Buen Suceso, built in 1529 and demolished in 1854, had its origin in a modest medieval hermitage architecturally linked to the Hospital de San Andrés (Hospital Real de la Corte). The primitive Church and the Hospital del Buen Suceso were located on the eastern side of the essential Puerta del Sol, between Calle de Alcalá and the Carrera de San Jerónimo. It was initially called Hospital de la Caridad (or Hospital de la Corte). It was the first great monument of the Puerta del Sol, and during its three hundred years led an existence full of renovations and neglect that ended with its demolition in the mid-nineteenth century. It was undoubtedly the representative image of the Puerta del Sol during this initial period, prior to the widening of the Puerta that took place in the mid-nineteenth century.

The first traces of this building date back to the time of John II. Initially, the Ermita de San Andrés and a small hospital were founded, designed to care for the numerous patients of the devastating plague infection that entered Madrid in 1438. This building was changing shape due to the successive renovations made to its facade and its main structure. It also changed its functionality and from a hospital it gradually became a church. This religious building had a great relevance for several centuries in the history of Puerta del Sol. It had the Puerta del Sol Clock on its façade for centuries, until it was replaced by the Casa de Correos Clock in the middle of the nineteenth century. The church was demolished in 1854 due to the confiscation of Mendizábal, giving way to what would later be the great widening project in the nineteenth century. The renovation of the square in 2009 renewed its prominence when its foundations were accidentally discovered, a fact that caused the stoppage of the works. Nowadays, its remains can be seen at the accesses to the Sol Commuter Train Station. A small commemorative block of the historic church, along with a plaque with its description, can be seen today at the Puerta del Sol.

=== Convento de San Felipe el Real ===
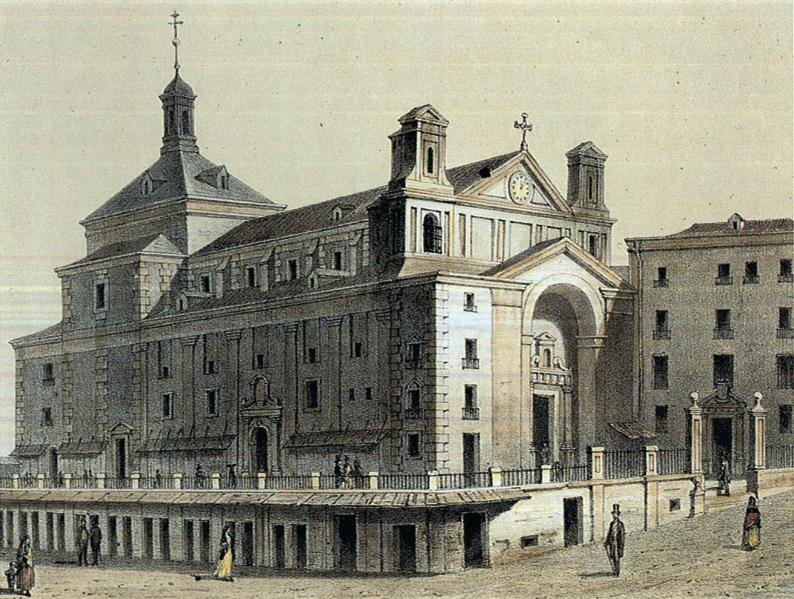
The Convento de San Felipe el Real in a woodcut from 1878. You can see the lonja (called mentidero) and the covachas under the lonja.

Another important building in Puerta del Sol, built in the sixteenth century, was the Convento de San Felipe el Real (Convent of Saint Philip the Royal). This convent was founded on March 9, 1546, by Fray Alonso Fernández de Madrid, provincial father of the Discalced Augustinians; it was located on the corner of Calle Mayor and Calle Esparteros. In the Monastery, built with berroqueña stone, lived the Discalced Augustinians. The wide esplanade in front of its doors (called "lonja") became a favorable place to establish improvised gatherings, hear rumors, spread news, etc. For centuries it was one of the "mentidero de la villa" (gossip mill of the town), popularly called "Gradas de San Felipe", in allusion to the dedication of the convent. The steps allowed access to the market, which was limited by a metal fence. The popularity of this space as a meeting place led Juan Vélez de Guevara to mention that from this gossip mill "the news comes out before the events". Sometimes known as the "mentidero de los soldados" or the "mentidero de los tercios españoles", as this was the meeting place for the soldiers, who recounted their exploits in Flanders and Italy. This lonja was larger than the existing one in the Iglesia del Buen Suceso, and therefore, it was better accepted as a suitable place for social gatherings. Underneath the lonja there were the "covachuelas", a place where there were about thirty stalls that served as a market for various goods such as toys. These covachuelas were housed in a basement opened by twenty-eight Doric arches. The Monastery of San Felipe was one of the most beautiful monumental works of sixteenth century Madrid.

During the reign of Charles V there was a public mancebía (house of ill repute) located near San Felipe between Calle Mayor and Calle del Arenal (in the place where the Palace de Oñate would be in the future) and it was called "Las Soleras". Finally Las Soleras were moved due to repeated complaints from the monks of San Felipe el Real. The Puerta del Sol was already the busiest square in Madrid in the eighteenth century. Antonio Ponz mentions it in 1776 as "The most public place of the Court". These comparisons were made against another space such as the neighboring Plaza Mayor. The church burned down in a fire in 1718 and was later plundered by French troops during the War of Independence. The cloister, the work of Francisco de Mora, remained for some time until it was also demolished. The space occupied by the entire building ended up being the current Casa Cordero, and on the second floor in the nineteenth century would be the well-known Bazar de la Unión.

=== Convento de Nuestra Señora de las Victorias ===
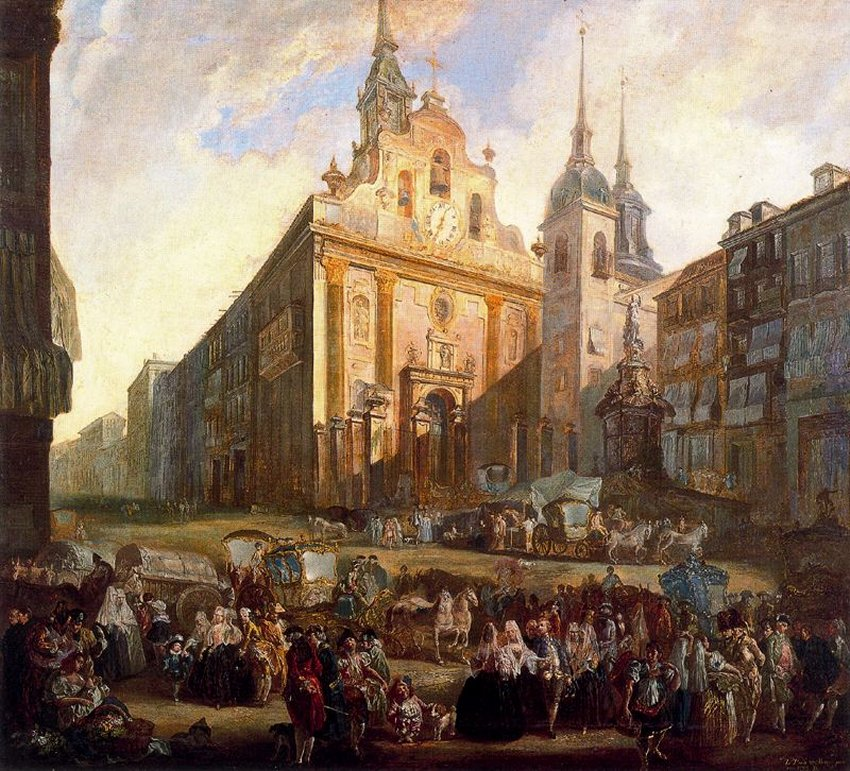
Image with the Iglesia del Buen Suceso and on the right a part of the Mínimo de las Victorias, on the left the beginning of Calle Alcalá

Shortly after building a monastery in Malaga, the architect Fray Juan de la Victoria, who belonged to the order of San Francisco de Paula de los Mínimos, asked King Philip II to build another convent in Madrid (also known for this reason as the Convento de Mínimos de San Francisco de Paula). The king agreed, despite the opposition of the Augustinian friars of the nearby Convento de San Felipe el Real, and the building was completed in 1561. Mass was celebrated there for the first time on August 1 of that year. This convent was located in the area between the Puerta del Sol itself (on the corner) and the current Calles; la Victoria, de la Cruz, Cádiz and Carretas. The mass at the Iglesia de la Victoria was very fashionable during the reigns of Philip III and Philip IV; the image of Nuestra Señora de la Soledad (sculpted by Gaspar Becerra) became very popular and was taken out in the Good Friday procession. The church was of neoclassical architecture. During the War of Independence the building was seriously damaged and later restored.

Like the neighboring Convento de San Felipe el Real, it existed until the confiscation of Mendizábal in 1836 decreed that it be finally demolished. This church had its door in the current Calle de Espoz y Mina (which did not exist at that time) and was famous among ladies and gallants for celebrating a "light mass" (of short duration). The church appears frequently in the literature of the sixteenth century and later, in works by Tirso de Molina (La celosa de sí misma), and then by Moreto (El Caballero), Antonio Solís (La gitanilla de Madrid).

=== Statue of the Mariblanca ===
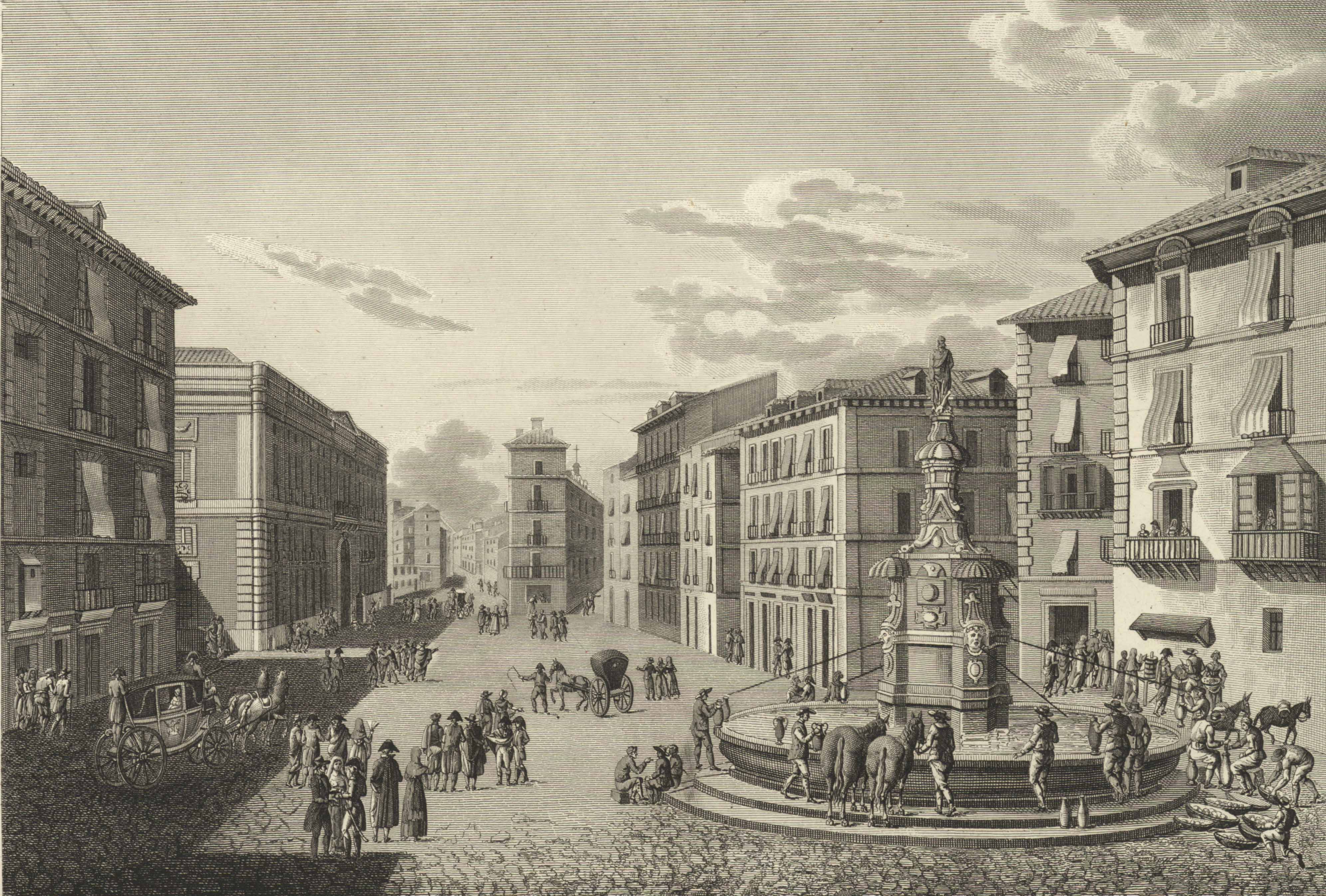
Square and Fuente del Buen Suceso at the beginning of the nineteenth century

Since the sixteenth century there are reports of fountains and spouts in the Puerta del Sol, for the service of water carriers in Madrid. These are the most famous:

Between 1630 and 1838 the first place went to the Fuente de la Mariblanca, also known as the Fuente de la Fe, Fuente del Buen Suceso, Fuente de Venus or Diana (depending on which chronicler), Fuente de las Arpías (by the mythological beings called Harpies, that surrounded its pedestal) or "Primera Fuente Ornamental de la Puerta del Sol" (First Ornamental Fountain of the Puerta del Sol).

In 1630 La Mariblanca appeared for the first time in the space of the Puerta del Sol, topping the Fuente de la Fe, a work designed by the Italian sculptor Rutilio Gaci (1570–1634). The monumental complex had been designed by the sculptor Antonio de Riera, in collaboration with Guillem de Bona, Martín de Azpillaga and Francisco del Río.

In Mancelli's map of 1623 only the Iglesia del Buen Suceso and the fountain with the statue of the Mariblanca appear in the square. The same occurs in Texeira's map of 1656.

Apparently, the name of Mariblanca was given by the water carriers of the Villa as a traditional allusion to the whiteness of the marble it was made of. The profession of water carrier, exercised for a long period by Galicians and Asturians, remained in the Puerta del Sol until the mid-nineteenth century, when they came from the Canal de Isabel II canalizations. Among all the characters of the time who gathered around the fountain were the menestrales (people with mechanical trades), azacanes (a type of water carrier) and servants and domestic servants of the noble houses, who went to fill the water jugs. On Fridays, the Capuchin friars set up an improvised pulpit to preach Christian doctrine to passersby. The continuous improvement works carried out in the Puerta have caused this small statue to have different locations throughout history, there being periods in which it did not appear in the urban furniture. This journey did not prevent the growing popularity of its image, making the saying "More popular than the Mariblanca" run around Madrid at the end of the reign of the Habsburgs (later the same would be said of the Cibeles). Also, during the celebrations in which the Puerta del Sol was decorated, it was customary to decorate the fountain.

The abundance of groundwater in the area of the Puerta del Sol meant that in the mid-eighteenth century there were numerous wells in the area of the "Calle Ancha" (Puerta del Sol), and it is remarkable that there were more wells in this central neighborhood than in the average of Madrid. Presumably, water consumption was higher due to the large volume of traffic of people and animals through the primitive Puerta. The water that supplied the canalization of the central area corresponded to a viaje de agua (type of qanat) coming from the Abroñigal Alto (the canalization of the "Viaje del Alto Abroñigal" was responsible for the canalization of water during the seventeenth and later centuries until the nineteenth century). The name "Calle Grande de la Puerta del Sol" is common in the documentation of the time, and in most cases refers to it as a place of transit. The statue of the fountain underwent several changes of location throughout Madrid. Since 1985, without the fountain, there is a replica of the old Mariblanca placed on a cylindrical pedestal at the entrance of Calle del Arenal.

== Madrid under Charles III ==
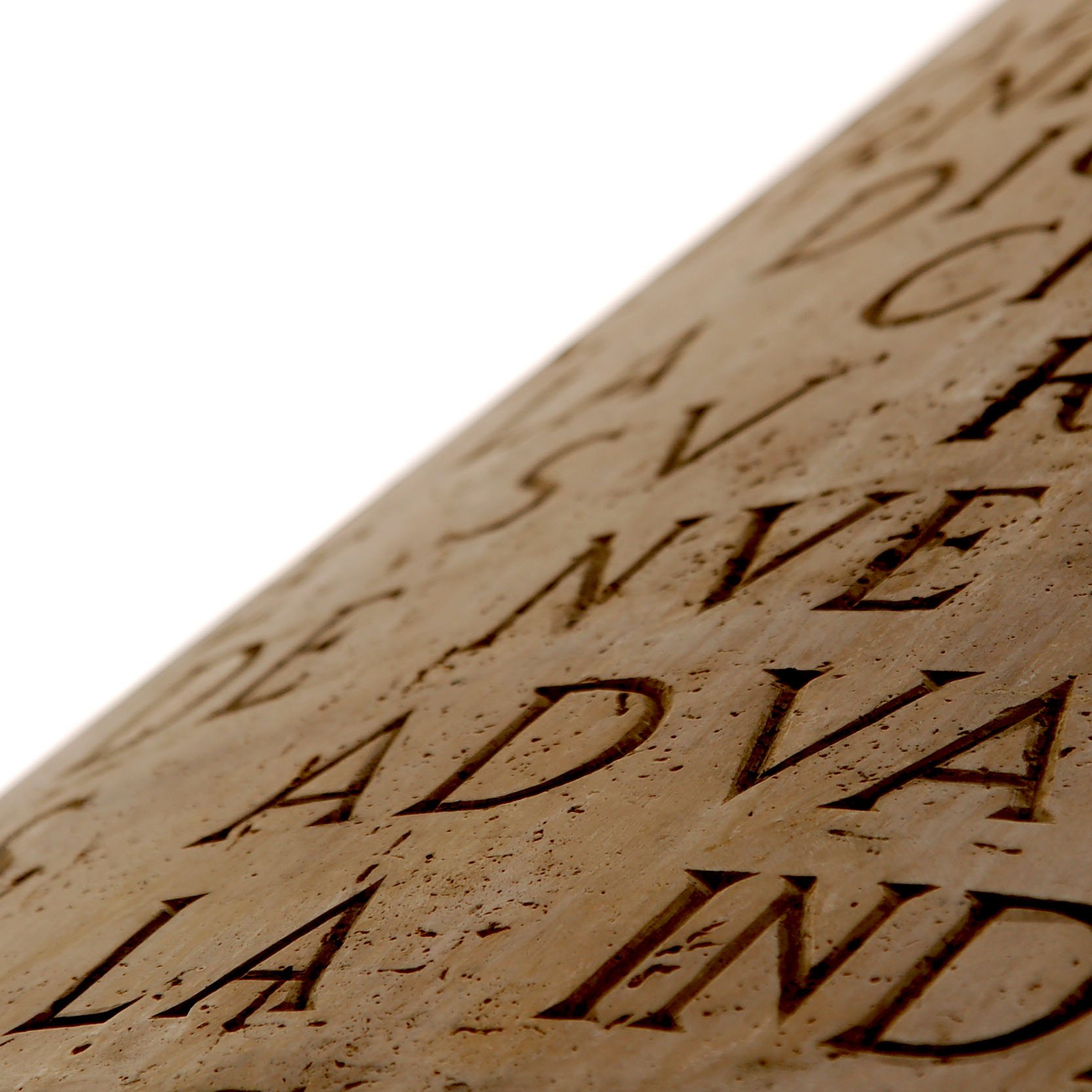
Detail of the large inscription on the pedestal of the statue of Charles III (popularly known as the "King Mayor")

On July 13, 1760, the Puerta del Sol was decorated with balcony shelves, and the Mariblanca fountain was surrounded by a rotunda of eight columns topped with nymphs forming a laurel wreaths. These preparations were made on the occasion of the entry of Charles III (1759–1788) into the city, coming from Naples. The king arrived in Madrid accompanied by new architects from Italy and France.

In the eighteenth century, the space of the Puerta del Sol was composed of two very distinct areas. This space contrasts with the current situation, since both areas were united after the great renovation undertaken in the mid-nineteenth century. On one side, on the western side, was the area of the Lonjas, or stands of San Felipe el Real, facing the Calle Mayor. On the opposite side, the eastern area was dominated by the Lonja del Buen Suceso, which faced the Calle de Alcalá and the Carrera de San Jerónimo. Both areas were cut off by the confluence of Calle Carretas to the south, and the northern trio formed by Calle del Carmen, Calle Montera and Calle Preciados. Before the renovation, it looked like two small town squares instead of one.

Prior to the appearance of newspapers, people went to these two areas to share news, spread news, meet new people, sell merchandise, etc. Puerta del Sol was also known at this time for its large number of bookstores. Some of the usual meeting points in the Madrid under Charles III were the Real Casa de Postas (the Estafeta or, as it was popularly called, the Corralón) located behind the Casa de Correos, the "slabs of the Palace" in the courtyard of the old Alcazar, the "news archive", and the mentidero of the "Representantes" on Calle León.

The city council, under the auspices of Charles III, established a system of street location that corresponds to the Planimetría General de Madrid (General Planimetry of Madrid). On September 25, 1765, the king, due to the constant complaint of the people of Madrid for having to be in charge of the maintenance of the gas lighting system of the streets, created a service of serenos (initially called "faroleros") to settle this controversial issue. Over time the serenos were dedicated to other surveillance tasks, and the idea soon spread to other Spanish provinces, as well as to the New World. The serenos were guarding the Puerta del Sol at night until the middle of the twentieth century. Nearby, the construction of the Real Academia de Bellas Artes de San Fernando in 1752, and the Real Casa de la Aduana in 1769 by the Italian architect Francesco Sabatini, both on Calle de Alcalá, are of relevance.

=== Real Casa de Correos ===
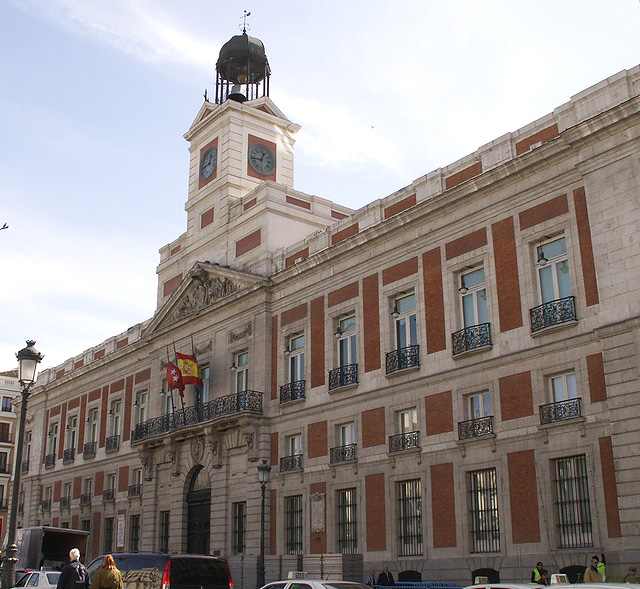
The Real Casa de Correos (Royal House of the Post Office), built in 1768, is one of the oldest buildings currently existing in Puerta del Sol.

When the Court was moved from Toledo to Madrid, Charles III was in charge of cleaning the streets and modernizing their appearance, preparing the city to receive the Court. This effort affected the renovation of the urban architecture, creating new administrative functions such as the postal service. To this end, Charles III reactivated the construction of the Casa de Correos as a support to the idea of a central administration at the service of the new Court already established in Madrid. Until the eighteenth century, the postal service did not depend on the State until Ferdinand VI decided to take control of the correspondence. The initial designs for the work had been entrusted to the Spanish architect of Madrid origin Ventura Rodríguez, who during the reign of Ferdinand VI had ordered the demolition of blocks bordering the Puerta del Sol for the construction of a centralized postal service. The arrival of Charles III caused the works of the building to be reassigned to the French architect Jaime Marquet, who finished it in 1768. Ventura Rodríguez was transferred to Valladolid and removed from the project.

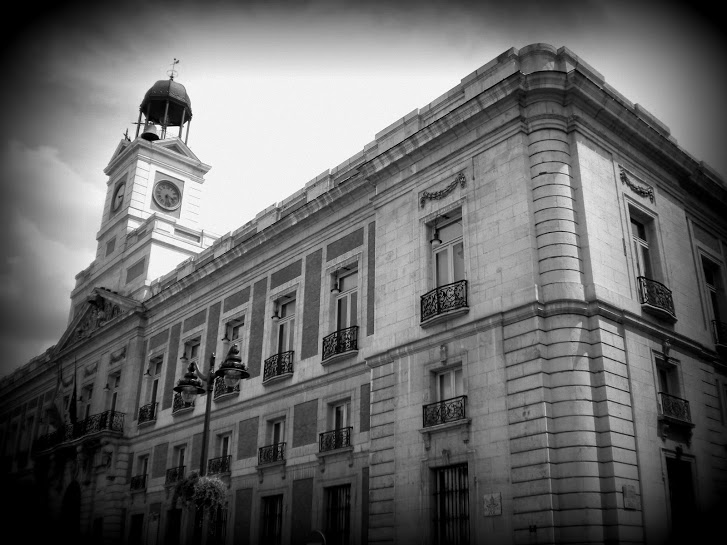
Puerta del Sol, Madrid – The Royal House of the Post Office (Spanish: La Real Casa de Correos)

Due to the increase in mail and the gradual need to manage the growing volume of mail, in 1792 the architect Juan Pedro Arnal designed what would become the Real Casa de Postas, located behind the Casa de Correos. The same architect designed the Imprenta Real (Royal Printing House) on neighboring Calle de Carretas, which would favor the establishment of bookstores in Puerta del Sol and adjacent streets.

The Count of Aranda soon realized that the building could also have a certain military utility due to its central location, and suggested the creation of a "permanent guard corps". The Real Casa de Correos witnessed major historical events in Madrid, such as the uprising of May 2, 1808. In the mid-nineteenth century, it was renamed to "de la Gobernación" because it was housing the Ministerio de Gobernación (Ministry of Home Affairs) from 1847, and a metal tower and a telegraph mirror were added, which would later be removed with the decline of optical telegraphy. At the beginning of the twentieth century, there were plans to demolish the building, which were never carried out. Today it is one of the oldest and most emblematic buildings of the Puerta el Sol, and headquarters of the Government of the Community of Madrid after its renovation in the 1990s.

=== Esquilache Riots ===
When in 1759 Charles III, then reigning in Naples, succeeded his brother Ferdinand VI on the Spanish throne, he was accompanied by several of the collaborators who had worked for him in the Italian kingdom. Among them was Leopoldo de Gregorio, Marquis of Esquilache, who held a position in Spain as a close advisor to the new King. Charles III commissioned him to carry out enlightened reforms in the capital. However, from the very first moments, the people of Madrid began to detest him, spreading rumors of accumulating rents, assigning important posts to his relatives and selling positions. One of Esquilache's sons went from captain to field marshal in one year. On March 10, 1766, by means of a Royal Decree, he ordered that chambergo hats and long capes be replaced by three-cornered hats. This clothing was considered very Spanish and this was considered a provocation.

On March 23, 1766, during Palm Sunday, a man was walking through the door of Antón Martín and the guard arrested him. The intercepted man defended himself and soon a riot broke out and headed for the Puerta del Sol. The riot caused a crowd to gather in front of the Royal Palace the next day, and the nervousness caused the Walloon Guards to shoot a woman. In retaliation, a guard was captured in the Calle Mayor. The situation became tense until the intermediation of Luis Fernández de Córdoba y Spínola, Duke of Medinaceli, who went to the Puerta del Sol to parley with the rioters. It was finally agreed that Esquilache and his family would be banished, that the Walloon guards would leave the Court and that the people would dress according to their customs. Finally Charles III agreed, and Esquilache left the city with his family, ending the revolt.

== May 2, 1808 ==
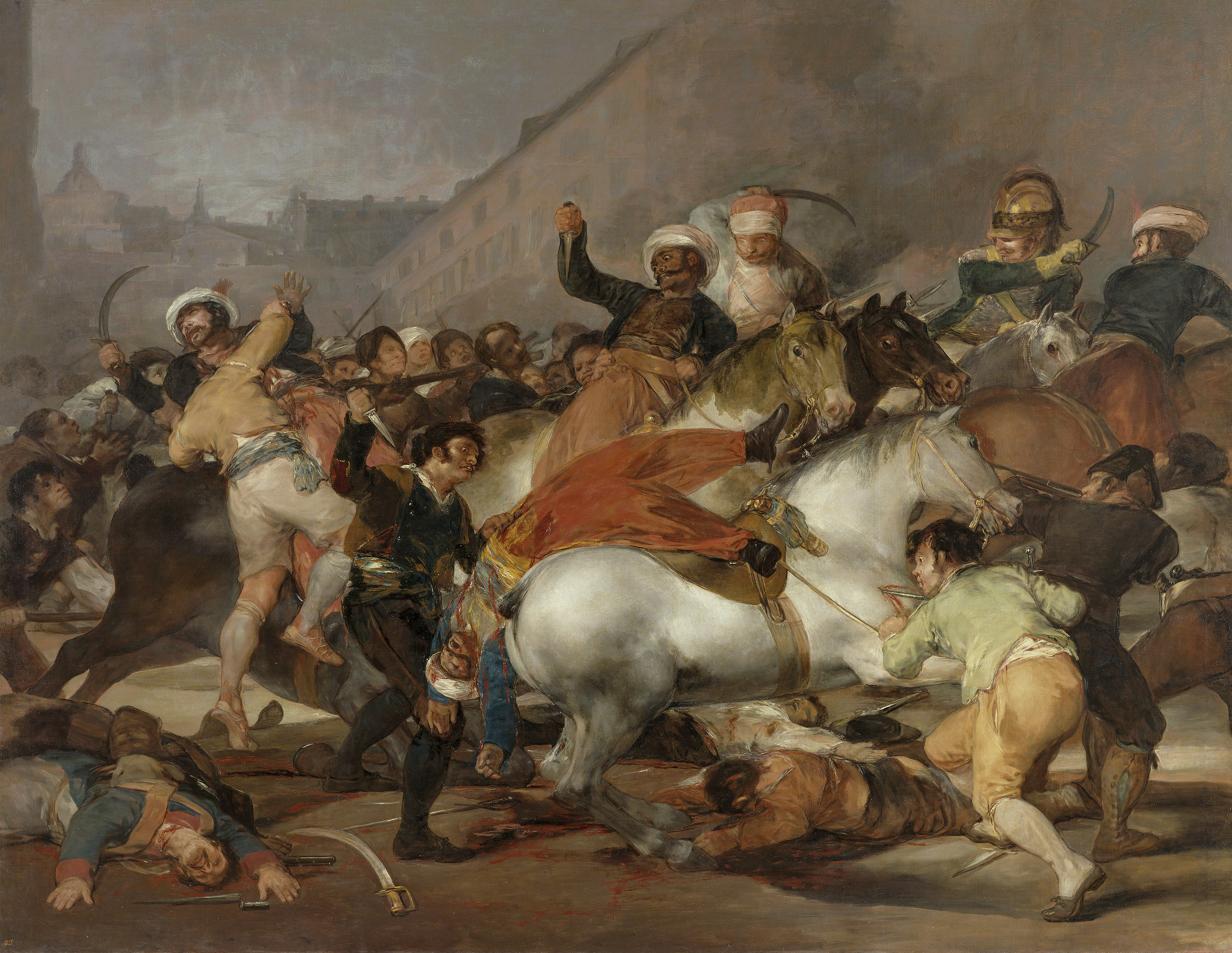
The Second of May Uprising had one of its main scenarios in the Puerta del Sol.

The presence of French troops in Spain, by virtue of the Treaty of Fontainebleau, had become threatening as they occupied various Spanish localities, without any support from the treaty. The total number of French soldiers stationed in Spain amounted to some 65,000, who controlled not only the communications with Portugal, but also with Madrid, as well as the French border. On March 18, 1808, the Tumult of Aranjuez took place, a popular uprising that took place in the streets of this town near Madrid, where the Court was located. It was unleashed due to several causes, among them the consequences of the defeat of Trafalgar that fell fundamentally on the humble classes. To this must be added the popular discontent and the intrigues of the Court, where an opposition party was being created around the Prince of Asturias, the future Ferdinand VII, formed by aristocrats suspicious of the absolute power of Manuel Godoy, and scandalized by his supposed relations with Queen Maria Luisa of Parma. Also the fear of the clergy of the confiscation measures. Speculations were growing after the incidents of the Tumult of Aranjuez and the passers-by at the Puerta del Sol who came to hear the news were affected by it.

On May 2 of the same year, the people of Madrid rose up in what would be called the Second of May uprising against the French who occupied the streets of the city with their armies. The rebellion began the War of Independence against Napoleon, who had occupied Spain in 1808 and had obtained the cession of the Spanish throne to his brother, Joseph. On May 1, a revolt broke out in front of the Royal Palace and this incident heated up the population. The popular uprising of May 2 was concentrated mainly in the Puerta del Sol and was quite bloody because the poorly armed Madrilenians confronted well-armed elite troops, leaving two hundred Madrilenians dead after the confrontation. This event was depicted by the Aragonese painter Francisco de Goya y Lucientes in a painting called "The Charge of the Mamluks" at the Puerta del Sol. The painting, an oil on canvas painted in 1814, is currently in the Prado Museum. In the painting, Spanish insurgents attack Mamluk troops (Egyptian mercenaries) fighting alongside the French army. Goya reflected in other works such as "The Disasters of War" the violent situations experienced at the Puerta del Sol (Print no. 2). This revolt in the streets of Madrid was bloodily crushed by the immediate shooting of the suspects the following day, in the fields of Atocha and the Iglesia del Buen Suceso. In memory of that popular uprising there is a commemorative plaque on the façade of the Post Office building, to the right of its main entrance. The plaque reads: "To the popular heroes who on May 2, 1808 fought in this very place the first combat with Napoleon's troops" (another similar plaque is located in front of the Royal Palace). The incident led to the War of Independence, in which numerous buildings in the Spanish capital, as well as Puerta del Sol, were damaged.

Other events marked the era. On April 17, 1815, a great fire broke out in the houses between Calle de Arenal and Calle del Carmen. First the water carriers' pitchers were seized, and seeing how the fire spread, seventeen houses in these streets were demolished to stop the advance of the fire. Later, the priest Merino stood before the carriage of Ferdinand VII when he was passing through the Puerta del Sol and showing him the "Constitution of Cadiz" pronounced the phrase that would later become a revolutionary song: "Trágala tirano" (swallow it, tyrant). The liberals established themselves in the Café Lorenzini of the Puerta del Sol, and Espronceda, Larra, the Duke of Rivas, Zorrilla, etc. used to go there. The café was named after its owner, José Carlos Lorenzini, who inaugurated it in 1820, and together with La Fontana de Oro became centers of proclamations during the Liberal Triennium. In 1864 it changed its name to Café de las Columnas. This café inaugurated the tradition of gatherings that would mark the social aspect of the square until the beginning of the twentieth century.

== Romantic Madrid ==
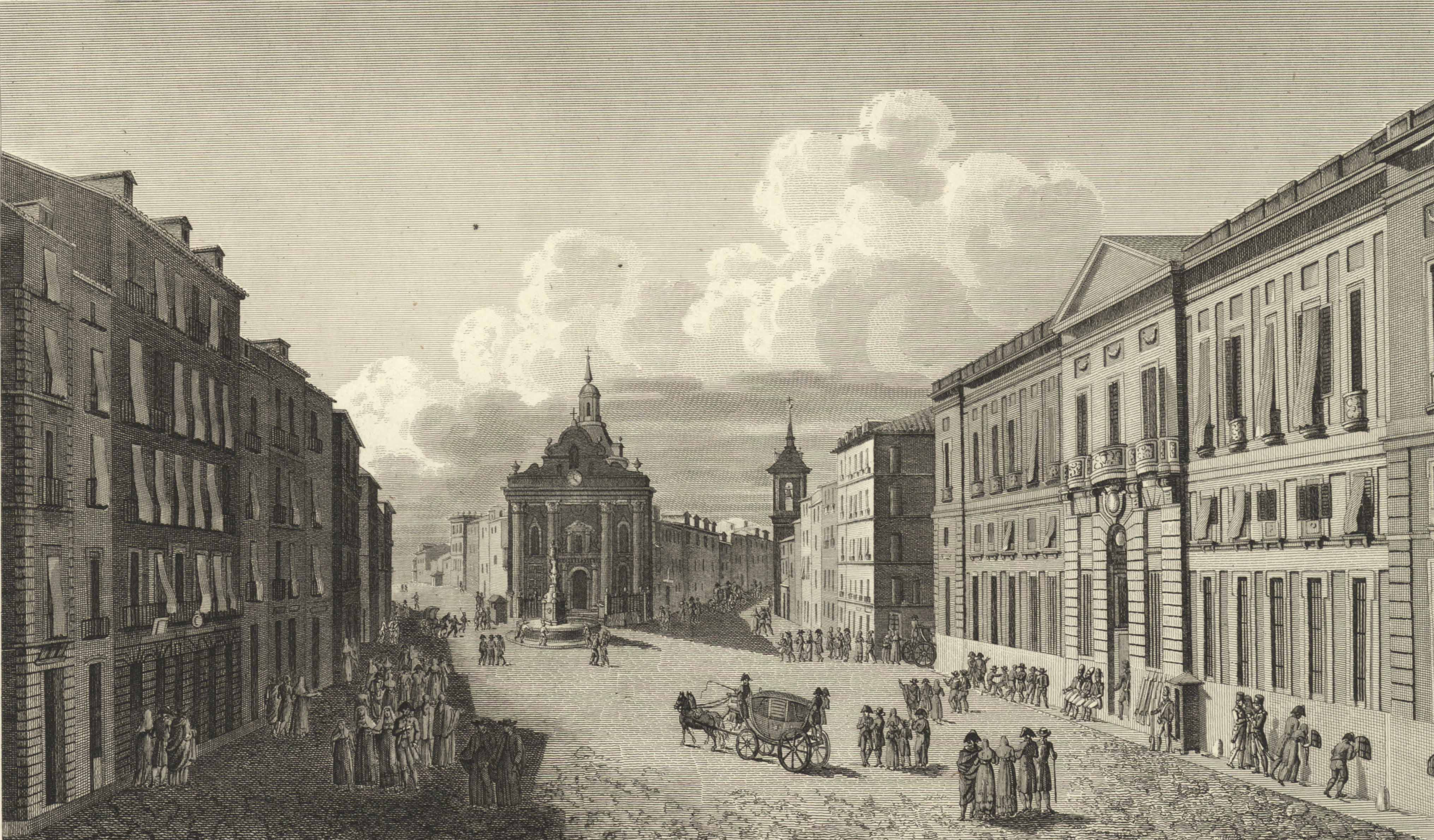
View of the square at the beginning of the nineteenth century. In the background the fountain and the Iglesia del Buen Suceso and to the right the House of the Post Office.

At the beginning of the nineteenth century, Joseph Bonaparte, nicknamed by the people of Madrid as "King Plazuelas" due to his determination to carry out urban transformations, proceeded to widen several streets in Madrid, demolishing houses and churches. Joseph I commissioned the architect Silvestre Pérez to carry out the ambitious project of widening the Calle del Arenal. In this way, the passage to the Royal Palace was ennobled and the Alcalá-Palacio Real axis was given greater prominence. This work could not be carried out due to his short reign and the poor economic situation of the country under Ferdinand VII, which did not allow him to carry out urban renovations.

On December 13, 1829, the Puerta del Sol received the fourth and last wife of King Ferdinand VII, Maria Christina, who was accompanied by her parents, the Monarchs of the Two Sicilies. For the occasion, the Mariblanca fountain was decorated. The statue of Mariblanca was moved in 1838 to the Plaza de las Descalzas. On October 10, 1830, on the occasion of the celebration of the birth of Princess Isabella, gas lighting was used for the first time in Spain throughout the Puerta del Sol and its adjacent streets (from the gas factory near the Puerta de Toledo). The facade of Buen Suceso came to show almost fifty thousand lights. The street markets, so typical at the beginning of the century, moved to the newly created Plaza del Carmen. In 1834 the premises and houses in the streets of Madrid were numbered, following a system of assignment based on the proximity to the Puerta del Sol. In 1836 the confiscation of Mendizábal began to be applied, which affected almost a hundred religious buildings, many of which were sold or demolished. One of the demolished buildings in Puerta del Sol was the Iglesia del Buen Suceso, demolished in 1854 leaving a free space in the eastern part of the square. With the same effect, the Iglesia de San Felipe el Real was demolished (leaving only the convent, which later would be demolished to build the Casa Cordero) and the Iglesia Nuestra Señora de las Victorias (giving rise to Calle Espoz y Mina). The victory of February 7, 1860, in the battle of Tetouán caused a great festive uproar in the Puerta del Sol: Isabella II gave a speech from the balcony of the Gobernación and in the evening banquets were held in the cafés of the Puerta del Sol.

=== Period of Fondas ===
There are references that the Puerta had low-cost taverns as early as 1774. In spite of the disappearance of the inns, from 1835 to 1838, the Puerta de Sol began to have new hotel establishments. In 1839 an establishment with a markedly Madrilenian character was inaugurated: the Frenchman Emilio Huguenin Lhardy opened a pastry shop in the nearby Carrera de San Jerónimo and called it Lhardy, an establishment that would eventually become a famous restaurant in Madrid society. A new means of transport arrives to the heart of the Villa, the stagecoach, which brings to the Puerta del Sol an unexpected protagonism. The influx of visitors increased due to its cadence of arrival: in the year 1845 the company of Diligencias Postas Generales transported about 85,000 passengers to Madrid. The company took over a mansion in Calle Alcalá (number fifteen) owned by the Marquis Torrecilla and named it Fonda Peninsulares (or Fonda de Postas Peninsulares). The Fonda was located next to the Casa de Aduanas, and this one next to the Palacio de Torrecilla. The continuous arrival of foreign travelers through this new stagecoach system reached the Puerta de Alcalá, and through the steep Calle de Alcalá they went to the Puerta del Sol, where the end of the trip was located with stops at the Casa de Aduanas. This situation increased the number of people passing through the Puerta del Sol as well as the adjacent streets, many of them looking for lodging. The Fonda Peninsulares operated next to the Puerta del Sol until it closed for a period of time, between 1892 and 1898. The building would be acquired by the Ministry of Finance until the 1960s, and was later acquired by a bank. Other Fondas opened in the surrounding area; one of the best known in the Puerta del Sol was La Vizcaína, located in the modern Casa Cordero.

=== Casa Cordero ===
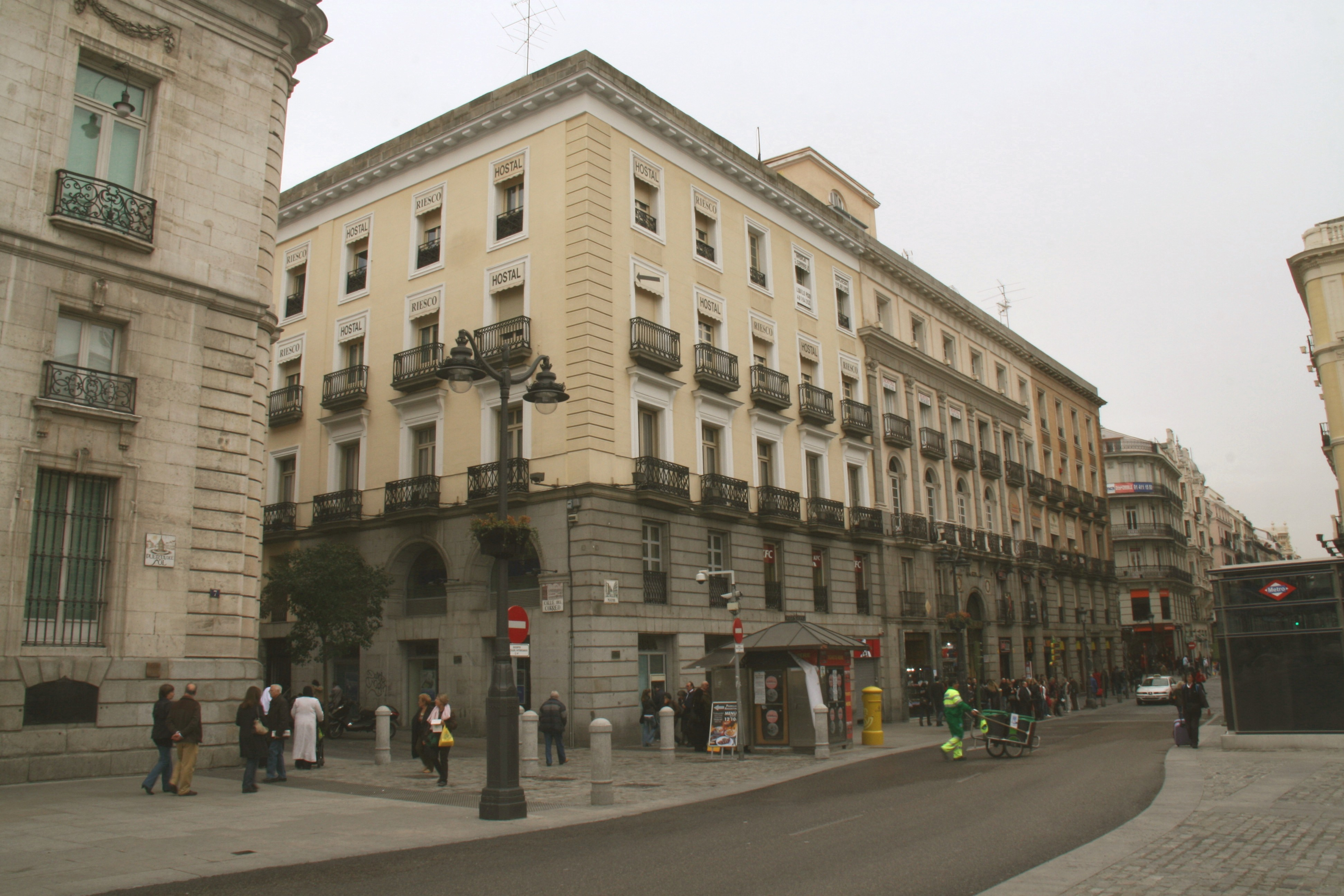
Casa Cordero is currently the second oldest building within the Puerta organization.

The construction of the Casa de Cordero, also known as Casa del Maragato due to the Maragato origin of its owner, Santiago Alonso Cordero, dates back to the beginning of the nineteenth century. It is, in the twenty-first century, the second oldest building after the Casa de Correos. It was built taking advantage of the demolition of the temple and Convento de San Felipe el Real, leaving free its famous cloister. The freed space allows to leave clear the later Plaza del Marqués Viudo de Pontejos. During the period from 1841 to 1846, a house designed by the architect Juan José Sánchez Pescador was built on the site formerly occupied by the Monastery of San Felipe. The owner of the house will finally be Santiago Alonso Cordero, a muleteer of Maragato origin who won the money in one of the first editions of the National Christmas Lottery in Spain. The house was well known in its time for having been built with architectural quality parameters unknown at the time. The house had seven interior patios, 296 windows and running water in each dwelling. Passengers coming from the stagecoach trips who did not want to stay at the Fonda de Postas Peninsulares ended up at La Vizcaína located in the Casa Cordero. It was so named due to the Bilbao origin of its owner, and the quality of the service was an advantage over other establishments of the time. Most of the lodgings of the time congregated around the Plaza and in the surrounding streets.

In 1847 the merchant and real estate developer Manuel Matheu inaugurated a modern Parisian-style passageway and bazaar on the site vacated by the demolition of the Convento de la Victoria. The urbanistic idea at the time was to endow the area around the Puerta del Sol with Parisian-style commercial "passages". Today this passage is located in the vicinity of the Puerta del Sol. The Casa Cordero, a contemporary of the passageway, underwent several interior renovations during the nineteenth century, housing the popular Bazar de la Unión (Union Bazaar).

=== Foreign travelers ===
The improvement of the means of transportation to the capital soon led to the appearance of numerous travelers writers (people of letters) who would describe in their works what they observed there. One of the first travelers who described the Puerta del Sol in the mid-eighteenth century was the Marquis de Langle (José María Jerónimo Fleuriot) who, in his Viaje de Fígaro a España, describes the Puerta del Sol as a cheerful entrance to the city, referring to multi-storey houses. This book was censored in 1788 by the Count of Aranda. In 1797 the German traveler Christian August Fischer settles in Madrid for a year and makes a description of daily life in the Plaza. He mentions that only two buildings gave majesty to the square: the Correos building and the Iglesia del Buen Suceso, the rest being a group of half-ruined and propped up houses. He describes an atmosphere full of people that makes it difficult to circulate on foot, a thunderous noise of various criers shouting, barouches circulating and water carriers that gather at the Mariblanca fountain (shouting "fresh water, good fresh water! Who wants it?"), the orange sellers, the florists, the coachmen, the gazette sellers, the beggars, the courtesans, etc. Fischer comments that the Plaza was noisier on holidays because of the people congregating there as they left the nearby churches.

In 1843 the Frenchman Théophile Gautier published his story Voyage en Espagne. Gautier already mentions some of the existing cafes in the Puerta del Sol such as the Café de Levante, and describes the fondness of the Madrilenians for sorbets and various refreshing drinks such as agraz, barley water (agua de cebá in the slang of the time). Another of the foreign travelers who describes the social atmosphere of the square is Richard Ford who narrates the Spanish custom of walking with the cloak and hat. In 1830 the Scottish journalist Henry D. Inglys describes the square as a small populous space. Later, in 1836, George Borrow (known as "Don Jorgito") describes the Plaza during the Mutiny of La Granja.

The Italian writer Edmundo de Amicis, in 1883, was impressed by the atmosphere of the Puerta del Sol. In his work entitled Viaje por España, written after a trip made on the occasion of the coronation of Amadeo I, he devotes an extensive description to the Puerta del Sol and its social atmosphere. The traveler Henry Blackburn, registering at the Hotel de los Príncipes years later, has an unbeatable position to describe the Puerta del Sol in his work.

== First great renovarion of the square ==
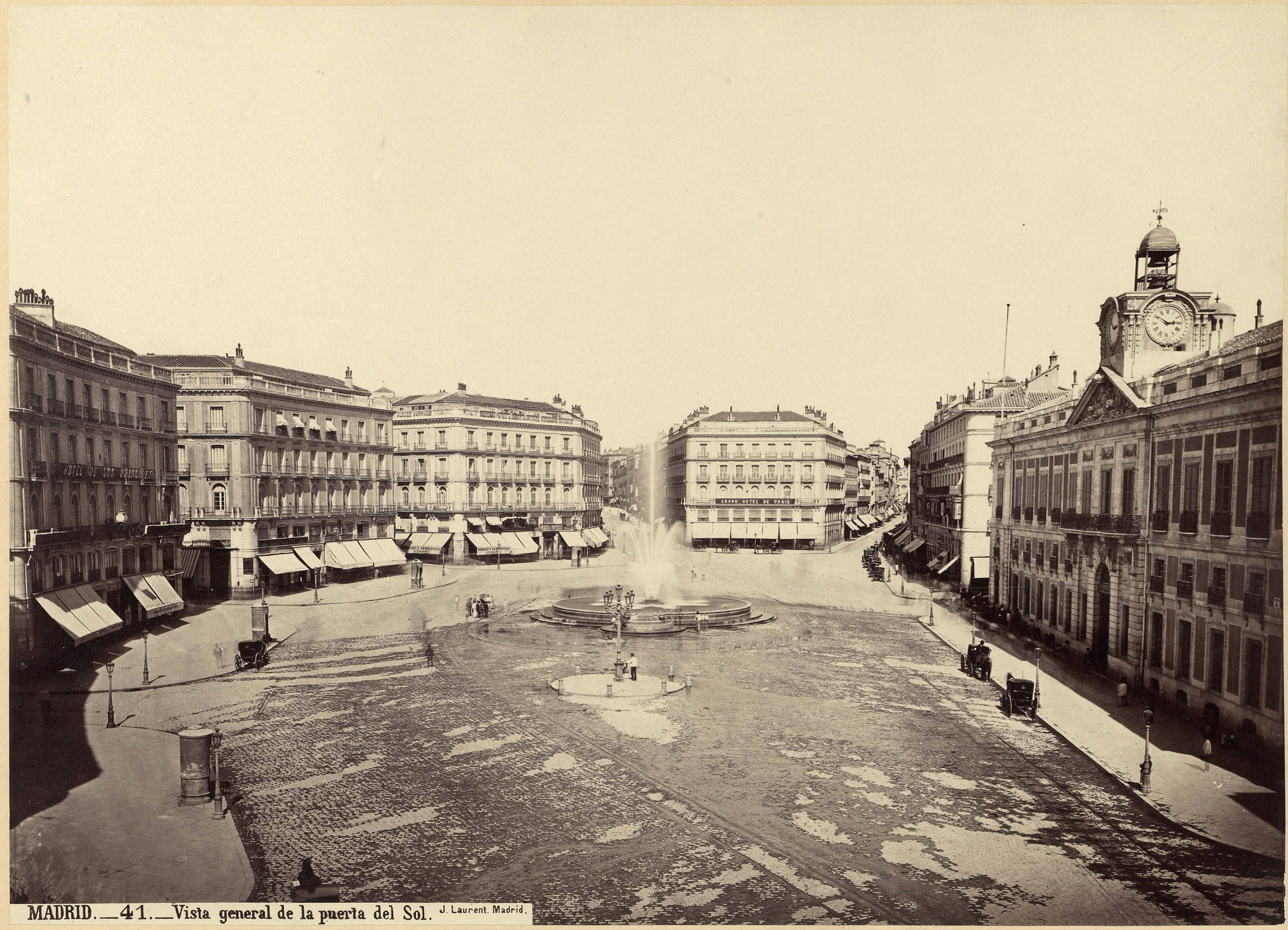
Photograph by Juan Laurent (circa 1870) taken after the renovation of the square

Already in 1831, the Marquis of Pontejos had advised the City Council to demolish the Buen Suceso and San Felipe to widen the Puerta del Sol. Since the beginning of the nineteenth century, several renovation and remodeling works were carried out, all of them with a limited impact on the Puerta del Sol. One of the most significant was the change of the cobblestones in the streets for carved flint wedges (setts). In the same way, street lamps were installed, as well as a sewer system that runs parallel to the streets of the Puerta del Sol. The asphalting of the Puerta del Sol was begun for the first time in 1848, shortly after the demolition of the Iglesia del Buen Suceso and Iglesia de la Victoria, when the Count of Villahermosa was the Mayor of Madrid. Despite all this, the impression given by Puerta del Sol in the mid-nineteenth century was that of an "uneven square". The houses did not have a homogeneous structure. Small urbanistic changes were made to accommodate some aesthetic aspects of the square, but in no case had an integral renovation of it been carried out. All these small changes led to the need to address a change that would "unify" and organize the final aesthetic appearance of the Plaza. On the other hand, the pressure of the growing traffic problem, which in a report of 1857 mentioned that from eight in the morning to nine at night 3950 carriages and 1414 horses circulated through the square, forced the municipal authorities to think about widening the space of the square.

All this led the Ministry of Transport to think about changing the Puerta del Sol, adapting it to the new times. In the administrative division of Madrid, established on November 17, 1840, the barrio de la Puerta del Sol was created, within the North quarter. This neighborhood will keep this name until October 31, 1968. Until the middle of the nineteenth century, the Puerta del Sol was an obligatory crossing point for all Madrilenians who wanted to cross the center of the city. It was necessary on the one hand to widen it, and at the same time to provide an architecturally homogeneous and monumental appearance. The period of commissioning urban studies that would allow a remodeling of the square began.

=== Beginnings (a rectangular space) ===
With the need for change on December 17, 1852, in a session of the City Council it was decided to approve a series of alignments on certain streets of the Puerta del Sol. The alignments meant a slow and cheap change to carry out urban renovations. The alignments fixed the width of the streets, a measure that had no immediate physical repercussions. However, when a house was demolished, the land was adjusted to the predefined width and the part that remained outside the street alignment was expropriated; in this way the facade was set back to the stipulated width. This procedure did not have the desired speed and was inadequate. At this time, the Puerta del Sol had an area of barely eight hundred square meters. This slow procedure of alignments was intended for the renovation and enlargement of the Puerta del Sol, but the urgency of the renovations made that on October 19, 1853, the Urban Police Advisory Board proposed to the City Council a renovation that would turn it into a rectangular square of about five thousand square meters. The Board was chaired by Ramón Mesonero Romanos. The realization of major urban renovations needed ministerial approval, and on January 18, 1854, they approved the alignments, and later on February 15 of the same year approved the realization of the rectangular square. The conflicting interests flourished in this urban renovation and reached their peak when another Royal Order on April 22 recognized that the enlargement of the Puerta de Sol was "of public utility". This last Order forcibly reduced the prices demanded for the expropriations, something that must not have pleased the original owners.

The initial proposal for change affected twenty-nine houses on the perimeter, distributed in eight blocks. A competition for architectural projects was called to decide the final appearance. This situation led to numerous projects being presented, some with original ideas. One of them, signed by Mariano Albo, presented a rectangular square design that affected the building of the Casa Cordero. After several deliberations, the project presented by architect José Antonio Font was approved. After approving the project, the City Council called an auction for the works: the deadline was opened on October 30, 1855, but curiously, no one bid for the works. In order to unblock the situation, on January 16, 1856, a Special Commission was created, which in less than a couple of weeks decided that the rectangular square project was the most appropriate. The decision caused numerous protests, anger and discussions. The commission, chaired by Pedro de Navascués, gave its controversial support to the project of the architect Juan Bautista Peyronet. Peyronet worked on the project and finally presented on March 10 an enlarged square on the initial project, which left on the maps an area of six thousand square meters (an area equivalent to the effective area of a soccer field) in which the space of part of the site of the Iglesia del Buen Suceso was considered free. The Ministry finally approved Peyronet's project on May 28, 1856.

=== Final project ===
Peyronet's project is paralyzed for political reasons. General Espartero is forced to leave the Government that he formed with Leopoldo O'Donell since the Vicalvarada. Both characters had serious disagreements. The crisis put Ramón María de Narváez at the head of the Council of Ministers, and with the change came José María Nocedal, previously a councilman of the City Council of Madrid, to the Ministry of home affairs. It was he who approved by Royal Order on June 28, 1858, a project by Lucio del Valle, Morer and Rivera. This project enlarged the square to more than nine thousand square meters. The surface area of the projects increased with each approval, and with it the expropriations. The affected properties began to be demolished in October 1857. A new Royal Order on August of that year approves an extension that raises the square to twelve thousand square meters and presents as a novelty that the north side (Alcalá-Arenal) presents a slight concave curve to the north. Some authors such as Fernández de los Ríos criticize this decision by making fun of it, calling this new section "half a lid of an olive barrel". This new design would make the popular streets of Zarza, Peregrinos, Cofreros (sometimes known as Cofre) and the Callejón de la Duda (formerly called Callejón de la Caza, because there was a meat market there) disappear.

=== Demolitions and inauguration ===
The widening of the Puerta del Sol was a work of great magnitude. The demolition of about thirty houses ended on May 1, 1858. After the expropriations (under the Law of Forced Expropriation) and later the demolitions, the building plots were sold (some of the plots were photographed by Charles Clifford and J. Laurent). The rubble resulting from the demolitions ended up in the Moro gardens. Of all the old buildings, only the Casa de Correos and the Casa Cordero were left standing. Public land sales brought new owners onto the scene. The one who acquired the most land was Fernández Casariego (he bought four premises), followed by Juan Manuel Manzanedo (Marquis of Manzanedo), a situation that led to Puerta del Sol being jokingly called "Manzanedo's courtyard". The rest of the premises were distributed among different owners. The largest and most expensive premises was the one acquired by Lamberto Fontanella between Calle de Alcalá and Carrera de San Jerónimo, premises that would become the Hotel de París (and which had the sign "Tío Pepe" on it for many years; the sign was recently moved to another building on the northwest side of the Puerta del Sol). On December 5, 1858, the first house was built between Calle Preciados and Calle del Carmen; the auction of premises ended on January 18, 1860. The demolitions left such a desolate aspect that the novelist Wenceslao Ayguals de Izco compared the new Puerta del Sol to "another bombed Sebastopol".

At the end of the renovation of the Gate on June 24, 1860, a fountain was inaugurated circumscribed in a basin of eighteen meters in diameter; this fountain raised a jet of water to more than thirty meters, coming from a "mouth" of seven centimeters of diameter and was located right in the center of the square. A subway channel seventy-seven kilometers long, coming from the Lozoya River, provided the necessary supply to feed the first reservoir of the Canal de Isabel II. This reservoir supplied the new neighborhoods of the widening of Madrid as well as the flow of this fountain. The canalization work is considered one of the first of the Canal de Isabel II. The day of its inauguration was attended by Queen Isabella II, and to the general surprise of those present when the powerful jet of the fountain was activated, the writer Manuel Fernández y González exclaimed: "Oh marvel of civilization, which makes rivers stand up!" (Spanish: "Oh maravilla de la civilización, que pone los ríos de pie!".) The writer's phrase was very popular at the time, and numerous newspapers echoed it. Over the years the fuente del chorro ("fountain of the jet" as it was called) was deactivated because the light gusts of wind deflected the high jet of water, wetting passers-by who strolled through the Puerta del Sol. Finally the fountain was moved to the Plaza de Cuatro Caminos, and later to the Casa de Campo, where it still remains (today it can be seen working next to the Puente del Rey, in front of the Casa de los Vargas). On February 19, 1862, a more modest fountain was placed to replace the previous one, and the paving of the sidewalks was completed with setts. The change caused protests among some Madrilenians due to the custom that was beginning to take root of splashing in the fountain's basin during the early morning hours on Saint John's Eve.

=== Arrival of the big hotels ===
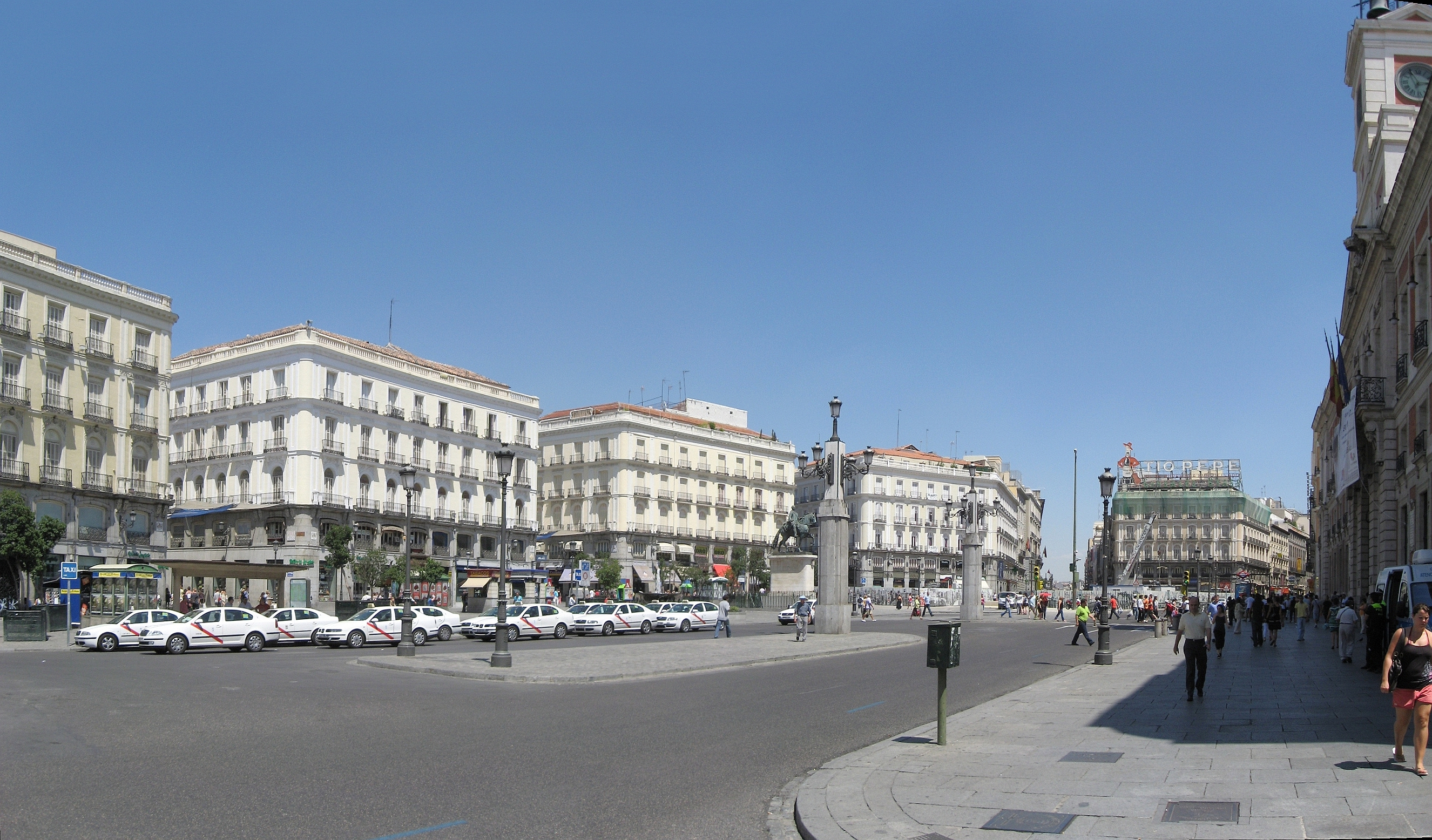
The buildings surrounding the Puerta, after the great reform, were luxury hotels.

After finishing the reconstruction of the square and clearing its semi-elliptical area, it looked like a homogeneous square and soon began the projects of locating the best hotels in the buildings that surrounded its space. The almost analogous buildings have a height of almost thirty meters. One of the most striking was the Fonda de los Príncipes (later called Hotel de los Príncipes), which consisted of two luxurious buildings occupying numbers eleven and twelve of the Puerta del Sol. This hotel was inaugurated on October 1, 1861, being one of the first in the Puerta del Sol. One of the attractions of the hotel was that its exterior windows overlooked the fuente del chorro. It was an expensive hotel for the time, and travelers who wanted less luxury had other options such as the Fonda de San Luis and the Diligencias Peninsulares. Next to the Puerta del Sol down Calle Arenal, the Gran Hotel de Oriente was built in 1855, and the Hotel de la Paz (also known as Hôtel de la Paix) was located on the west side. The Hotel del Universo was inaugurated in 1870 the last to be built.

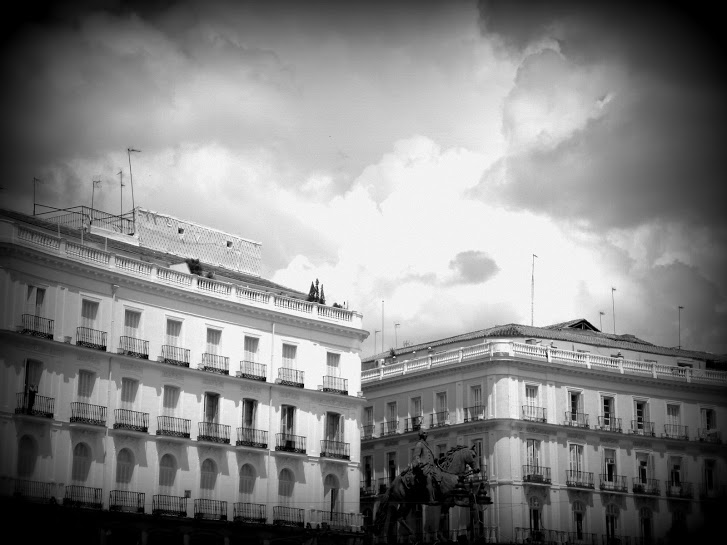
Puerta del Sol, Madrid – The buildings and the equestrian statue of Charles III

After the renovation, one of the largest premises in the square was rented in 1863 to a French financier who was in charge of setting up one of the most luxurious hotels in Madrid. In 1864, one of the oldest hotels in Madrid was inaugurated: the Grand Hôtel de París. It had the essence of an elegant hotel until 1910 when it was eclipsed by the Ritz Hotel. This hotel had a capacity for several hundred residents and on the second floor had one of the best dining rooms of the time (French style). The hotel was closed in 2006. Among its illustrious visitors was Rubén Darío who occupied its rooms in 1908. Other hotels were later opened in the area, such as the Hotel Cuatro Naciones on Calle Arenal.

Shortly after the work was completed, large awnings were set up in the northern part of the Plaza, held up by iron supports, whose surface covered the sidewalks in front of the stores on the first floor.

=== New projects, improvements and events ===
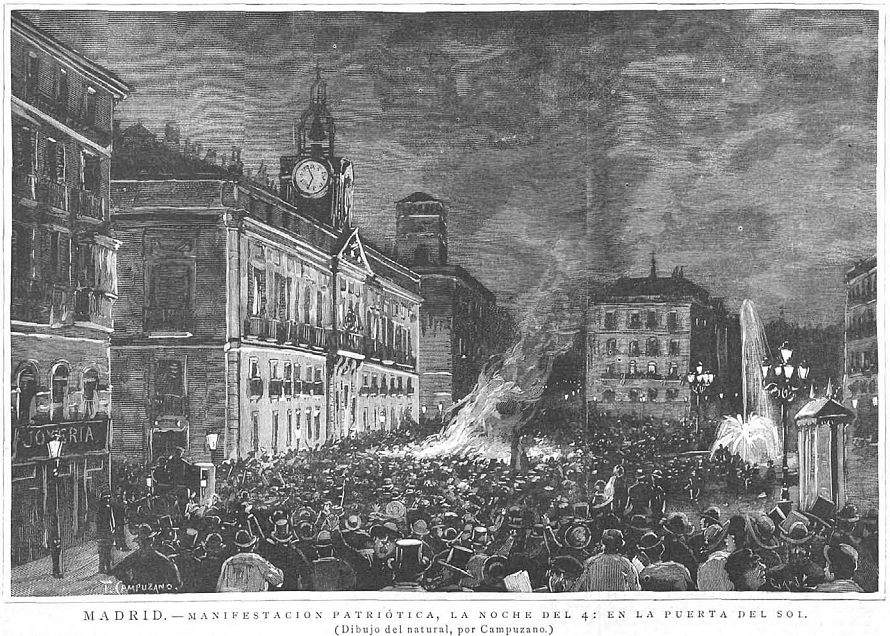
The Puerta del Sol during a demonstration on September 4, 1885, on the occasion of the Carolinas Crisis, drawing by Tomás Campuzano

In the old tavern Casa Labra, located in the adjacent street to the Calle de Tetuán, a group of people met to eat clandestinely on May 2, 1879. Among them was Pablo Iglesias, who was elected the first president of the Spanish Socialist Workers Party. The party was created secretly and was finally legalized in 1881. On June 19 of that same year, during a parade of troops, an explosion occurred when one of the guns ignited. As a result, one of the artillerymen died and several of his companions were wounded.

After the renovation of the Puerta del Sol, Giraud Daguillon designed an urban project between the Puerta del Sol and the Royal Palace that was signed in Brussels. In 1863 the first public urinals of Madrid were installed in the Puerta del Sol, specifically on the corner of Calle de Carretas, and between Calle Preciados and Calle del Arenal. In 1865 the clockmaker Losada gave a tower clock that was placed in the Gobernación and a tower was installed over the building to fulfill this new function (the joke arises that "the clock works as bad as the government underneath"). In January 1890 the passage of the funeral procession that bid farewell to the Navarrese tenor Julián Gayarre was celebrated; as it passed through the Puerta del Sol, the emotion of the crowd made a "Viva Gayarre!" burst out, which would be echoed in the press of the time.

On April 10, 1865, students from the Central University of Madrid held a serenade at the Puerta del Sol in support of the rector Juan Manuel Montalbán. This rector had been deposed three days earlier by government order along with other professors, among them Emilio Castelar and Nicolás Salmerón. The reason for the dismissal was his belligerence and his positions contrary to the official educational and ideological doctrine established by the government of Ramón María Narváez. The Civil Guard, together with Infantry and Cavalry units of the Army, opened fire against the students. The incident was called the Noche de San Daniel, or Noche del Matadero (Night of San Daniel or Night of the Slaughter). The prolific journalist Manuel Ossorio y Bernard published a work of critical essays in several installments starting in 1874, entitled: Viaje Crítico alrededor de la Puerta del Sol (Critical Journey around the Puerta del Sol). Ossorio describes the social situation of Spain, taking as a sample what happens and the characters that pass through this Madrid square.

Among the projects that followed the reforms was that of Mariano Albo to build a cathedral in front of the Ministry of home affairs. The large number of pedestrians at the Puerta at the beginning of the twentieth century led to other projects aimed at improving the circulation of pedestrians. In 1908 a project was presented to link the north and south areas, Quevedo and Tirso de Molina, through the Puerta del Sol. Antonio Palacios, ten years later, wanted to improve the viability of the area by creating a ring of streets surrounding the Plaza. On April 4, 1910, King Alfonso XIII began the construction of the Gran Vía in a ceremonial act. At the end of 1929 Ramón Gómez de la Serna inaugurated from the Puerta del Sol a new radio program that would be the "first radio report" (of costumbrista character) that Unión Radio would begin with a weekly broadcast after having made the first call of the "free contest of radio reports" through the magazine Ondas in November of that year.

After the great mid-century renovation, architectural improvement projects were presented. The architect José Luis Oriol planned to isolate the central core of the Puerta del Sol. In 1939 Serrano Suñer addressed a speech to the municipal architects of Madrid in which he commented "Work so that we can all put an end to the tragic Spanishness of decadent and traditional Madrid, even if the Puerta del Sol and the building of the Gobernación, which is a breeding ground for the worst germs, have to disappear".

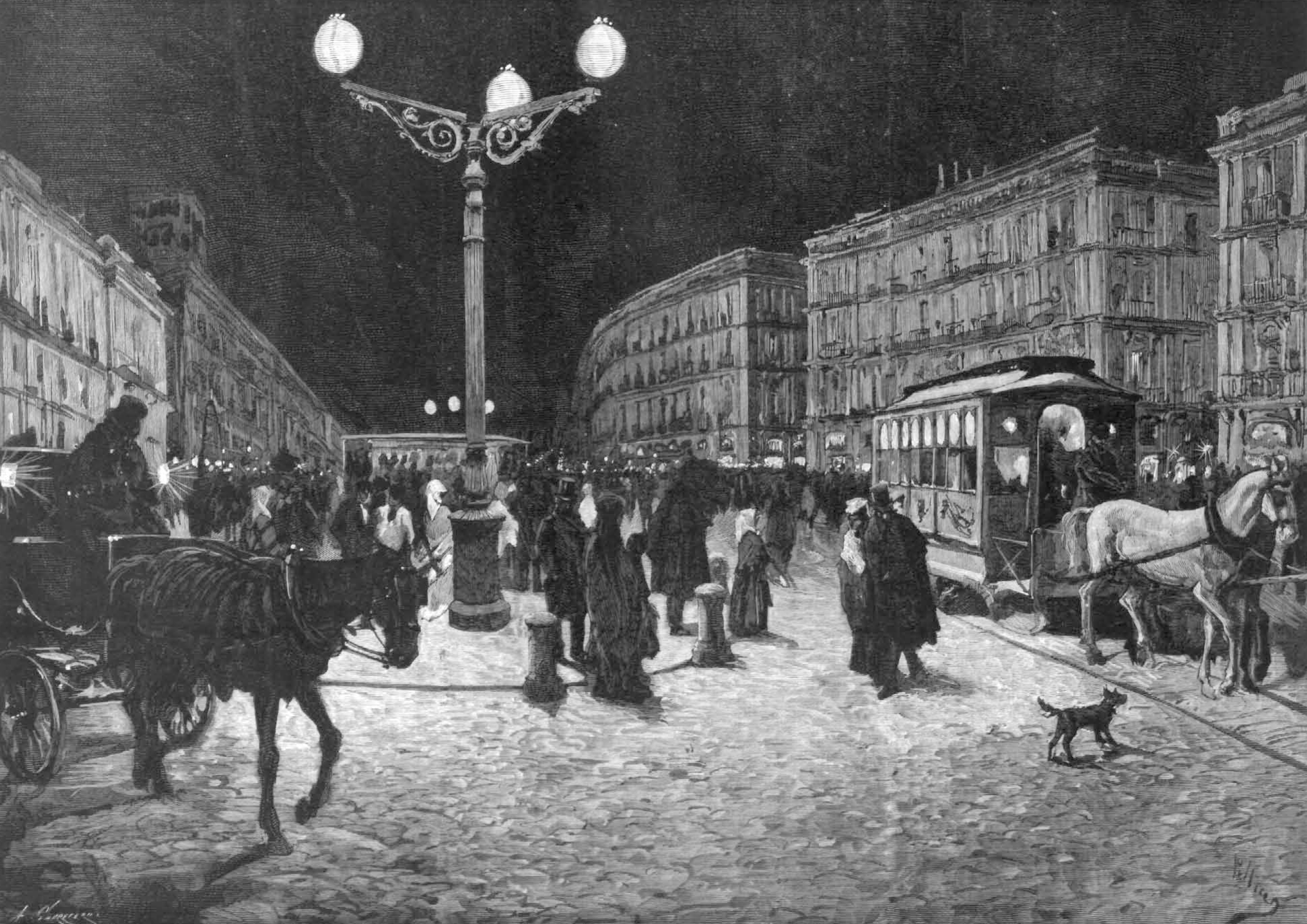
"The Puerta del Sol illuminated with electric light" (La Ilustración Española y Americana, 1878). Engraving by Arturo Carretero from a drawing by Josep Lluís Pellicer.

In 1875 the first streetlight was installed in Puerta del Sol, "very intense but flickering" in the words of Ramón Gómez de la Serna. In November 1881 the total number of gas lanterns (reverberation lanterns, also known as fernandinos), including the seasonal ones, was 6562 square meters, but electric lighting had already been introduced in Puerta del Sol. In 1894, when the Count of Romanones was mayor, the electric arc lanterns were installed. In this area, and in the adjacent Calle de Sevilla, half a hundred street lamps were about to be installed, which were expected to be lit until one o'clock in the morning.

== New means of transportation ==
The population of Madrid underwent strong growth throughout the nineteenth century. In addition, new populations were agglomerated in the future urban planning that will be known as the Ensanche Madrileño. The appearance of new means of transport, such as the steam locomotive, attracted many visitors. On February 9, 1851, the first railroad station in Madrid was inaugurated under the name of Estación del Mediodía ("Midday station", currently Atocha station). The history of Madrid's streetcars dates back to the end of the nineteenth century, and was considered a popular means of transport and an alternative to automobiles.

=== First streetcars ===
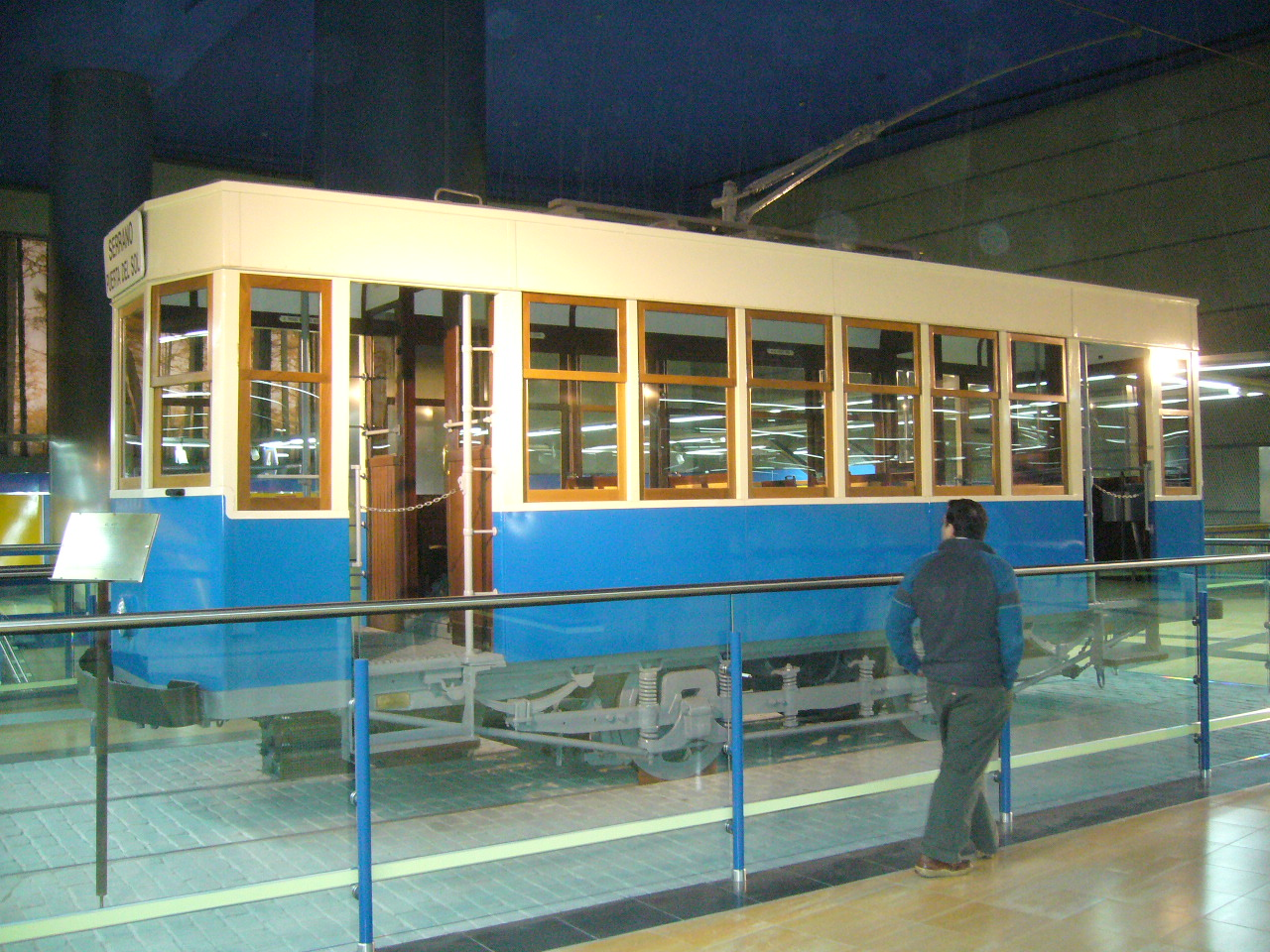
Madrid streetcar of type 477, on display at Pinar de Chamartín Station. It dates from the early 1940s.

The first streetcars were pulled by animals. The first line, Sol-Salamanca, was inaugurated on May 31, 1871 with the participation of the promoter of the idea, the Marquis of Salamanca José de Salamanca y Mayol, who would operate The Madrid Street Tramway Co. There were discussions about whether to call them tranvías or tram-vías (from tramway). Each imperial carriage was double-decker and carried three mules that acted as tractor animals, although they were reduced to two due to the damage caused by their horseshoes on the Madrid roadway. Soon this first line was extended from Sol to the neighborhood of Las Pozas (located between the streets of Princesa, Alberto Aguilera and Serrano Jover) which was served by vehicles called ripers, which became popular with the name of Ripers de Oliva (Oliva ripers) due to its builder: Oliva. Other lines were immediately opened to stations or markets. The first line was later electrified and extended in 1898. For some time ripers coexisted with electric streetcars. The appearance of electric trams with trolley cars dates back to 1906. At first the streetcars were taken from any position in the square, but, as the population grew, the crowds made safe access to them impracticable. It was then that metal railings, popularly known as parallel railings, were installed so that passengers could wait in orderly fashion for the arrival of the streetcars. This system had little success and was dismantled over the decades. On July 10, 1906, a night service was established from Puerta del Sol, starting at nine o'clock at night.

Between 1920 and 1933 the Sociedad Madrileña de Tranvías provided transport service to the capital's tramway network. The streets that had tracks were Alcalá, Montera, Preciados, Mayor and Carretas. Some of the existing vehicles at that time were called "cangrejos" (crabs) due to their red color. From 1924 to 1927 the Sociedad General de Autobuses began to provide service, which operated the first bus network in the capital. In the 1930s the Puerta del Sol was collapsed by the number of streetcars circulating. This situation was due to the fact that a large part of the network had its terminus in the square itself. There were even important tramway traffic jams that, at times, reached almost to Cibeles. During the Civil War the problem disappeared due to the conflict, but it arose again in the post-war period and the bus was thought of as a possible solution. In 1947 the Empresa Municipal de Transportes, or EMT, was created, which in a few years came to control all public bus transport in the city. The EMT carried out a reorganization of lines with the aim of freeing the permanent congestion suffered by the Puerta del Sol, which continued to be the nerve center of the network despite the fact that the three sections of the Gran Vía were already open. Slowly, the streetcars were abandoning the Puerta until, in 1949, the last one circulated. At this time began the slow decline of the tramway and in 1972 the last of them circulated through the streets of Madrid.

=== Arrival of the metro ===
The annals tell that, in 1913, the engineer Carlos Mendoza y Sáez de Argandoña, waiting for a tramway at Puerta del Sol, realized the real need to create an underground railway line. In 1914 he began to draw up the designs together with two other engineers, Alfredo Moreno Osorio and Antonio González Echarte, in the engineering office known as Mengemor. The project included a stretch of three and a half kilometers from Sol to the neighborhood of Cuatro Caminos and among which eight stations were distributed. The first works of excavation of galleries began in June 1917 at Puerta del Sol and in the direction of Red de San Luis. The tunnels were drilled by surface mining methods in the area of the square, while the section running along Calle Montera was done by the Belgian method (nowadays called the classic Madrid method). This made transit through the square and surrounding streets impossible while the works were in progress for a couple of years.

Sol Station was one of the first stations of the Madrid Metro. Line 1 came into operation on October 17, 1919, at three o'clock in the afternoon before a procession attended by Alfonso XIII. On October 31 it went into operation for the public, making possible since then the first section of the subway in the city between Sol and Cuatro Caminos at a depth of approximately thirteen meters. Subsequently, the network was extended to Puente de Vallecas, Ventas and Quevedo stations (extended to Cuatro Caminos). In the same year, the first cinema in Spain was projected in the Carrera de San Jerónimo.

The success of this means of transport meant that a year later the mayor of Madrid, Ramón Rivero de Miranda, inaugurated the Sol-Ventas line and in 1921 the Sol-Atocha section. In addition to the three metro exits, a pavilion by Antonio Palacios was placed in the center of the Puerta de Sol, a work that was demolished in 1934 by an order of the Directorate General of Railways and whose demolition was used to accommodate the connection with line 3. The central pavilion had an interior vestibule of gray and white marble walls, and a high ceramic frieze with the coats of arms in high relief of the Spanish regions.

== Period of Cafés and gatherings ==
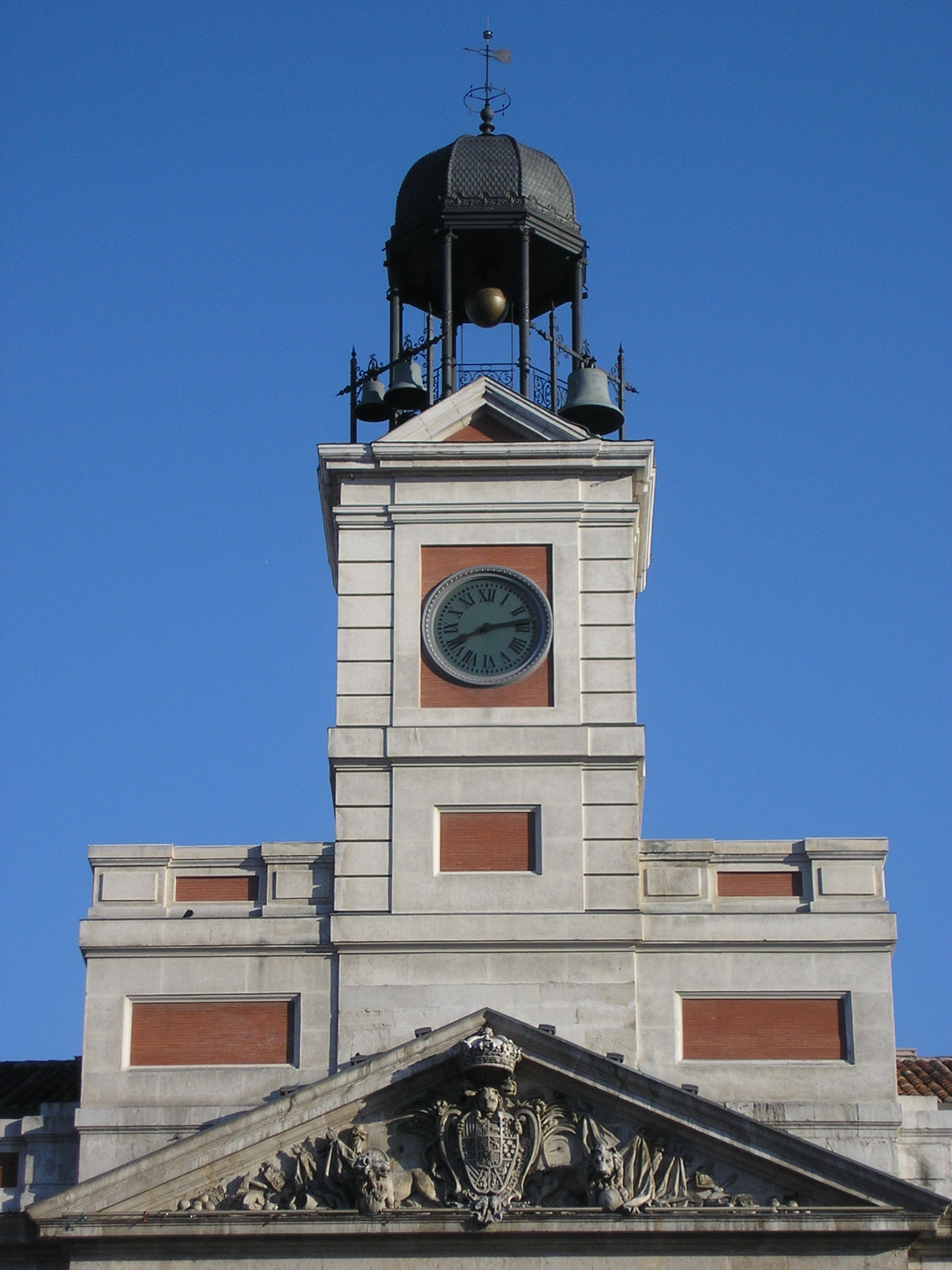
REVISAR Clock

During the period from the mid-nineteenth century to the beginning of the twentieth century, numerous cafés appeared in the area around Puerta del Sol. At its moment of maximum splendor there were almost a dozen cafés. This coincided with a period in the history of Spain called the liberal triennium (1820–1822), in which the cafés multiplied as meeting places for liberals exalted by the political situation of the moment. They served the typical café con media (the "tostada de arriba" as it was also called), which became a classic of the gatherings. The "peñas" and the tertulias were very frequent in the Cafés of the Puerta del Sol. One of the first was the Café Lorencini, a meeting place for the liberals of the Sociedad Patriótica de Amigos de la Libertad (Patriotic Society of Friends of Liberty), characters who launched proclamations on the tables of the premises. This establishment (located in the block between Calle Carretas and Calle Espoz y Mina) was renamed Café de las Columnas, and later Café Puerto Rico. The Café Universal (No. 14) was popularly known as the one with the mirrors. The Café de Levante, the first of them located on the first floor of No. 10, was located near Calle de Alcalá, in front of the former Iglesia del Buen Suceso, and was a place where chess and backgammon were played. It was the most discreet of the Cafés of the Puerta del Sol. The Café de Correos was full of officials of the time; in 1895 the soldiers returning from the colony of Cuba gathered on its sidewalk, which is why it was called the sidewalk of the repatriated. The Café Lisboa had been installed on the first floor of the Casa Cordero (next to the Calle Mayor) and was later called the Café del Comercio; Jacinto Benavente had his gatherings there.

The Café Imperial, located on the block between Carrera de San Jerónimo and Calle de Alcalá, was one of the greatest cafés of nineteenth century Madrid. It was later renamed Café de la Montaña, famous in 1899 for being the café where Ramón María del Valle-Inclán lost an arm in a dispute with the journalist Manuel Bueno. On Calle de Alcalá, next to the doors of the Café de la Montaña, was the chocolate shop of Doña Mariquita, famous for its chocolates with mojicones. All these cafés were visited in 1879 by a dog that became very popular at that time: the Perro Paco. Perro Paco was the subject of numerous newspaper articles during the 1880s, he slept in the Café de Fornos (a café on Calle de Alcalá that was famous for never closing) and suffered a tragic end in a bullfight. The Café Oriental was located on the first floor of the Hotel de la Paix, that is, on Calle Preciados. The Café Colonial, where Rubén Darío was a regular in 1905, was later one of the gathering places of the Generation of '98.

Apart from the Cafés, the renovations of the Puerta del Sol gave way to the proliferation of commercial premises. One of the best known is La Pajarita, located at number five and inaugurated by Vicente Sola in 1852. This store offered candies flavored with various essences, and its wrappers showed the image of a paper bow tie. Later, in 1915, the store La Violeta opened in the nearby Plaza de Canalejas, offering a more specific type of candy called violets. Violets have become over time a symbol of typical Madrid confectionery. In 1894 the Mallorcan Juan Ripoll opened the pastry shop and tea room (initially a place for social gatherings) that would later add aroma to the square: La Mallorquina, the only nineteenth-century establishment that remains today in Puerta del Sol and in its original function.

Another well-known candy shop in the nineteenth century was the Flor de Lis, located at No. 10 and Nos. 11 and 13 Calle Peligros. The Trust Joyero Internacional (International Jeweler's Trust) was located at no. 12. The social environment of the Puerta del Sol at the beginning of the twentieth century caused the spread of swindles, such as the burial swindle or the Portuguese swindle, and many foreign visitors from the provinces (called catetos in popular parlance) fell into the nets of these swindlers.

The disappearance of the Cafés was progressive after the Civil War and with it the shops that provided newspapers to the old tertulianos settled on the sidewalks, recalling in their shops the names of the old cafés: Puerto Rico, De la Montaña, etc.

== Gobernación clock ==
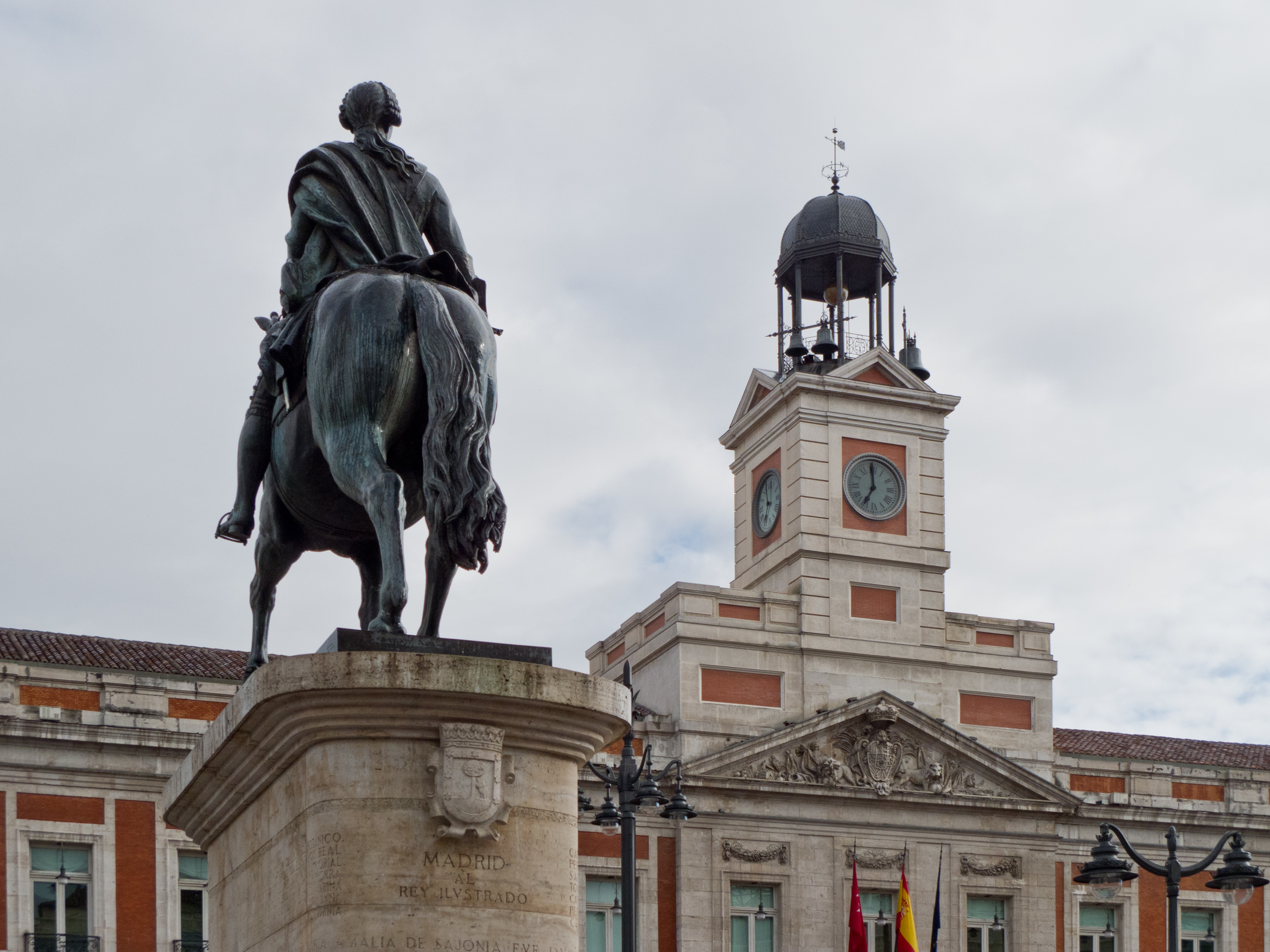
The equestrian statue of Charles III in front of the current clock.

At the end of the nineteenth century, knowing the exact time in any place was something reserved for wealthy people who owned a clock; for the rest of the people it was enough to hear the chimes, or the chiming of a distant tower clock. Since the eighteenth century the Iglesia del Buen Suceso had a primitive tower clock on its façade (it can be seen in the illustrations of the time), which regulated with its only hand the transit of stagecoaches and post office posts. It was a very inaccurate clock, with antiquated machinery, and with only one hand on its dial it indicated the time approximately. The protests of the Madrilenians were growing due to the constant stops of the clock and the situation caused a new mechanism to be ordered in 1848 that did not satisfy the public either.

When the Iglesia del Buen Suceso was demolished in 1854, a tower clock made by Tomás de Miguel was installed on the upper façade of the Gobernación building, which had a minute hand. This new clock had three dials. Its appearance was striking but it was still not very accurate and sometimes showed a different time on each of the three dials. A popular saying went: "No one will be dissatisfied (...) everyone can choose the one that suits him best". With the renovation of the square in 1860, a ball was added to the clock that fell at noon, which was called the bola electrica. The malfunctioning of this first clock is evident in the well-known epigram of the time:

This fatal clock, which is at the Puerta del Sol

said a Spaniard to a Turk,

Why is it always so bad?

The Turk answered like an old dog:

this clock is the mirror of the government underneath.

— Anonymous

The situation of this third clock changed when in 1866 the famous Spanish clockmaker Losada installed a new one with a precision unknown until that time. Its twelve chimes at the end of the year would resound throughout Spain. As for the previous clock, it was thought to be placed in the Casa de la Panadería but finally ended up in the Almacén General de la Villa.

=== "Losada Clock" ===
In 1863, the watchmaker José Rodríguez Losada (known as Losada), who had built precision marine chronometers for the Navy, decided to meet with the municipal authorities of the time and offered to donate free of charge a new and more accurate clock to replace the old and inaccurate Gobernación clock. It took three years to build it and finally, on November 19, 1866, the new clock was inaugurated by Isabella II on the occasion of her birthday. The ball that descended at noon sounded a chime; the noon chime was maintained until the 1930s. In 1928, one of the weights came loose and broke through the floor into the governor's main office. The new clock has functioned perfectly and with sufficient accuracy to the present day, chiming at the end of the year. Every year since its placement, about 28 seconds before midnight on December 31, the ball of the clock descends to announce that the year is about to end; then the four-quarters and then the 12 chimes sound. Each chime has a cadence of three seconds. In 1941 Radio Nacional de España provided the time signals with the sound of the bells of the Gobernación clock, in many of the spoken newspapers of Radio Nacional de España began with indications to the time references of this clock. In 1952 the Venezuelan ambassador, through a proposal of the Caracas City Council, made an offer to the Madrid City Council to buy the clock, but finally an agreement was not reached.

=== New Year's Eve grapes ===
The Gobernación clock already had another utility apart from providing the exact time to the people of Madrid, and it was slowly gaining national prominence. The Madrid press already commented in January 1897: "It is a Madrilenian custom to eat Twelve Grapes at twelve o'clock on the clock that separates the outgoing from the incoming year", and it is possible that at that time the tradition was not very widespread. The following year the press encouraged this tradition with an article entitled "Las Uvas milagrosas" (The miraculous grapes). Although some date it back to 1880, it is clear that the tradition has been documented since December 1897, setting in December 1896 the certain beginning of the tradition of eating twelve grapes to the rhythm of the twelve chimes of the Puerta del Sol clock.

Another explanation mentions that in the fall of 1909 there would have been a great harvest of grapes throughout the country, and this caused that to increase consumption, bunches of grapes were given to the New Year's attendees present at the Puerta del Sol. This legend says that someone had the idea of taking one grape for each chime of the Gobernación clock. On the north façade of Puerta del Sol (number fourteen), the Gran Hotel Universo had opened in 1898, the place where the tradition that would later become so popular among Spaniards began. Among the anecdotes of the 1930 New Year's Eve street celebrations is the one starring Alfonso XIII who, incognito, celebrated among the crowd. The first chimes were televised in December 1962, and since then they have never stopped being rebroadcast, giving for a few minutes a moment of prominence to the Puerta del Sol.

== 20th century ==
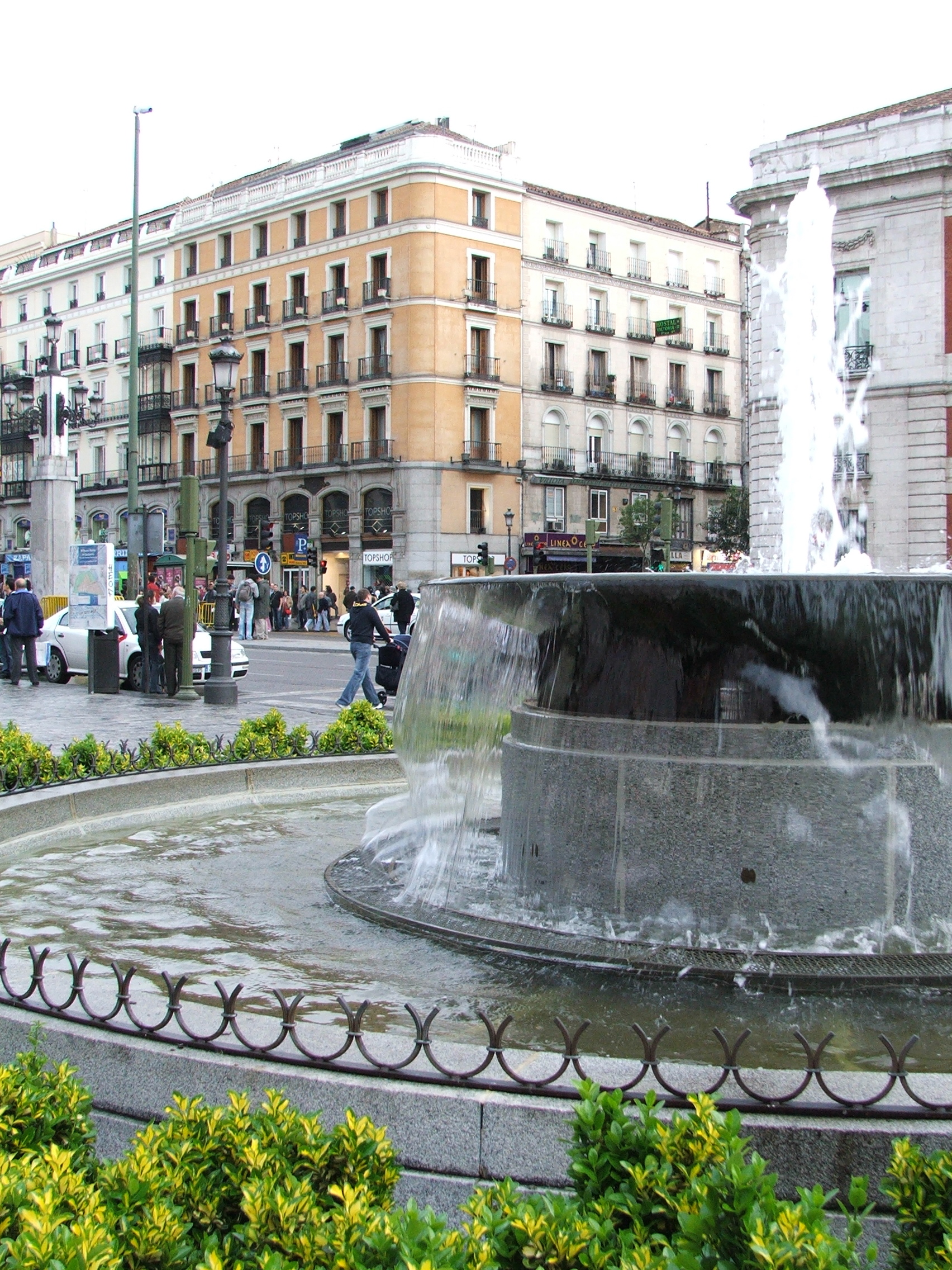
View of the entrance to Calle Carretas through one of its two fountains.

The Puerta del Sol gained prominence in 1906, as it was the year of royal weddings: in January the Infanta Maria Teresa married her first cousin Ferdinand of Bavaria. The news of the engagement of Alfonso XIII to Princess Victoria Eugenia of Battenberg (granddaughter of Queen Victoria of England), who in Spain would be known by her first two names: Victoria Eugenia, also reached Madrid.

The Puerta del Sol became at the beginning of the century a vindictive icon of the political life of the country, due to its location halfway between the Palacio de las Cortes de España (Palace of the Spanish Cortes) and the Royal Palace of Madrid.

A small store called El Corte Inglés, located on Calle Preciados on the corner of Calle del Carmen and Calle de Rompelanzas, dedicated to tailoring and dressmaking for children, began its activity. It had already been founded in 1890 and enjoyed a certain prestige. In the mid-twentieth century this store, converted into a department store, would undergo a commercial expansion along the northern area of the Puerta del Sol. At the end of the 19th century, one of the most important commercial centers was the Union Bazaar located in the Casa Cordero. In 1911 a Universal Eucharistic Congress was held and its celebrations took place in the Puerta del Sol. In 1913 the Palacio de Oñate, located on Calle Mayor, was demolished.

The future monarch Alfonso XIII, in his childhood, and his mother, the queen regent Maria Christina, had an anecdote that would give rise to a popular children's story and tradition. When Alfonso was eight years old, a baby tooth fell out and this event worried him a lot, so much so that his mother commissioned Father Luis Coloma to write a story to reassure him. Coloma wrote a story about an imaginary mouse called Ratoncito Pérez who lived in a big box of cookies in the warehouse of the Prats candy shop (located at number 8, Calle Arenal, very close to Puerta del Sol), and who collected the children's teeth under a pillow. This little story, which later became so popular, reassured the child king Alfonso XIII.

On November 12, 1912, Senator José Canalejas, on his way to the Senate, was assassinated by three shots in front of the Librería San Martín by an anarchist. This bookstore was located in the southern area of Puerta del Sol, and today there is a plaque commemorating this event. In that same year, the writer Ramón Gómez de la Serna established in one of the access streets to the Puerta del Sol a famous gathering in the Café Pombo: The "sacred crypt of Pombo".

The writer Ramón del Valle Inclán (a regular at the Cafés of the Puerta del Sol) wrote a play in 1928 entitled Luces de Bohemia, in which part of the situations (starring Max Estrella) take place in the Puerta del Sol and its surroundings. In 1929 Francisco Elías directed the first Spanish sound film, El misterio de la Puerta del Sol, in which the hustle and bustle of the Puerta del Sol can be seen (and heard) . Due to its technical errors it was a failure from an economic point of view, so its importance is historical and documentary.

Many of the revolutionary celebrations of the time are echoed in the Puerta del Sol. That same year the National Telephone Company of Spain was born and the first telegraph tower was installed in Casa Cordero. On September 13, 1923, martial law was proclaimed in Puerta del Sol and other places in Madrid, which initiated the dictatorship of Miguel Primo de Rivera.

From this period at the beginning of the 20th century, there are details in the literature about the popularity of the Corpus Christi procession in Madrid, which had its main route in the Puerta del Sol and in some of its main streets (Calle Carretas and Carrera de San Jerónimo). The procession was multitudinous and the great affluence of people gave business to the water carriers, who served water from the fountains with aniseed aromas. Another religious procession that made its entrance in the Puerta is that of Good Friday (called "del Santo Entierro"). These processions had their period of concealment during the Second Republic. From the same, in its condition of passage between Cañadas Reales, every year in September the arrival of the cattle from the grazing areas was celebrated, claiming the rural past.

=== Second Republic and Civil War ===
On April 14, 1931, the proclamation of the Second Spanish Republic took place, and the Puerta del Sol witnessed the change of power and the popular celebrations for the proclamation of the Republic; many Madrilenians came to the Plaza to celebrate and learn about the event. The crowd was so large that the members of the provisional government who were approaching by car to the Casa de Correos (Gobernación) had to make the trip from Puerta de Alcalá to Puerta del Sol in two hours, and when they arrived at the main doors of Gobernación they were met by civil guards who, hesitating, did not allow them to pass. Maura shouted: "Gentlemen, give pass to the government of the Republic!" and, just at that moment, from one of the balconies waved the Republican flag (waved by Rafael Sánchez Guerra and Manuel Ossorio Florit). In 1934, when Alejandro Lerroux went to the Casa de Correos to declare the state of war, there was a shooting without consequences in the middle of Puerta del Sol. The Puerta del Sol would become the nerve center of celebrations and protests during the Republic, acquiring the image of a place of popular vindication. During the Republican period, the so-called red sidewalk was established from Alcalá to Montera. This sidewalk was a meeting and strolling place for supporters of the Republic.

During the beginnings of the uprising of July 17–18, 1936, which turned into the Civil War, Madrid fell under the Republican faction, and soon (November 6, 1936) the battle of Madrid began. Already in the initial advance to the capital from the south of Spain, General Franco and Mola ordered their forces to take the offensive against the capital; the evolution was so fast that they declared a few days later that "they will have coffee in the Puerta del Sol next week". The resistance in the area of the University City prevented the assault on the capital. Later the battle of Jarama paralyzed a broad front and definitely delayed the initial plans to invade the capital. Madrid maintained its resistance until 1939. During the first aerial bombardments carried out in December, the Puerta del Sol suffered part of the destruction of its setts and some surrounding houses due to the explosion of several bombs (bombings of November 9 and 10). Of the subsequent air raids, one of the most serious for the Plaza was the one carried out on November 17, 1936, in which a bomb exploded on the corner with Calle de Alcalá, opening a crater of twenty meters in diameter and fifteen meters deep; its momentum was such that it lifted the rails of the subway and brought them to the surface. The intense violence of the air attacks was diminishing in the first days of December, and later the artillery attacks from the artillery batteries located in the Casa de Campo (in its highest elevation, called Cerro Garabitas) were increasing. These artillery bombardments meant that the Puerta del Sol area was within artillery range and was frequently affected by the explosion of various 155 millimeter shells (the neighboring Gran Vía was known during the war as "the Avenue of the fifteen and a half" due to the frequency of impacts of that caliber). The Puerta del Sol was not spared from these bombardments of the fifteen and a half, and was affected daily by the artillery of the rebel troops. The year 1936 ended with the bombardment of the Puerta del Sol, in which the artillerymen of Garabitas launched, during the chimes of midnight on New Year's Eve, twelve projectiles on the Puerta del Sol.

The appearance of Puerta del Sol during the conflict was similar to that of other areas attacked in the center of Madrid, demolished houses, damaged facades, craters in the streets, disorder of urban furniture. This situation was also shared with the neighborhood of Argüelles. In one of the aerial bombardments, one of the dials of the Gobernación clock was damaged by a projectile and later popular collections were made for its restoration. On April 1 Franco signed the last report of war ending the war, and his troops entered and occupied the Puerta del Sol. The post-war period began and the consequent restoration of the damage caused by the conflict on this place, as well as the surrounding buildings.

=== Post-War Period ===
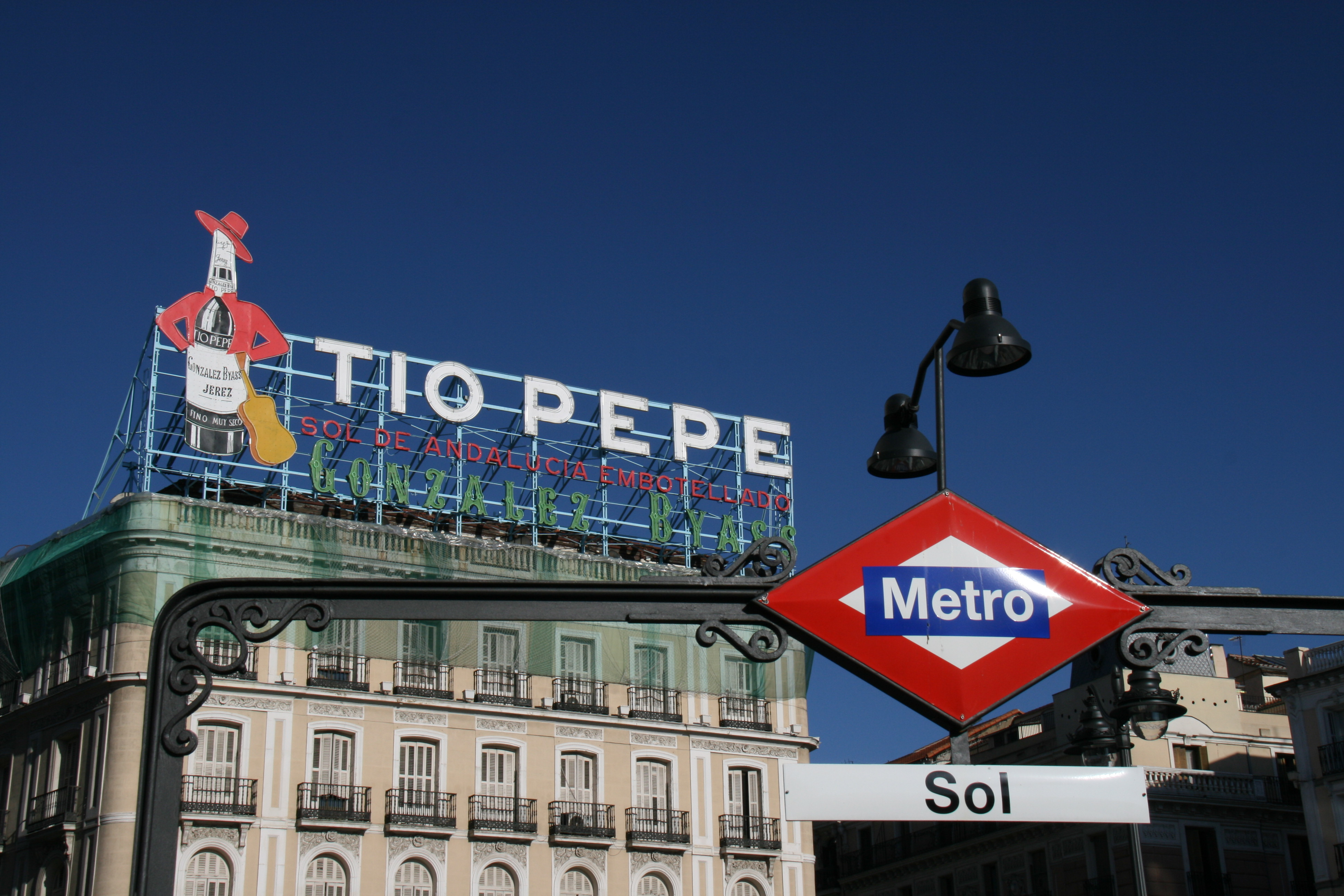
The "Tío Pepe" illuminated sign, placed in the 1960s, was one of many illuminated signs placed in the same location.

As soon as it was occupied by Franco's troops, the military authorities considered it necessary to change the physical landscape of Madrid as part of the general process of "cleansing" the moral and political life of the country. The new Franco regime associated Puerta del Sol with the defunct Republic and revolutionary movements, as it had been a traditional meeting point for the left. Already on May 19, 1939, the Minister of Home Affairs (and brother-in-law of the dictator) Serrano Suñer held talks with the consistory to discuss the reconstruction of the capital; during the subsequent press conference, he stated that the aim was to "put an end to the tragic Spanishness of the decadent and traditional Madrid, although the Puerta del Sol and the building of Gobernación, which is a breeding ground for the worst political germs, must disappear". On July 7, 1939, the pro-Nazi newspaper Informaciones expressed its satisfaction with the apparent loss of popularity of this square among the popular classes of Madrid. As part of this plan, the architect Antonio Palacios came to design an elevated platform with a double floor of reinforced glass in the middle of the square, with capacity for 52,000 people, but the great projects to create a completely new imperial Madrid would not be realized for economic reasons, limited to a purification of names in streets and buildings made in April 1939 to exalt the heroes of the recent Crusade (Avenida del Generalísimo Franco, Avenida de José Antonio).

During this post-war period, in the midst of Franco's dictatorship, the southern building known as Corres is used as police headquarters and the General Directorate of State Security (Spanish: Dirección General de Seguridad del Estado, DGSE). The basements were filled with socialist and communist prisoners who had been arrested by police officers. Some of these prisoners were held in the cellars for a period of seventy-two hours without charges being brought against them. Also after the Civil War, the department store El Corte Inglés acquired a property at Calle Preciados #3: it was a multi-storey building dedicated to specific sales. Shopping centers increased their presence and some of them appeared in the streets near Puerta del Sol: Almacenes Arias (Saldos Arias), Galerías Preciados, Bazar de la Unión (from 1958 the premises became a self-service store called Tobogán), etc. Different lottery sellers, newspaper shops, shoeshiners, etc. are scattered.

In 1950, the municipal architect Herrero de Palacios directs a renovation of the Puerta del Sol to renew the street furniture of the square. The political regime established by Franco watched over the area and prevented it from being a meeting place; it is for this reason that Luis Moya in 1962 states that "the political function of the Puerta del Sol ended in 1936 (...) it is now a discreet central square, with a circulation suited to its size, with gardens and fountains, with stores and offices...".

There is a dispute between literary and urbanistic, which begins with Fernández de los Ríos stating that the Puerta del Sol has ceased to be the center of the Villa in favor of the Gran Vía. This dispute was taken to court because the "center" served as a reference in the calculation of distances for the installation of gas stations within a radius of fifteen kilometers of towns with more than fifty thousand inhabitants. Estaciones de Servicio San Fernando was the plaintiff. Finally, the Supreme Court, in a 1967 ruling by endorsement of the Madrid City Council, confirmed that the center of Madrid is the Puerta del Sol.

Some of the streetcar lines passing through the center were dismantled, especially those running from Calle de Alcalá. This dismantling operation directed by the municipal architect Manuel Herrero de Palacios facilitated the traffic through Puerta del Sol. In 1950, a horizontal plaque was placed on the ground in front of the main door of the Edificio de Gobernación, representing the famous Kilometer Zero, the origin of the six radial roads leaving the Capital. It became a meeting place and meeting point. This geographical center was recalculated in 1978 and located again behind the Prado Museum. From the same period dates the measure of 635.50 meters above mean sea level in Alicante, a measure that serves to trace the changes in the meter. In the sixties it became fashionable to place a large illuminated Christmas tree in the center of the Plaza. In the renovation of the Purta (the mayor was Moreno Torres) in 1951 two twin fountains are placed, popularly known as "El dos de oros" or "Los ceniceros" ("The two of gold" or "The ashtrays"), both the work of Herrero de Palacios.

In the sixties the daily flow of people along the Puerta del Sol leads Rafael García Serrano to mention that it "dumps like a pot" people towards the Plaza de Oriente, from Calle de Carretas, Espoz y Mina, Alcalá, Calle del Carmen, del Correo and Montera: all provide people to the door. Calle Mayor and Carrera de San Jerónimo do not contribute to the net flow. In 1951 trolleybuses replaced electric streetcars at Puerta del Sol, although streetcars continued to run in Madrid until the 1960s. For the first time the Cavalcade of Magi is established. Slowly, the hotels installed in the last century disappear, the premises are acquired to create shopping centers, boarding houses and offices, hardly any housing. The abundant advertisements that surrounded the balconies of the Puerta del Sol, which were so popular in the post-war period, are progressively eliminated. One of the advertisements was finally saved from this elimination, the luminous advertisement of "Tío Pepe" (named after José Ángel de la Peña, a relative of the founder of González Byass), due to an economic impediment: the high cost of its removal. This situation made this poster, which shows a bottle of sherry designed by Luis Pérez Solero (a bottle dressed in a jacket, a guitar and a hat), become a modern symbol of Puerta de Sol. The sign remained in place, and in the eighties it was decided to keep it (along with the Schweppes illuminated sign in the Edificio Carrión), thanks to a popular vote that decided to keep them in place.

The retransmission of the twelve bells, which until then was only followed by radio, began on Televisión Española in 1962. For many years, especially when there were only two public television channels, they were televised from the Puerta del Sol in Madrid, except for those of 1973, which were broadcast from Barcelona. The Puerta del Sol clock continues with the same annual ritual: 35 seconds before twelve o'clock, a ball at the top of the clock descends, sounding a chime. Then four double bells ring, representing the four quarters, and finally, at twelve o'clock, the twelve chimes begin, one every three seconds approximately.

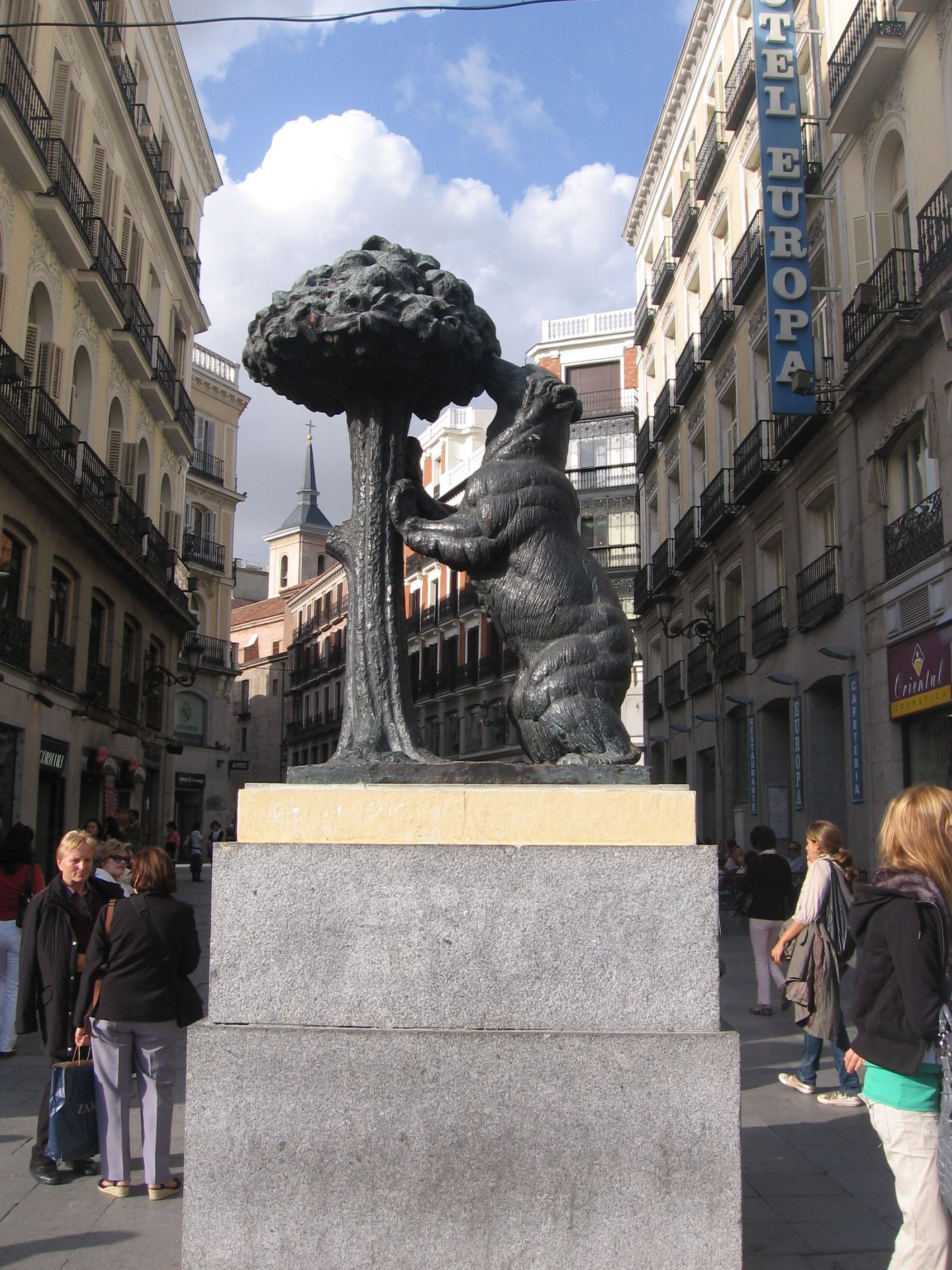
Statue of the Bear and the Strawberry Tree, placed in the square in 1967

In 1967 a statue of four meters high was placed in the square with the figure of the Bear and the Strawberry Tree, a work by the sculptor Antonio Navarro Santafé. The statue placed in the entrance area of Calle de Alcalá represents the heraldic symbols of Madrid. This statue will be placed in various locations in the square throughout history. At that time the streets used to offer numerous hot dog stands. Slowly the cafés of tertulia would disappear from the center of Madrid. One of the last cafés in Puerta del Sol was the Café Universal (also known as the Café de los Espejos), which finally closed its doors on January 9, 1974.

On September 13, 1974 ETA-V Assembly commits the attack of the Calle del Correo, adjacent to the government building: a bomb explodes at noon in the Rolando cafeteria and causes twelve deaths and more than seventy wounded. In 1986, the facades of the buildings (in a total of fourteen buildings) of the Puerta del Sol are remodeled. The illumination installed by the City Council was designated by the people of Madrid as a phallic forest.

In the midst of La Movida Madrileña, the pop music group Mecano issued a single entitled Un año más in which they dedicated a song to the chimes and the twelve grapes of New Year's Eve. During 1986 some aesthetic renovations were carried out in the square: Javier Ortega and Antonio Rivière were in charge of them, under the supervision of Antón Capitel. The twin fountains that were placed in the previous renovations in 1950 were moved to Paseo de García Lorca, in Vallecas, and were replaced by others, built by Ángel Rivière Gómez and Jaime Ortega Vidal. Mayor Enrique Tierno Galván returns the statue of the Mariblanca to Puerta del Sol and places it in the middle of a superficial bus stop. It is decided to close successively some streets to the traffic: one of the first is Calle Preciados, then Calle del Carmen and finally Calle Montera. The Puerta becomes a collection point for the blood bank that is periodically set up in the area.

== 21st century ==
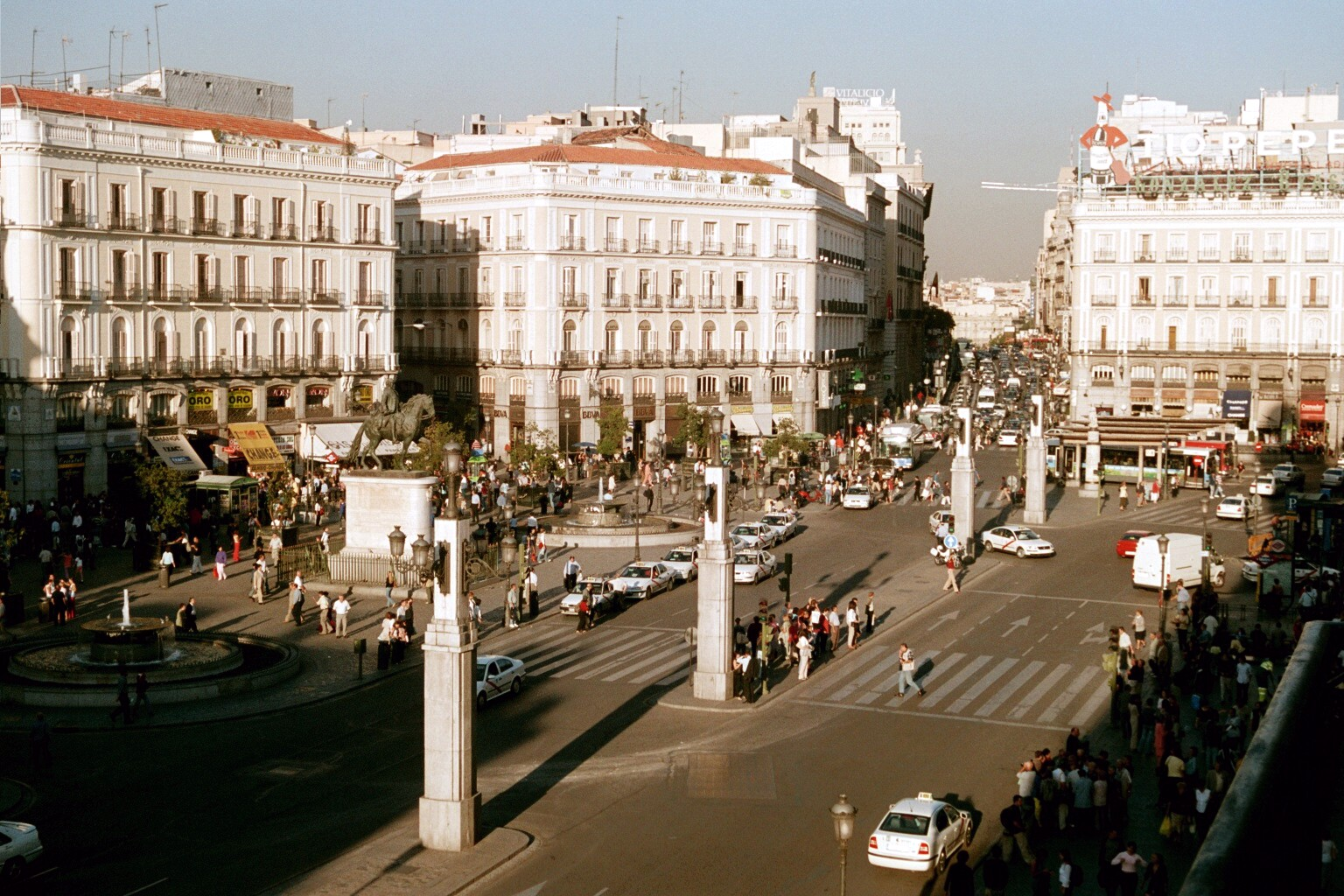
Puerta del Sol before the 2005 remodeling. You can see the "controversial" lampposts that the people of Madrid called "suppositories".

One of the figures that decorate the Puerta del Sol today is the equestrian statue of Charles III, which was placed in 1994 almost in the center of the square. It is a bronze reproduction by Miguel Angel Rodriguez and Eduardo Zancada of a work by Juan Pascual de Mena preserved in the Real Academia de Bellas Artes de San Fernando (Royal Academy of Fine Arts of San Fernando); its final location was submitted to popular vote. Among the sites in Puerta del Sol that have become meeting places, one of the most popular is kilometer zero. The popularity of this meeting point makes that in 2000 a film was shot on the theme Km. 0. In 2002 becomes famous cultural tour known as La Noche de Max Estrella, which passes through the Puerta del Sol. In 2006 the Hotel Paris closes for good.

In memory of the victims of the March 11, 2004, attacks and the people who collaborated in the rescue operations after the catastrophe, a marble plaque was placed on the façade of the Correos building. In May 2006, as a result of works to improve the access to the Metro station, the remains of the Iglesia del Buen Suceso were discovered. The remains found correspond to the foundations of the main façade (located just in front of the "Tío Pepe" building) and the side walls. During the excavation, human remains were recovered, possibly from the War of Independence and the executions of May 2. The primitive canalizations of the first locations of the Mariblanca fountain were also investigated.

Puerta del Sol becomes a place of congregation of computer and telecommunications stores. The 101st Apple Store opens at the end of June 2014, occupying part of the building of the former Hotel París, also causing the Tío Pepe ad located on the roof of the building to be placed on the roof of the central building, opposite the Casa de Correos. Vodafone España located a store in the Plaza and achieved through a negotiation with the metropolitan company that the Metro station is called "Vodafone Sol" since June 2013 and for a period of three years.

=== The renovation ===
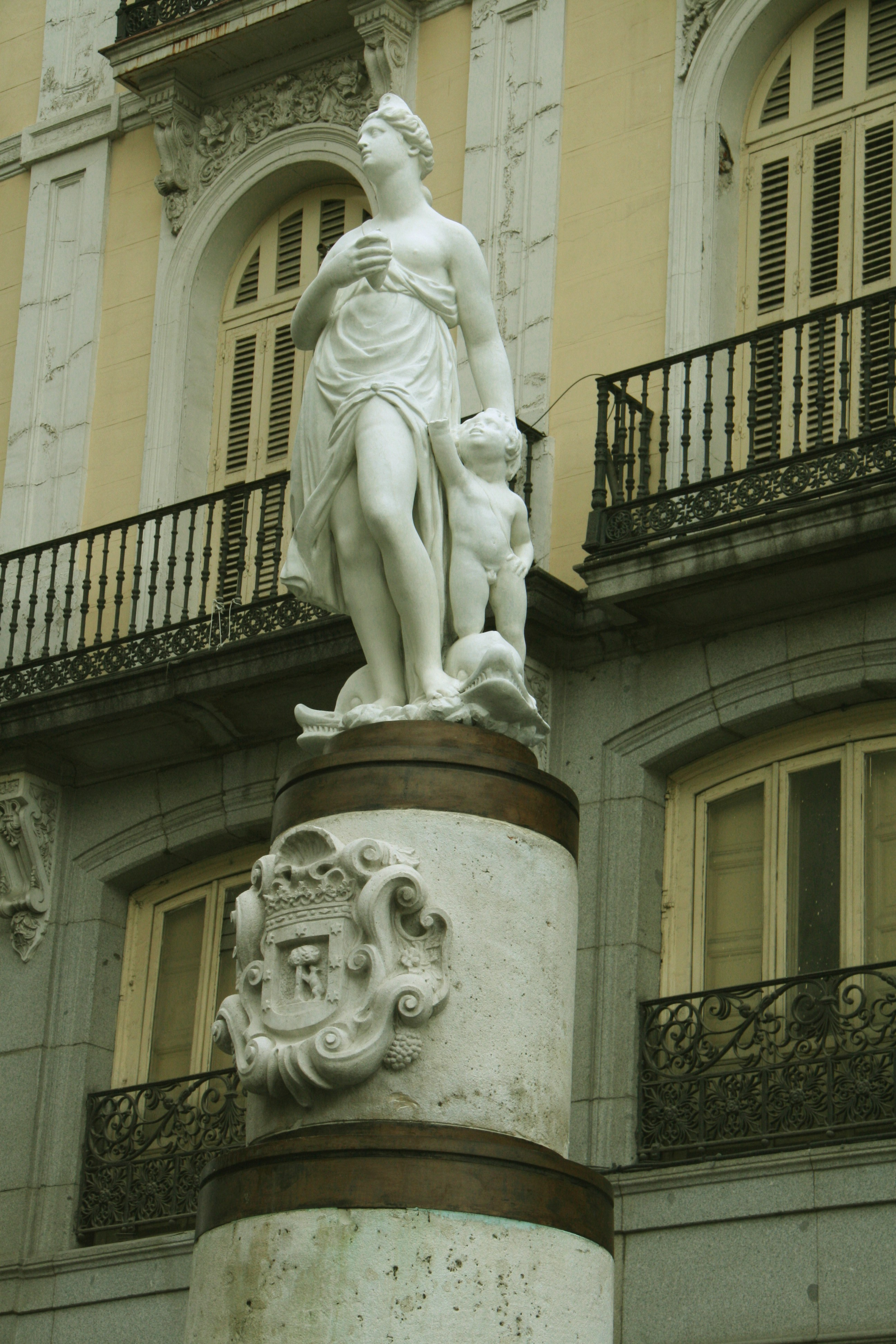
The statue of the Mariblanca in its current location

The second remodeling of Puerta del Sol began in 2005 and was completed in June 2009. The objectives of the works were to increase the pedestrian area (allowing a redistribution of the central space of the square), reduce road traffic, complete the pedestrianization process of Calle del Arenal and Calle Montera, connect the Metro network with the Cercanías network (affecting the eastern area of the square) and remove the EMT stops (moved to the junction of Sevilla and Alcalá). The connection with Cercanías allowed the construction of a new deep platform and direct connection with Nuevos Ministerios and Atocha stations. The works were assigned to the construction company Sacyr Vallehermoso. During this time, some accesses were closed to traffic and the eastern part of the square was forbidden to pedestrians by a metal fence. The excavation works were carried out to improve the infrastructure of the Metro station, and at the same time to connect Puerta del Sol with the Cercanías network lines. This connection made it possible to go directly from Puerta del Sol to the city's main railway stations: Atocha and Chamartín.

As a result of the works, a new subway station appears on the surface: the pavilion designed by the architect Antonio Fernández Alba, popularly known as the glass igloo. The statue of the Mariblanca is placed again, this time at the head of Calle del Arenal. On September 25, 2009, the location of the Statue of the Bear and the Strawberry Tree is changed from the entrance of Calle del Carmen to the head of Calle de Alcalá, its original location in 1967. The sidewalk on the north side is widened because Arenal, Preciados, Carmen, Montera and Alcalá streets (partially) become pedestrian streets. The access to the square with automobiles is activated only in the axis Calle Mayor-Carrera de San Jerónimo. With this project and the pedestrianization of Plaza de Callao and Calle Preciados, several hundred square meters of roadway are extended in the area. A new subway station is added (three in total). A new plaque commemorating kilometer zero is placed, removing the previous one because it was very worn out. The inauguration of the new Puerta del Sol, on June 27, 2009, brings the renovations to an end.

The renovation operations, which had the noticeable effect of increasing the pedestrian area, did not only affect the surface area of the square (which has remained unchanged since the first widening in 1860). The works also focused on the subsoil of the square. During the execution of the earthworks in the subsoil, the pillars of the Iglesia del Buen Suceso (corresponding to its main façade and the side walls) were discovered by surprise in May 2006. Human remains were also found that were dated to the time of the War of Independence and were possibly burials from the executions of May 2, 1808. This archaeological discovery delayed for a year the completion of the renovation of the Puerta. After its discovery, the stones were dismantled and the remains were replaced at a lower level. The final solution adopted was to build a space dedicated to the archaeological find in the interchange station itself. This space includes the possibility of admiring, inside the Cercanías station, the remains of the pillar of the façade of the Iglesia del Buen Suceso, separated from the public by a large display case.

The old and the new kilometer zero plaque placed in 2009

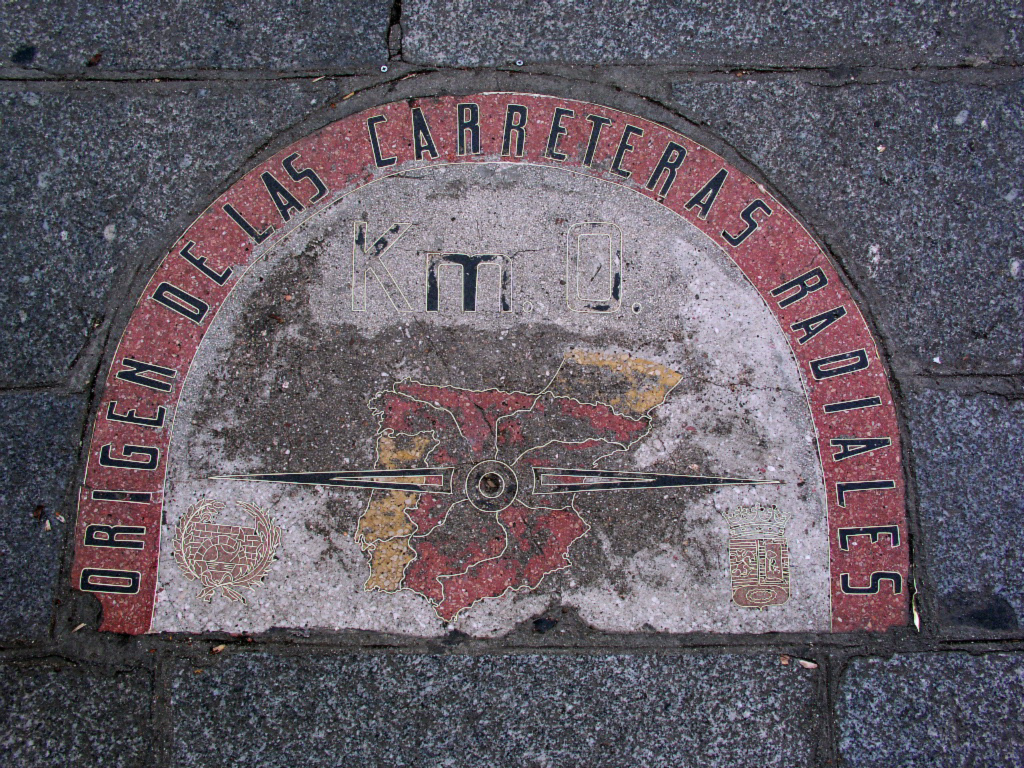
The old plate, worn by the habit of stepping on it

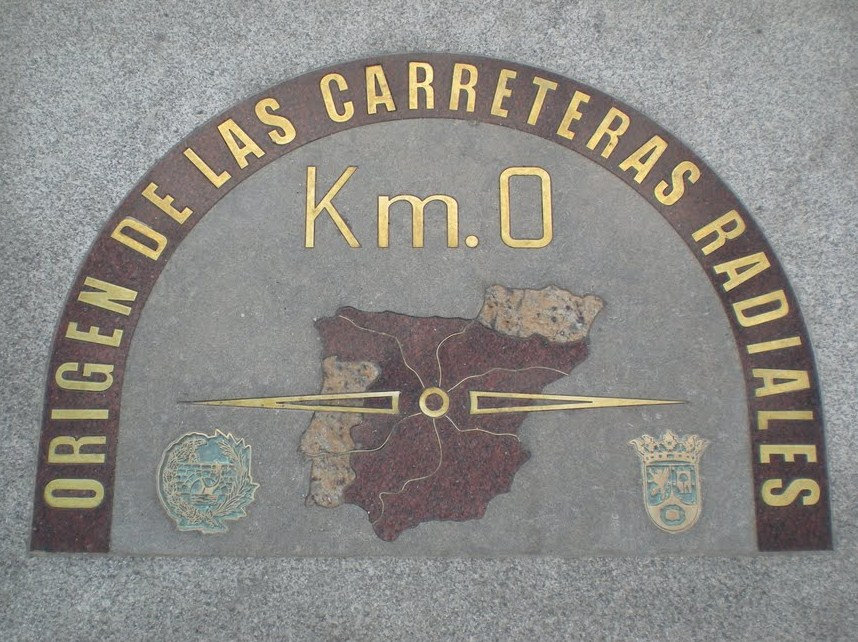
The new plaque, installed in 2009

=== The square after the renovation ===
The renovation left a square with some of the pedestrian streets, and others such as Mayor, Alcalá, Carrera de San Jerónimo and Carretas with restricted automobile circulation. The appearance and renovation of new urban elements after the 2009 renovation, such as the central "igloo" (exit of the interchange), and the return of the statue of the Mariblanca, makes the dating patterns in Puerta del Sol change. The economic crisis causes an abundance of gold buying and selling stores to proliferate, which in turn causes the circulation of various "Human billboard" with flashy vests in search of potential selling clients. The aesthetics and popularity of certain street artists and groups of musicians make that in the space of the square are flourishing various styles.

=== 15-M Movement ===
On May 15, 2011, an event took place that began with a protest called to the platform ¡Democracia Real YA! (Real Democracy NOW!) in which dozens of protesters camped in the square that same night; joined the next day by more people and reaching thousands in the course of the following week. This event would originate the protests against the Spanish political system and the privileges of politicians; demanding a political, social and economic change in Spain. From this square, the revolts spread to other Spanish cities such as: Barcelona, Santa Cruz de Tenerife, Seville, Palma de Mallorca, Valencia, etc. following the example of the capital. The square thus became the symbol of the 15M Movement. After several weeks of camping, nearby merchants began to complain, claiming that their sales were plummeting. On June 19, it was proposed to dissolve it and so most of them left Puerta del Sol. The "indignados" decided to leave the square to mobilize in the streets of Madrid in the form of a protest. But not without leaving a permanent information point in this square. On August 2, the National Police evicted the last campers.

== Bibliography ==
- Alaminos López, Eduardo (1999). Alaminos López, E. (ed.). Estampas de Madrid (in Spanish). Madrid: Museo Municipal de Madrid. ISBN 8478124772.
- Fernández de los Ríos, Ángel (2002) [1876]. Guía de Madrid (in Spanish). Madrid: Edición facsímil de Ediciones La Librería (2002). ISBN 8495889315.
- Gea, María Isabel (2002). Diccionario enciclopédico de Madrid (in Spanish). Madrid: La Librería. ISBN 8495889099.
- Gea, María Isabel (2002). El Madrid desaparecido (in Spanish). Madrid: Ediciones La Librería. ISBN 8495889471.
- Guerra Chavarino, Emilio (2011). Los viajes de agua de Madrid (PDF) (in Spanish). La Librería. ISBN 9788498731194. Archived from the original (PDF) on September 23, 2010.
