= El Corte Inglés =

Spanish department store group

El Corte Inglés, S.A.

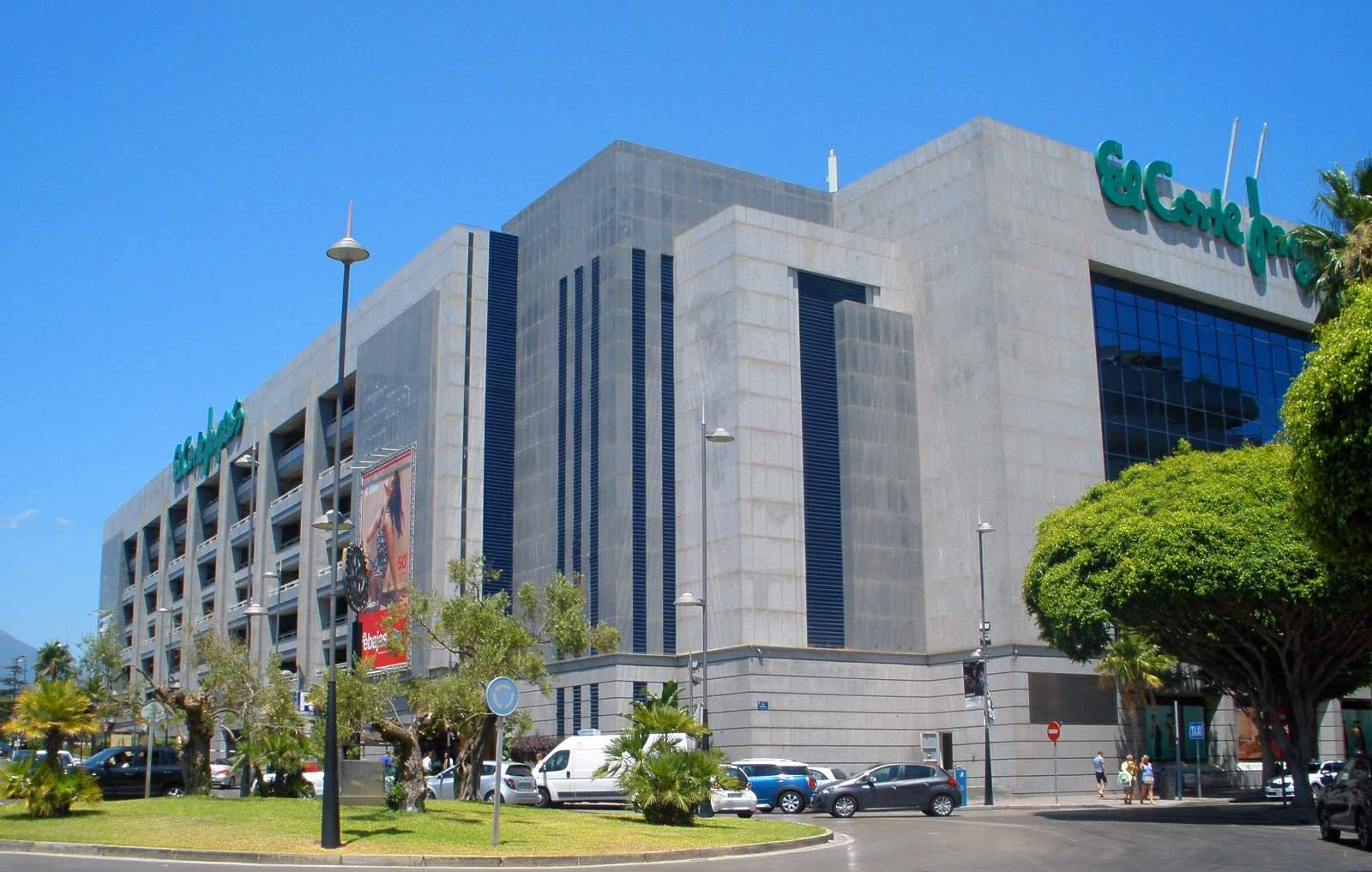
- Exterior of the store in Marbella (2019)
- Type: Private. Sociedad Anónima
- Industry: Retail
- Genre: Department stores
- Founded: 28 June 1940; 86 years ago in Madrid, Spain
- Founders: Ramón Areces; César Rodríguez
- Headquarters: Madrid, Spain
- Number of locations: 83 (2023)
- Areas served: Spain; Portugal
- Key people: Victor del Pozo (chairman); Marta Álvarez Guil (president)
- Products: Clothing; footwear; accessories; bedding; furniture; jewelry; beauty products; housewares
- Revenue: ▲€15.783 billion (2018)
- Net income: ▲€258 million (2018)
- Number of employees: ▲90,004 (2018)
- Subsidiaries: Hipercor; Bricor; Supercor; Opencor (former); Viajes El Corte Inglés; Informática El Corte Inglés
- Website: elcorteingles.es

El Corte Inglés S.A. (Note: Spanish pronunciation: [el ˈkoɾte jŋˈɡles]; Spanish for "the English Cut" (as in "the English style of dressmaking")) is a Spanish department store chain founded in 1940 by Ramón Areces and César Rodríguez. It is the last such remaining in Spain and Portugal, and has been a member of the International Association of Department Stores since 1998. It is the largest department store group in Europe, and the third-largest in the world.

== History ==
In 1934, the founders Ramón Areces Rodriguez and Cesar Rodriguez Gonzalez bought a tailor's shop (which began in 1890) located on one of Madrid's central streets, calle Preciados, at the corner of calle Carmen and calle Rompelanzas. They made it into a limited company. The property where the shop was located had been owned by Julián Gordo Centenera since 1930. The prime location of the property soon attracted the attention of an Asturian businessman, Pepin Fernandez, who was looking to expand a business called Sederias Carretas which he had started in 1934 with a capital contribution from his cousin Cesar Rodriguez Gonzales. His plan was to purchase all of the properties on the block to construct a new building to house his business, a vision which was later realized in the form of Galerias Preciados.

Around 1920, at 15, Areces had gone to Havana, Cuba, and worked at the famous retail chain Almacenes El Encanto, where he learned the basics of department store business. Cesar Rodriguez had asked Pepin Fernandez to hire his nephew Ramon Areces in Sederias Carretas shortly after his return from Cuba. Pepin refused, so Cesar requested that he at least allow Ramon to operate El Corte Inglés while plans to acquire the block and construct the new building were finalized. Pepin, who had also learned the department store business at Almacenes El Encanto, accepted the request, and transferred ownership of El Corte Inglés to Cesar on 23 December 1935, and acquired the property where it was located on behalf of Sederias Carretas soon after. Once Cesar took ownership of El Corte Inglés, he designated Ramon Areces as manager, a position which he held until his death, including during the Spanish civil war.

When the war ended in 1939, El Corte Inglés moved to calle Preciados, on the corner of calle Tetuan, near the location of Almacenes el Aguila, to make way for the new Galerias Preciados building. In 1940, Areces turned the tailor's shop into a sociedad limitada, registering with 1 million pesetas of capital and shares divided equally between Cesar Rodriguez, who became the first president of El Corte Inglés S.L., and Ramon Areces, whose share of the capital contribution came from a loan facilitated by his uncle. As the business expanded, eventually Cesar Rodriguez became the majority shareholder, although Areces remained in charge of strategic decisions and the day-to-day operations of the business.

In 1945 and 1946, El Corte Inglés acquired its new building and expanded to encompass 2,000 square meters of retail space on 5 floors, and shifted to a department store organizational style similar to that of Galerias Preciados, which had been operational since 1943. The company saw continuous growth until 1952, when it converted its legal structure from a sociedad limitada to a sociedad anónima in which Cesar Rodriguez remained president and majority shareholder, a position which he held until his death in 1966. After this, Ramon Areces, who until then had been managing director, became the president and largest shareholder.

The competition between El Corte Inglés and Galerias Preciados in the 1950s and 60's caused a revolution in Spanish retail distribution. Seasonal discounts, organized ad campaigns, air conditioned stores, massive use of publicity, large scale use of display windows, customer loyalty cards, point of sale data collection, and more. The expansion of El Corte Inglés began in 1962 with the opening of its second department store in Barcelona, and expansion continues until the present. Expansion also diversified into other formats including Hipercor, first introduced in Seville in 1980. In 1969, the company started to branch out of the retail sector, first opening a travel agency, Viajes El Corte Inglés, in 1969, followed by a telecom and computing equipment wholesaler, Investronica, in 1980, and an IT services and software development company, Informática El Corte Inglés (IECISA), in 1986.

After Areces died in 1989, his nephew Isidoro Álvarez became his successor and continued to expand the business while emphasizing self-reliant financing methods, opaque management techniques, and careful investment. In 1995, El Corte Inglés bought out Galerías Preciados, which was its only serious competitor. Galerias Preciados had entered bankruptcy. In addition to acquiring its arch-rival, El Corte Inglés purchased all of the Marks & Spencer stores in the Iberian peninsula in 2001.

El Corte Inglés entered into a partnership with Repsol in 1998, through which El Corte Inglés would operate convenience stores at Repsol fuel stations. These stores were initially known as Repsol-Supercor, or Repsol-Opencor after 2008, while those not attached to fuel stations were called Opencor. In 2001, El Corte Inglés opened a retail fashion outlet called Sfera. Its first big-box store, Bricor, specializing in home decor and DIY supplies, opened in 2006.

In October 2013, the firm sold a 51% stake in the financing department to the Spanish banking group Grupo Santander for around €140 million. From 2014 to 2018 the CEO of the company was Dimas Gimeno. In March 2018, El Corte Inglés closed its store on La Rambla of Barcelona.

In 2019, El Corte Inglés sold IECISA to GFI for €300 million. In June 2020, El Corte Inglés bought the private security and services company MEGA 2 for 28 million euros. In September 2021, El Corte Inglés was ordered by a Court of First Instance in Seville to provide a refund of €3,200 after a customer discovered that a television set did not have the technical specifications that the company claimed.

=== International expansion ===
The first attempts at international expansion happened in 1981 with the acquisition of the Harris Company, a chain of mid-sized department stores in the United States. The venture was unsuccessful, and in 1998 El Corte Inglés made a deal with Gottschalks, an American department store chain. Gottschalks took over management of the Harris Company's stores and gave El Corte Inglés 16% of Harris Company stock. It turned out to be a total loss later, when Gottschalks declared bankruptcy in the aftermath of the 2008 financial crisis.

That experience led to the company taking a much more conservative approach with its 2001 expansion in Portugal, with a store in Lisbon, followed in 2006 with a store in Vila Nova de Gaia, opposite the city of Porto. In 2006, just as it opened its second store outside of Spain (in Vila Nova de Gaia), the company announced expansion outside the Iberian Peninsula: Italy was to be the first country to host a store, but owing to the ongoing Eurozone crisis, the plan was suspended, as well as the opening of the third store in Portugal.

Various food products bearing the El Corte Inglés brand are marketed in Latin American stores.

== Business units ==
The business group is divided into the following areas of activity, which are usually commercially configured as companies whose shareholding belongs in its entirety or overwhelmingly majority to El Corte Inglés S.A .:

=== Retail ===
- El Corte Inglés S.A. The parent company, dedicated to distribution through department stores. This was the main activity of the company since its inception. In 2010 it still accounted for 59% of total revenues and about 63.7% of net profit. As of 28 February 2013, El Corte Inglés has 86 centres, 84 in Spain and 2 in Portugal.
- Hipercor. Chain of hypermarkets dedicated to the distribution of food and household appliances. Hipercor was a response to the entry of French capital into the Spanish market in the 1980s, including Alcampo, Pryca and Continente, with the latter two merging and now operating under the Carrefour brand. As of 28 February 2013, Hipercor has 42 centres in Spain.
- Bricor. Home improvement and home decor retailer. Bricor was a response to the consolidation of the sector by the Adeo group, which was formed from the Auchan group, which owned Alcampo, among other interests. The Auchan group also owns the Leroy Merlin, Aki and Bricomart brands in Spain. As of 28 February 2013, Bricor had 16 stores: 14 in Spain and 2 in Portugal.
- Supercor / Supercor Exprés. Supermarket and convenience store chain. Supercor emerged to compete with mid-sized local grocery stores at the end of the 1990s, such as Caprabo, Eroski, and Mercadona. Supercor Express is a smaller sized convenience store format which was adopted by the company in 2011. The sum total of convenience stores, including Supercor, Supercor Express, and Opencor was 238 as of 28 February 2013.
- Sfera. Fashion retailer stores group. over as of the end of 2022, 490 points of sale - mostly freestanding stores - owned and franchised, including 75 stores-in-store within El Corte Inglés department stores in Spain and Portugal. Sales in fiscal 2020 were 461 million euro. There are stores (as of December 2022) in: It was conceived as a response to chains like H&M, and the Spanish brands Mango, Zara, and Springfield, the latter two of which belong to Inditex and Cortefiel respectively.

=== IT and communications ===
In the IT and communications fields, El Corte Inglés has three subsidiaries, which are listed in order of establishment:

- Informática El Corte Inglés (IECISA). Dedicated to IT consulting, software development and computing services.
- Investrónica. Consumer computing and telephony wholesaler, and former computer manufacturer under the Inves brand. Integrated in IECISA from 2015.
- Telecor. Telecommunications services for consumers and businesses.

=== Service sector ===
In the service sector, the El Corte Inglés group owns:

- Viajes El Corte Inglés. Travel agency group from a wholesale and retail point of view. As travel agency it has 599 branches worldwide, 506 of which are in Spain and 93 abroad.
- Seguros El Corte Inglés (CESS). Insurance company dedicated to insurance brokerage and financial and real estate mediation. It has 105 branches, most of which are located in the El Corte Inglés department stores, although some are dedicated Seguros El Corte Inglés storefronts.
- Financiera El Corte Inglés. A consumer credit company that finances purchases for customers and distributes the El Corte Inglés shopping card. Present in Spain and Portugal. 51% of the capital of Financiera El Corte Inglés belongs to Banco Santander as of 2014.
- MEGA 2. A security and terciary service company present in Spain and Portugal.
- Grupo Sicor. Provision of services related to physical and digital security, integral services, cleaning and maintenance, logistics, and employment.
- Sweno. A telecomm company.
- Sweno Energia. A residential and commercial electrical utility.
- Bitcor. A cryptocurrency company.

=== Auxiliary businesses ===
El Corte Inglés owns 100% of a number of businesses auxiliary to their main business functions, unless otherwise noted.

- Industrias y Confecciones S.A. (INDUYCO). Integrated into the group in 2010.
- Ason Inmobiliaria de Arriendos S.L. A real estate and rental management company.
- Construcciones, Promociones e Instalaciones S.A. A construction and renovation company.
- Editorial Universitaria Ramón Areces S.A. A publisher of text books for Spanish universities.
- Tourmodial Operadores S.A. A travel services company.
- Parinver S.A. (75.83%). A holding company which owns some hotel groups and other businesses.

The company has partial ownership in other businesses:

- 50% of Gestion de Puntos de Venta S.A. (GESPEVESA) which manages Opencor stores at Repsol fuel stations.
- 50% of Sephora Cosmeticos España S. L.
- 6.15% of Euroforum Escorial S.A., a training and corporate events company.
- 4,36 % of Parque Temático de Madrid S.A. which operates Parque Warner Madrid.
- 1.7% of IAG.

=== E-commerce ===
El Corte Inglés' website was the largest in terms of the number of its customers in Spain, with 3.7 million customers in 2011. In 2013, 3.5 million customers and 137 million visits were registered. In December 2016 they reached their monthly peak, with more than 14 million unique users and more than 30 million visits to www.elcorteingles.es, increasing to 32 million in January 2017, becoming the most visited Spanish commercial website in Spain. It was the second most visited ecommerce website in Spain in 2017, behind Amazon.com.

Since 1999 its General Director of Electronic Commerce and Distance Sales Division is Ricardo Goizueta Sagues and the Digital Director or Chief Digital Officer (CDO) is, since 2012, José María Fernández Ortega.

== Corporate affairs ==
According to Deloitte's report on "Global Powers of Retailing," El Corte Inglés ranked 97th in 2020, down 27 places from 2019, when it ranked 69th. This made it the 3rd largest retailer by volume in Spain, behind Inditex and Mercadona. Total retail revenue in 2020 amount to €12,077 million. As of 2008, it was the second largest family business in Spain, and the 66th largest in the world.

The company's retail revenue and net profit both increased continuously until 2007, when they began to drop. The company has not since returned to its 2007 peak of revenue, which was close to €18,000 million, with €747.6 million net profits. Since then, both revenue and profits declined until 2015, and then increased until 2019.

=== Shareholders ===
Although the company is known for jealously guarding its privacy, numerous statements have indicated that the Ramón Areces Foundation is the biggest shareholder, with 37% of the company's shares willed to the foundation by its founder. Isidoro Alvarez controls these shares as president of the foundation, together with his own shares, which are believed to be somewhere between 15 and 27% of total shares, making him the largest shareholder.

Cartera de Valores IASA is the second biggest shareholder, with 22% of shares. Approximately 9% of shares are owned by the children of Luis Areces, Ramon Areces' brother, via the Corporacion Ceslar. Equal parts of approximately 3% of the shares, were divided between the four brothers of the Areces Fuentes brothers, sons of Ramon Areces' other brother Celestino. The brothers acquired these shares through inheritance after the liquidation of the holding company. After a lengthy legal conflict, however, they sold their shares to El Corte Inglés.

Ingondel S.L. which held 6% of El Corte Inglés' capital, was property of descendants of César Rodríguez. It was acquired in 2009. A 7% share is in the hands of Cartera Mancor, S.L., which is also made up of the descendants of César Rodríguez, by way of Paloma García Peña.

Approximately 3% is held by other members of the administrative council, and the remainder is divided between the treasure and some 3000 directors and executives of the company. It is presumed that these shareholders are always employees while they hold shares, since there are restrictions on the transfer of shares.

The administrative council of El Corte Inglés is composed of the following individuals:

- Marta Álvarez Guil. elected president 11 July 2019.
- Cristina Álvarez Guil.
- Jesús Nuño de la Rosa y Coloma.
- Fernando Becker Zuazua.
- Manuel Pizarro Moreno.
- Víctor del Pozo Gil.
- Hamad bin Jassem bin Jabr Al Thani, represented by Shahzad Shahbaz.
- Cartera Mancor, S.L, represented by Paloma García Peña.
- Corporación Ceslar, represented by Ana Carlota Areces Galán.
- Antonio Hernández-Gil (secretary).
- Juan Moral-de la Rosa (vice-secretary)

== Business model ==
Like Galerias Preciados in its time, El Corte Inglés' business model was based on introducing American style department stores to Spain during a period where Spain was emerging from economic isolation and autarky. As such, its business model revolved around the idea of a store where customer could buy everything, hence its slogan "The store for all your shopping" (La tienda de todas tus compras). Stores aimed not only to offer a wide variety of articles, but also goods of different levels of quality, with goods divided into departments with additional services such as home deliveries, wedding lists, repairs included in sale price, etc., as well as satisfaction and quality assurances through money-back guarantees.

This model depends on the performance of the following actors:

=== Customers ===
The company's main business model has remained constant until the present. Its social and corporate responsibility documents emphasize five pillars of commitment to the customers: quality, service, assortment, specialization, and guarantees. This approach has been used to build customer loyalty.

In the food department, the company has launched a generic brand called Aliada. The El Corte Inglés shopping card is a credit card which was introduced in 1968, and is one of the most popular in Spain, with 11.58 million active cards in Spain in 2017. Card holders have a one-month grace period to pay off the balance of their card, with an option to defer payment for up to three months without interest, although administrative fees apply. Payment can also be deferred with low interest payments for up to 36 months. The card also grants holders the right to at least 2 hours free parking in store parking garages, and allows the purchase of any product sold in El Corte Inglés centers. Since 2006, the card can also be used to pay for fuel at Repsol fuel stations.

=== Human resources ===
In 2011, the company's workforce was made up of 99,323 employees, down from 102,699 the previous year. 93% of those had long-term contracts, and 71% were full-time. The median age of employees was 39 years, with 13 years of experience. 37% of total employees were male compared to 63% female, although in management males outnumbered females.

Annual reports indicated that in 2012, the total number of employees further declined to 96,678, 94% of whom were full time, and 64% of whom were female. The relationship between El Corte Inglés and its employees has traditionally been formal, familiar, and paternalistic, with the company trying to establish feedback between the company and its employees. The company provides training and educational assistance, financial services, and discounts or financing for purchasing goods and services.

The company has received criticism for discriminating against women, harassment of labor unions, is directly implicated in exploitative labor practices. In the majority of the company's locations, union elections are won by Fetico or FASGA, a national retail union accused of being a yellow union by the UGT and CCOO. Some companies in the El Corte Inglés group, such as Induyco, have been criticized by groups like Oxfam for issues of precarious work and exploitation of textile workers in third world countries.

=== Suppliers ===
The company has pursued vertical integration since early on, especially with textiles, when Ramon Areces and other shareholders founded Induyco in 1949, and which became a sociedad anonimo in 1955. Induyco, in spite of having a non-proprietary relationship with El Corte Inglés, initially had El Corte Inglés as its exclusive wholesale client, and its employees were offered benefits as if they belonged to the same group. Later, Induyco still had El Corte Inglés as its majority client, although the relationship was no longer exclusive, though its share structure remained the same, and Isidoro Alvarez was the president. In 2010 El Corte Inglés integrated Induyco into its corporate structure, and in 2012 it ceased activities.

In the field of texties, in addition to Induyco, the company created Confecciones Teruel in 1975 and Industrias del Vestido in 1976. Both companies got the majority of their capital from the Induyco group which itself was part of Investronica and Invesgen. Its creation was motivated by labor conflicts which occurred at Induyco during those years. In the field of supplying special materials for sale, the company created Mostoles Industrial in the same way as Induyco. Mostoles Industrial, unlike Induyco, retained El Corte Inglés as its exclusive customer while having a non-proprietary relationship with it. Mostoles is most well known for its production of kitchen furniture for the "Forlady" brand.

On the side of real estate development, the company created Construcción, Promociones e Instalaciones S.A. in 1976, whose capital is derived in its entirety from the El Corte Inglés group, and which is responsible for the construction of new stores and renovation of existing ones.

=== Publicity and advertising ===
El Corte Inglés has one of the biggest advertising budgets in Spain. In 2011, the group was the biggest advertiser in Spain, with an investment of 171.3 million euros, and as an individual El Corte Inglés itself was the third biggest, with a budget of 99.8 million euros. The company periodically conducts large publicity campaigns like Semana Fanstisca (Fantasic Week) and the Ocho Dias de Oro (the Eight Golden Days) by announcing discounts on its products. On the Christmas holiday, it organizes an animation spectacle called "Cortylandia" in its main stores.

Furthermore, part of El Corte Inglés' company culture includes sponsoring a number of activities that also serve as a form of advertising. For example, the El Corte Inglés Rally is a rally race that ran on the Canary Islands from 1977 to 2001.

== Flagship stores ==
=== Madrid-Castellana flagship ===
The chain's Spanish: buque insignia (flagship) department store is El Corte Inglés Castellana in Madrid's Tetuán district, in the Cuatro Caminos neighbourhood, just west of Paseo de la Castellana boulevard and Nuevos Ministerios station. It opened in 1969 and its biggest extension opened on 7 October 2011 on the site of the Windsor Building which caught fire in 2005 and was demolished. In its place, the Torre Titania tower, which connects to the original store, was built. It was designed by architects Pablo Muñoz López and Pedro Vilata Capón/Capont.

The complex encompasses several buildings. The largest has 27 floors, including five below ground dedicated providing parking for 1,600 cars. There are two block of two technical floors each which house engine rooms, air treatment units, elevator machinery, etc. There is a total floor area of 170,000 m^{2} (1,800,000 sq ft) of which 70,000 m^{2} (750,000 sq ft) is dedicated to retail sales, thus ranking among the 20 largest department store locations currently in operation worldwide. The company spent around 300 million euro from 2008 through 2011 with the construction of a new building at Castellana 85, dedicated to decoration, that was then integrated with the existing one. After the remodeling and reorganization, merchandise was presented in a differentiated and themed way, in addition to new brands, services, and spaces, such as the Gourmet Experience a food hall with sales of gourmet products, and dining options such as seafood, Asian, Italian, Iberian specialties, hamburgers, grilled meats and fish, cheeses, skewers, fresh pastries, and fresh juices.

The Castellana flagship location carries the most comprehensive collection of designers of any large store in Spain. Designer boutiques in the store include Hermès, Louis Vuitton, Cartier, Armani, Armani Jeans, Armani Collezioni, Gucci, Loewe, Dockers, Ralph Lauren, Bulgari, Dior, Dior Homme, Georges Rech, Versace, Hugo Boss, Boss Woman, Ermenegildo Zegna, Tommy Hilfiger, Dolce&Gabbana, Burberry (men/women), Façonnable, Pal Zileri, Paul & Shark, Lacoste, Pavillon Christofle, CH by Carolina Herrera, Escada Sport, James Purdey and Sons, Lloyd's, Purificación García, Calvin Klein, Caroll Paris, Amitie, and Episode. The store has its own brands (Emidio Tucci, Dustin).

Also in the complex is a branch of the Madrid-based Aldeo jewelers, carrying such jewellery designers as Boucheron, Blancpain and Hamilton.

=== Preciados–Callao store ===
The Preciados–Callao store complex in the heart of Madrid consists of 4 buildings, including the original flagship Madrid stores of El Corte Inglés and Galerías Preciados:

- Calle de Preciados #3–5, 7 stories, original flagship of the chain, opened 1945 at #3, expanded 1955 to #5 - men's, women's and children's clothing and accessories including some sports apparel, cosmetics and fragrances, plus a café and restaurant
- Plaza de Callao #2. Built 1964-8, architects Antonio Perpiñá Sebriá^{(es)} and Luis Iglesias on site of Hotel Florida as the flagship of Galerías Preciados which moved from adjacent Preciados #28, now Fnac. 9 stories - home and other non-apparel departments including the Gourmet Experience food hall on floor 9
- Plaza de la Puerta del Sol #10, 4 stories - sports clothing and accessories, sporting goods
- Calle Maestro Victoria #6, 1 story (pet supplies)

== Brands ==
- El Corte Inglés department stores, Hipercor hypermarkets, Supercor urban supermarkets

Clothing

- Alía
- Dustin
- Easy Wear
- Emidio Tucci
  (men's formalwear)
- Énfasis
- Formul@ Joven
- Gloria Ortiz
  (clothing, accessories)
- Lloyd's
- Sfera
- Yera
- Unit

Sports apparel

- Boomerang
- Runfit (Hipercor only)

Cosmetics

- Línea Pura
- Oleada
- Plantea (skin care)
- Veckia

Home furnishings (only at El Corte Inglés stores)

- Privium
- Urban-Chic
- Urban-Class
- Casa Actual

Home appliances and electronics

- Saivod
- Ansonic: (only in Hipercor)
- Digrato (coffee machines/capsules)
- Inves (software)

Culture

- Ámbito Cultural: cultural events, expositions, literary prizes, cinematography, musical and painting awards, scholarships.
- Cineclub: collection of classic cinema.
- Pitiflú: children's entertainment, including storytelling, magic shows, workshops, puppet shows, children's theater and circus events.
- Rubiños 1860: bookstore.

Food

- Aliada: generic brand
- Special Line: diet foods

Telecom

- Sweno
- Telecor

Cryptocurrency

- Bitcor

Private security

- Sicor

Other

- La Tienda en Casa: telesales via television and internet
- Oralli: travel accessories
- Doblecero: loyalty card
- Primeriti: private online sales club

== Gallery ==
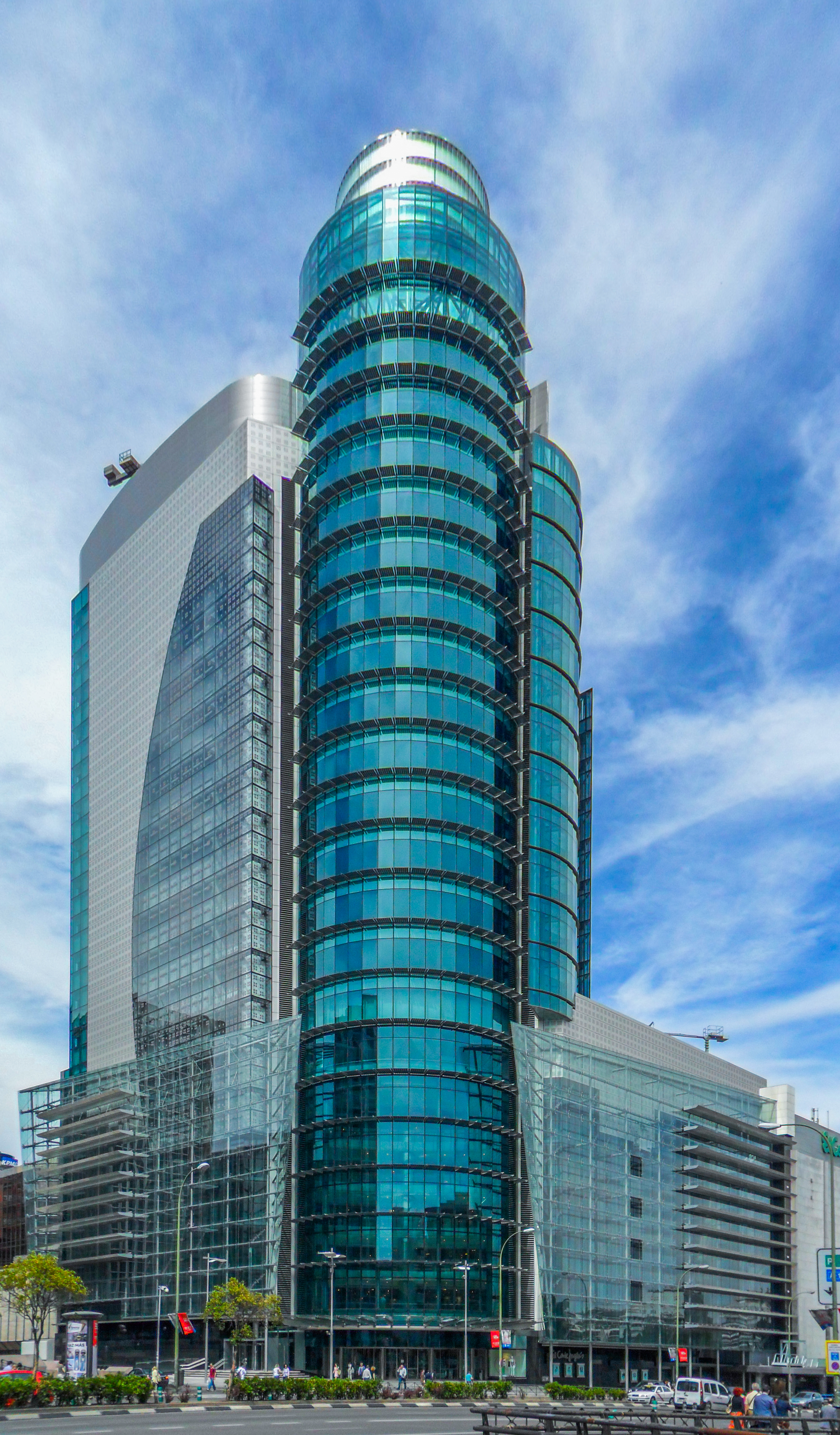
Exterior of the flagship store at the Torre Titania in Castellana, Madrid (2014)

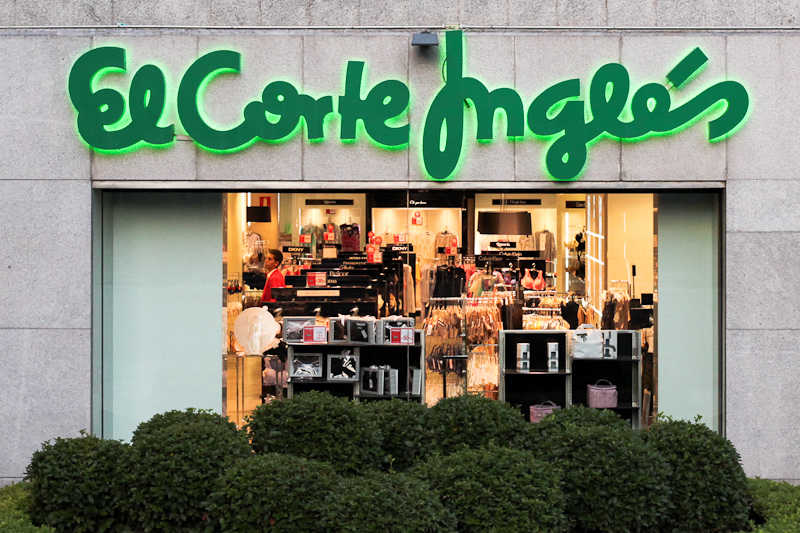
Aranda de Duero store

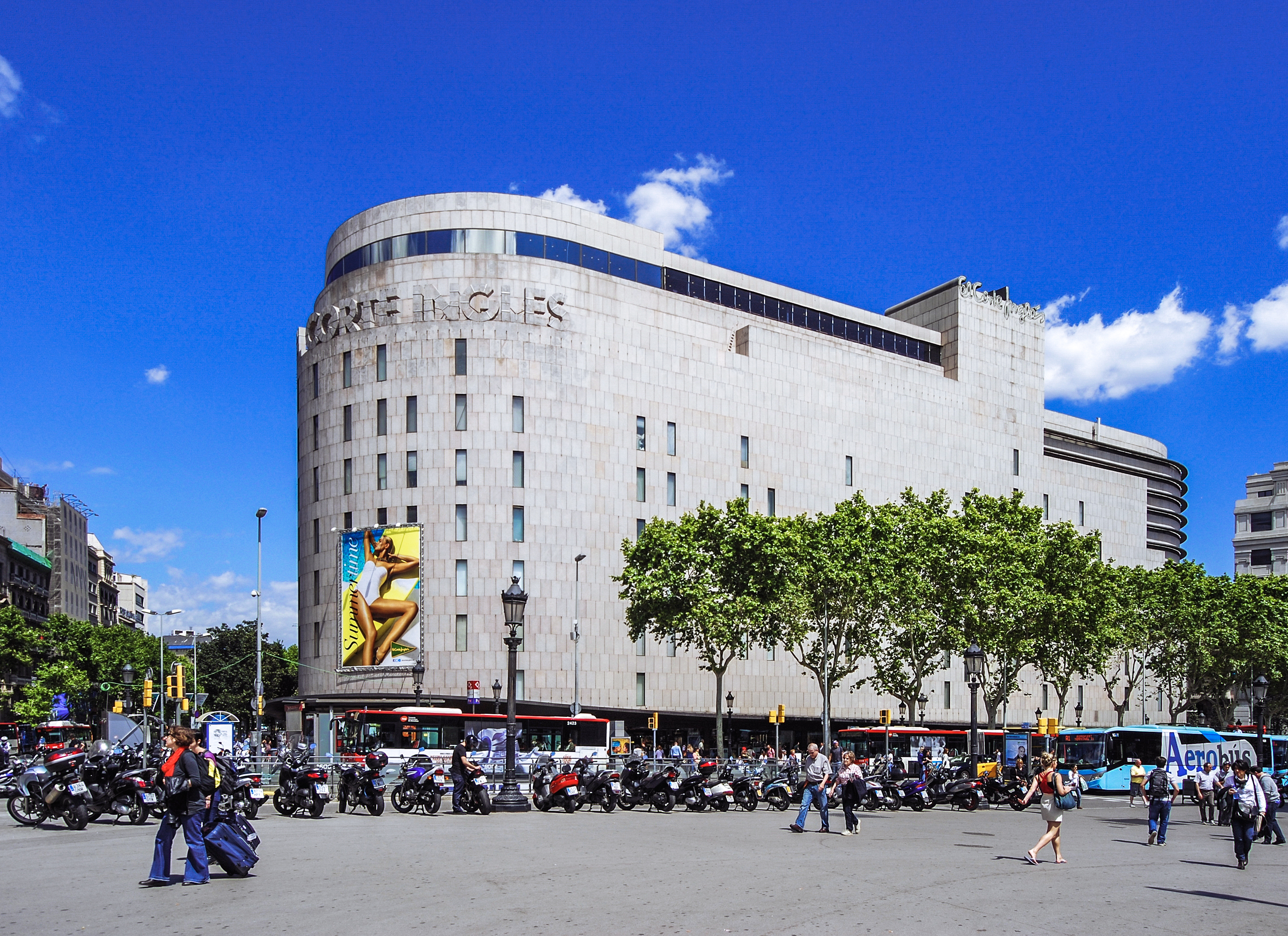
Plaça Catalunya store, Barcelona

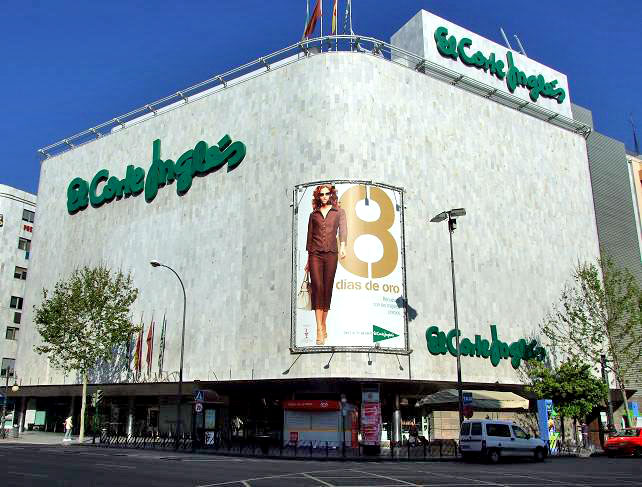
Córdoba store

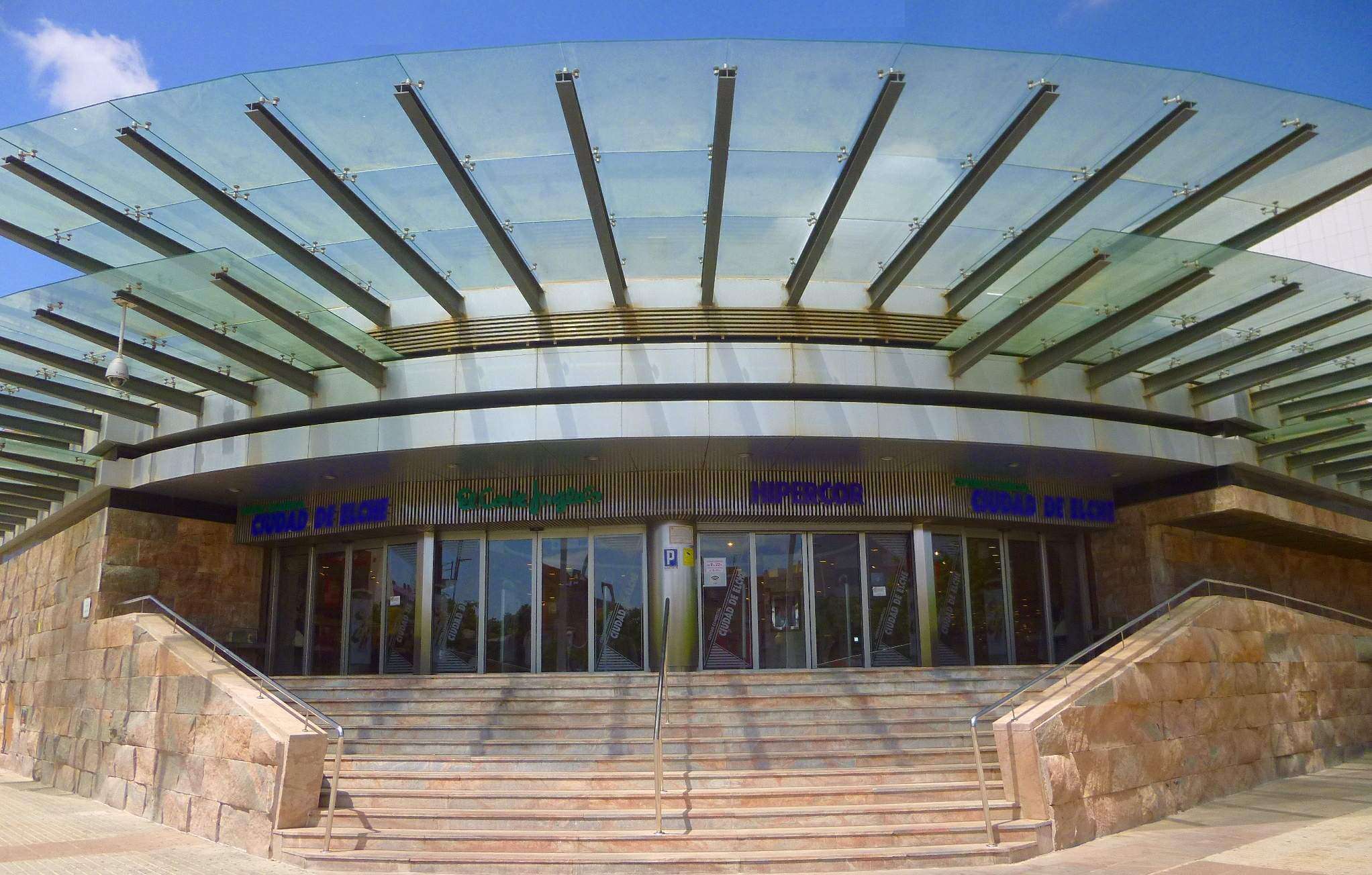
Elche (Elx) store, 2009

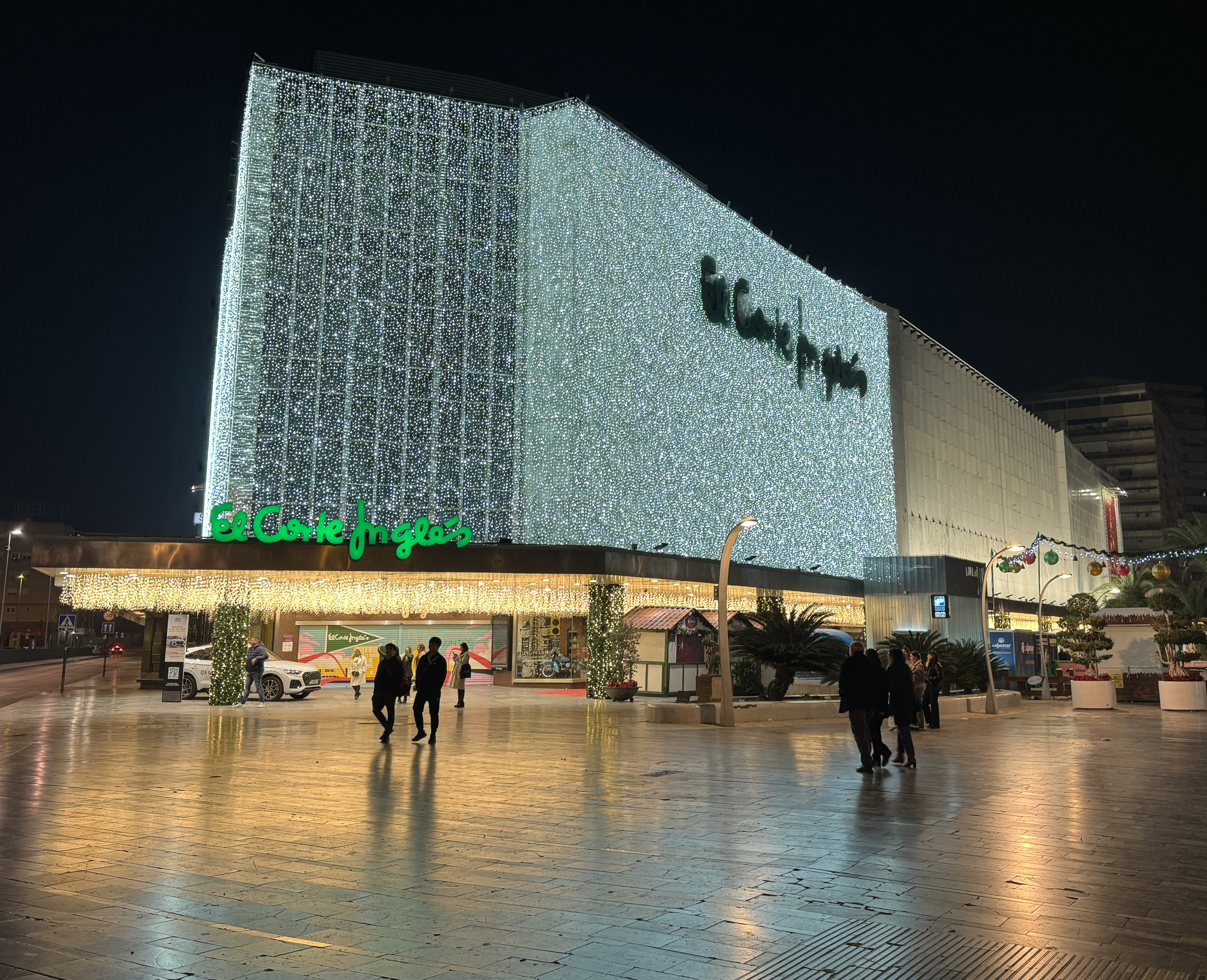
Murcia store at Christmastime 2023

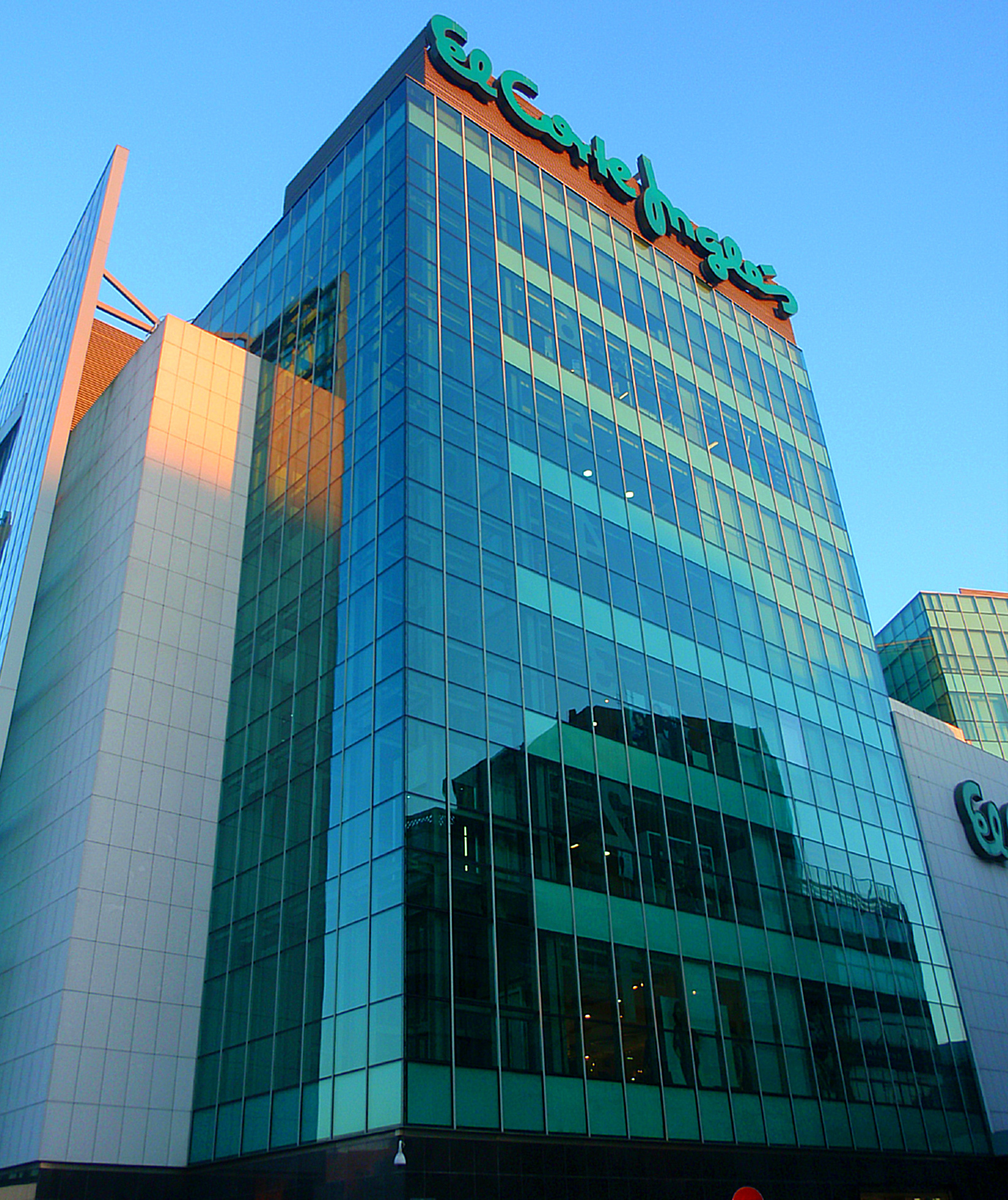
Porto, Portugal store

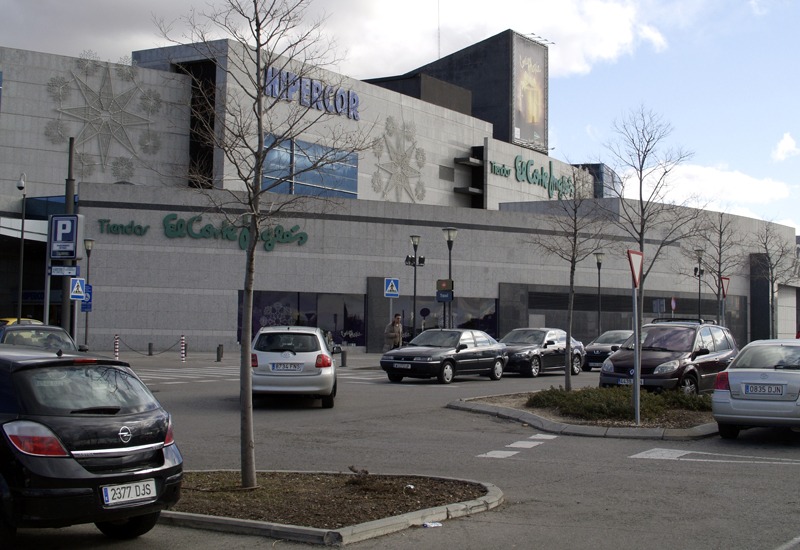
The Hipercor and El Corte Inglés stores at Xanadu mall, Madrid area
