= Dimas Gimeno =

Spanish businessman (born 1975)

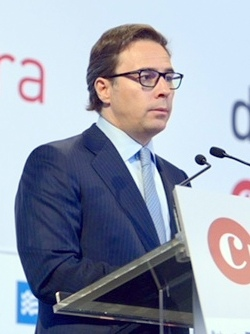
- Dimas Gimeno, Chairman of the Board of Directors of "El Corte Inglés", March 6, 2018
- Born: Dimas Gimeno Álvarez; 1975 (age 50–51); Madrid, Spain
- Education: Universidad San Pablo CEU de Madrid; Escuela de Negocios IESE
- Occupation: Business executive
- Spouses: Mónica Esteban Morán
- Children: 3
- Website: dimasgimeno.com

Dimas Gimeno (Madrid, December 14, 1975) is a Spanish businessman who specializes in the retail sector. He ran the Spain-based department store El Corte Inglés from 2014 to 2018. He holds a law degree and a Masters in Private Law from CEU San Pablo University. He also earned an EMBA from AESE Escola de Direcção e Negócios / IESE University of Navarra in Porto, Portugal.

== Biography ==
=== Early life ===
Dimas Gimeno was born in Madrid on December 14, 1975. At that time, his uncle was the Managing Director of El Corte Inglés, Isidoro Álvarez. He is the son of Antonia Álvarez and Miguel Ángel Gimeno García, both from Spain's Asturias province. He has two older brothers: Miguel Ángel and Diana. Gimeno inherited his name from his grandfather Dimas Álvarez Rodríguez, who was the cousin of the second president of El Corte Inglés, Ramón Areces.

He is married to Mónica Esteban Morán, president of the NGO Juegaterapia, and advertising creative director at the TAPSA agency. With her, Gimeno has three children.

=== Education ===
Gimeno graduated in 1997 with a degree in law from the CEU San Pablo University of Madrid, and the following year obtained a Masters in Private Law from the same university. In 1999, after spending six months as an intern in the litigation department of law firm Baker McKenzie, he traveled to Australia to study film direction at the University of Technology in Sydney. During his year in Australia, he took two courses and shot two short films.

== Career path ==
Since the age of 20, Gimeno's professional career has been linked to department store chain El Corte Inglés, a company that is considered an Entity of Public Interest in Spain and is the largest employer in the country (in 2016 it had 92,690 employees). He started working in these department stores when he was a college student, as a salesman in the shirts department of the Castellana Center in Madrid. In 2000, after completing his university education and studies in Australia, he moved to the company's central services, developing his career in various departments. In 2001, Gimeno collaborated from Lisbon in the start-up of the company's subsidiary in Portugal, as an assistant to the manager. During his tenure as CEO of El Corte Inglés, the group achieved important milestones such as the international expansion to Portugal, the launch of e-commerce and the creation of fashion brands and hospitality areas such as Gourmet Experience. During this period, sales increased, and EBITDA went from 721.41 million euros in 2013 to 980.93 in 2016. In 2006 he was appointed director of the Porto location, whose opening he had headed. In 2008, back in Madrid, he returned to the company's central services, where he joined the sales department. In 2009 he became a member of the Board of Trustees of the Ramón Areces Foundation and one year later he joined the Board of Directors of El Corte Inglés.

He was appointed advisor to the CEO of El Corte Inglés in 2013 and became CEO on September 16, 2014, two days after the death of his uncle Isidoro. Following his appointment, he helped the company recover from a position of financial debt and increase sales. Dimas Gimeno held that position until June 14, 2018.
