= Théret =

Théret is a surname. Notable people with the surname include:

- Christa Théret (born 1991), French actress
- Max Théret (1913–2009), French businessman
