= Hipercor =

Spanish hypermarket chain

Hipercor, S.A.

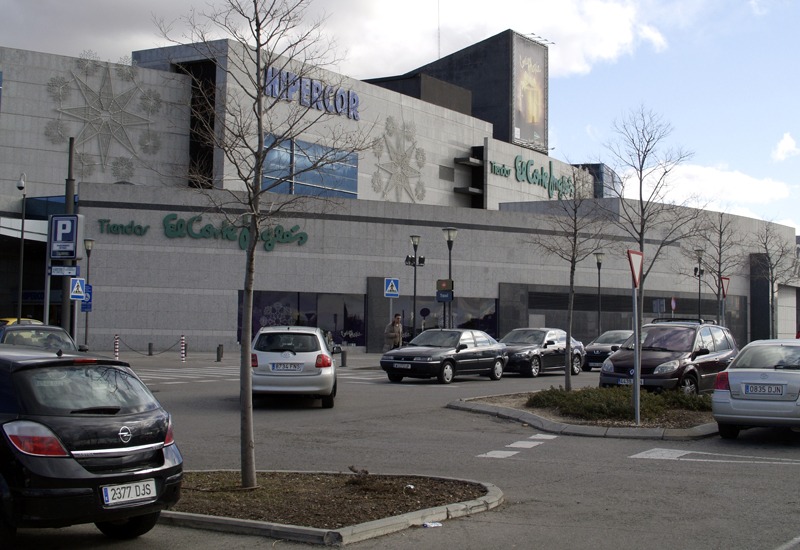
- Type: Sociedad Anónima
- Industry: Retail (Hypermarket)
- Founded: Madrid, Spain (January 1, 1979)
- Headquarters: Madrid, Spain
- Area served: Nationwide
- Parent: El Corte Inglés, S.A.
- Website: www.hipercor.es

Hipercor S.A. is an upscale chain of hypermarkets in Spain, belonging to the same group as El Corte Inglés. It has its head office in the El Corte Inglés head office building in Madrid.

Hipercor generally stocks a wide range of household and food products across large floorspaces (1 or 2 storeys) and are usually located as part of the same building complexes (styled as centro commercial) as the El Corte Inglés department store. The first Hipercor hypermarket was inaugurated on 5 September 1980 in Seville.

Other 'Cor' supermarkets include SuperCor (average sized units) and OpenCor, smaller convenience stores that open all year round from 07/08:00 and closing at 01/02:00 the following morning.

On 19 June 1987, a car bomb exploded in the underground car park of a Hipercor supermarket in Barcelona, killing 21 civilians and injuring 45, amongst them several small children. Santiago Arrospide, also known as Santi Potros, and Rafael Caride Simon were sentenced to 790 years in prison for their role in the attack. Both Arrospide and Simon were members of the Basque separatist group ETA.

== See also ==
- Ipercoop
