= Sfera (retailer) =

Spanish retail chain

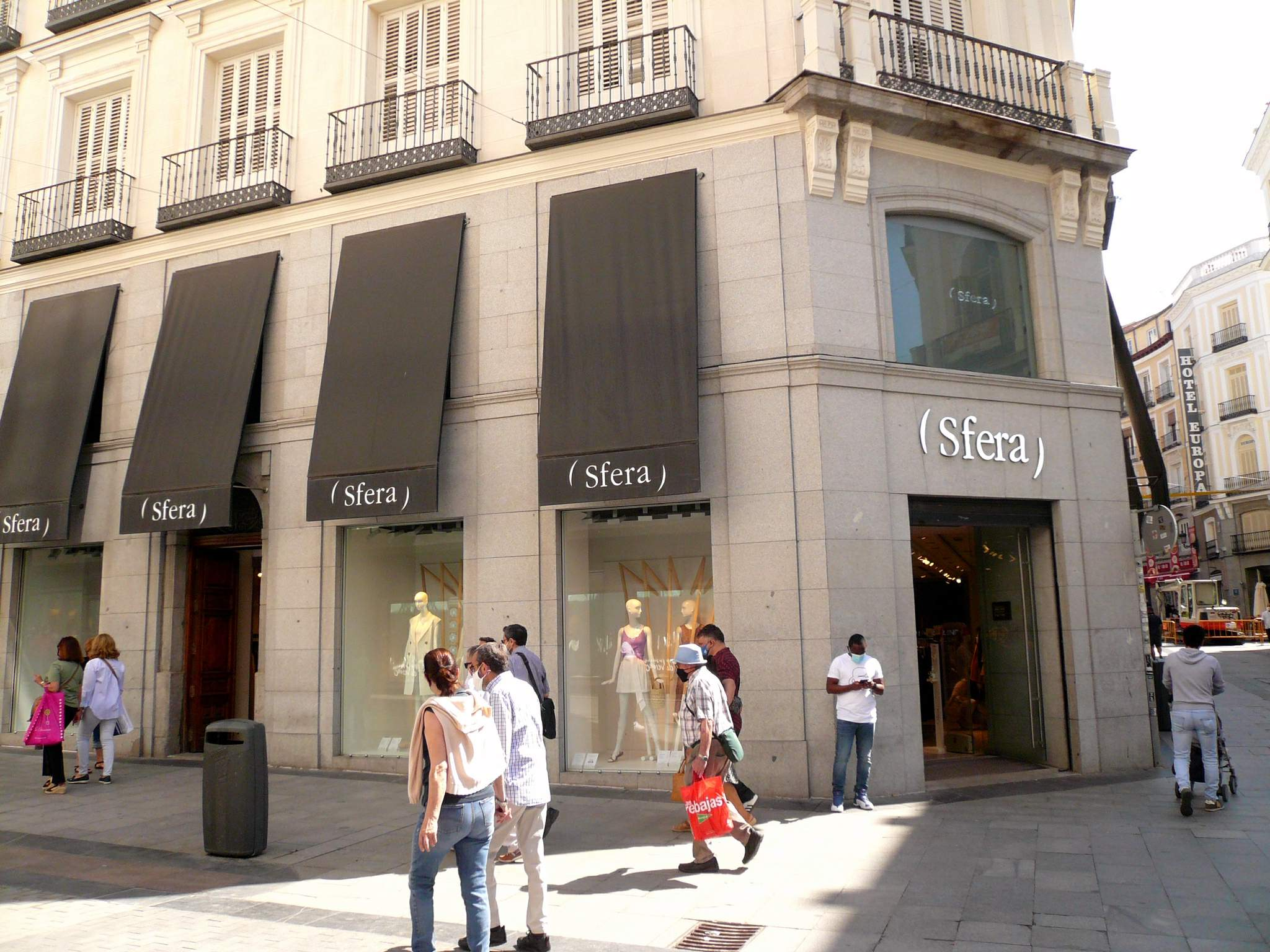
- Sfera store in Preciados street, Madrid
- Industry: Retail clothing stores
- Headquarters: Hermosilla 112, Madrid, Spain
- Number of locations: 490 (2022)
- Products: Clothing
- Revenue: 461 million EUR (2020)

Sfera is a chain over as of the end of 2022, 490 retail stores and other points of sale owned by El Corte Inglés S.A. the group which also operates the Spanish department stores of the same name, and other retail formats. Sales in fiscal 2020 were 461 million euro. There are stores (as of December 2022) in:

Sfera's brand proposition is "comfortable, up-to-date, and affordable garments that are perfect for the most demanding customers to find their own style".

Country	Owned stores		Franchise stores
Country	Standalone	Inside El Corte Inglés dept. stores	Franchise stores
Spain	102	73	
Portugal	8	2	
Greece	3		
Mexico	51		
Cyprus			2
Ireland			18
Switzerland			53
Guatemala			10
El Salvador			12
Nicaragua			3
Costa Rica			7
Panama			9
Peru			39
Paraguay			6
Chile			57
UAE			3
Qatar			1
Thailand			31
