= Callao Square =

Central square in Madrid

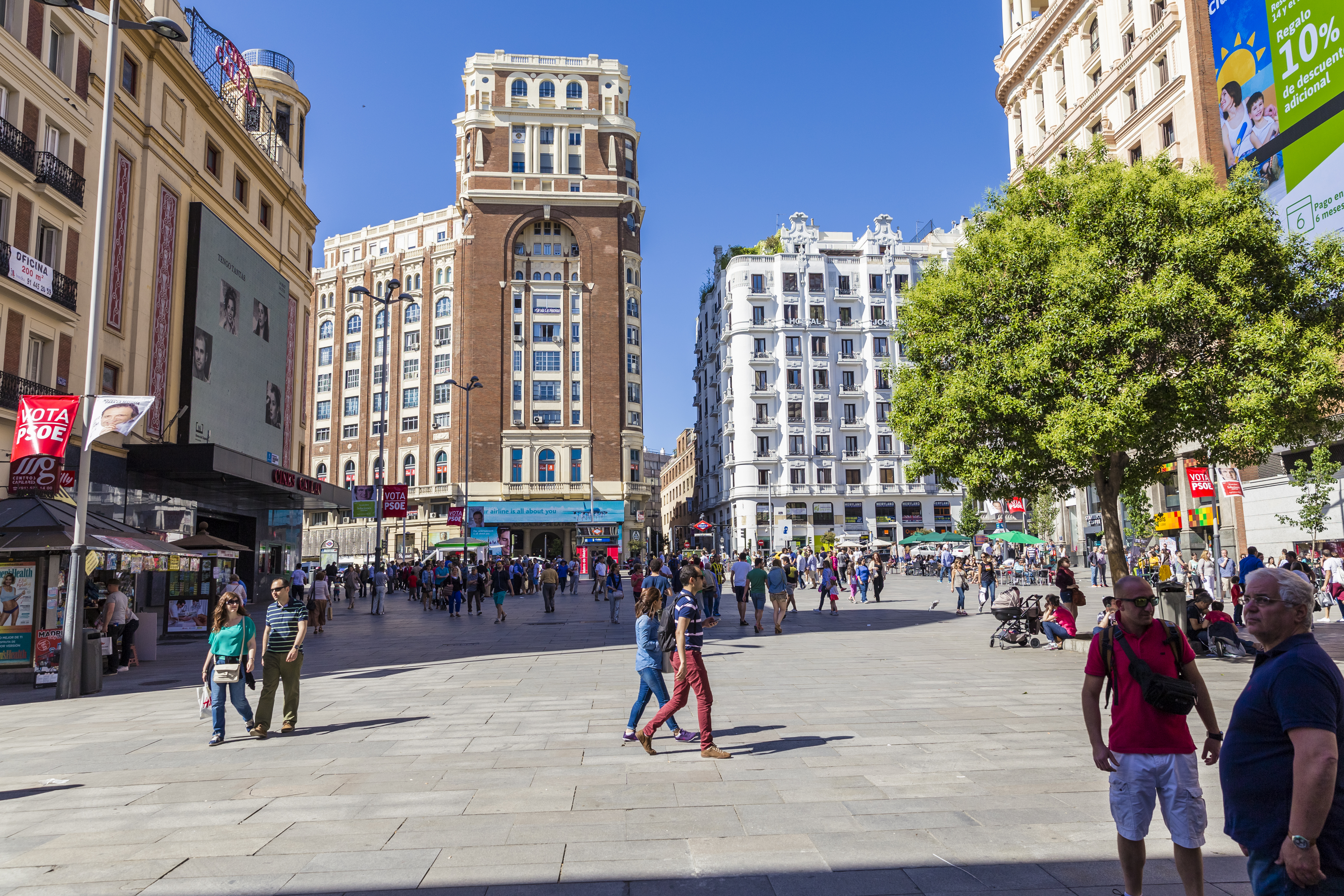
- View of the square in 2015
- Native name: Plaza del Callao (Spanish)
- Namesake: Battle of Callao
- Type: square
- Maintained by: Ayuntamiento of Madrid
- Location: Centro, Madrid, Spain
- Postal code: 28013
- Coordinates: 40.419862°N 3.705828°W
- Major junctions: Calle de Preciados, Gran Vía

The Callao Square (Spanish: plaza del Callao) is located at the centre of the Spanish capital of Madrid.

== History and description ==
Shaped in 1861, the square was formally opened in June 1866; its name remembers the May 1866 battle of Callao between the Spanish naval forces under the command of Casto Méndez Núñez and the Peruvian army.

The square was substantially and aggressively reformed in the 21st century. The reform removed nearly all elements present by that time, except the metro station access and a big tree, turning the square into a pedestrian and homogeneous space, while adding a limited number of pieces of urban furniture. Conversely, big screens were added to the surrounding buildings. Located in a very commercial area of the city, the pedestrian space is often for rent to companies wanting to carry out advertising events.

== Buildings ==
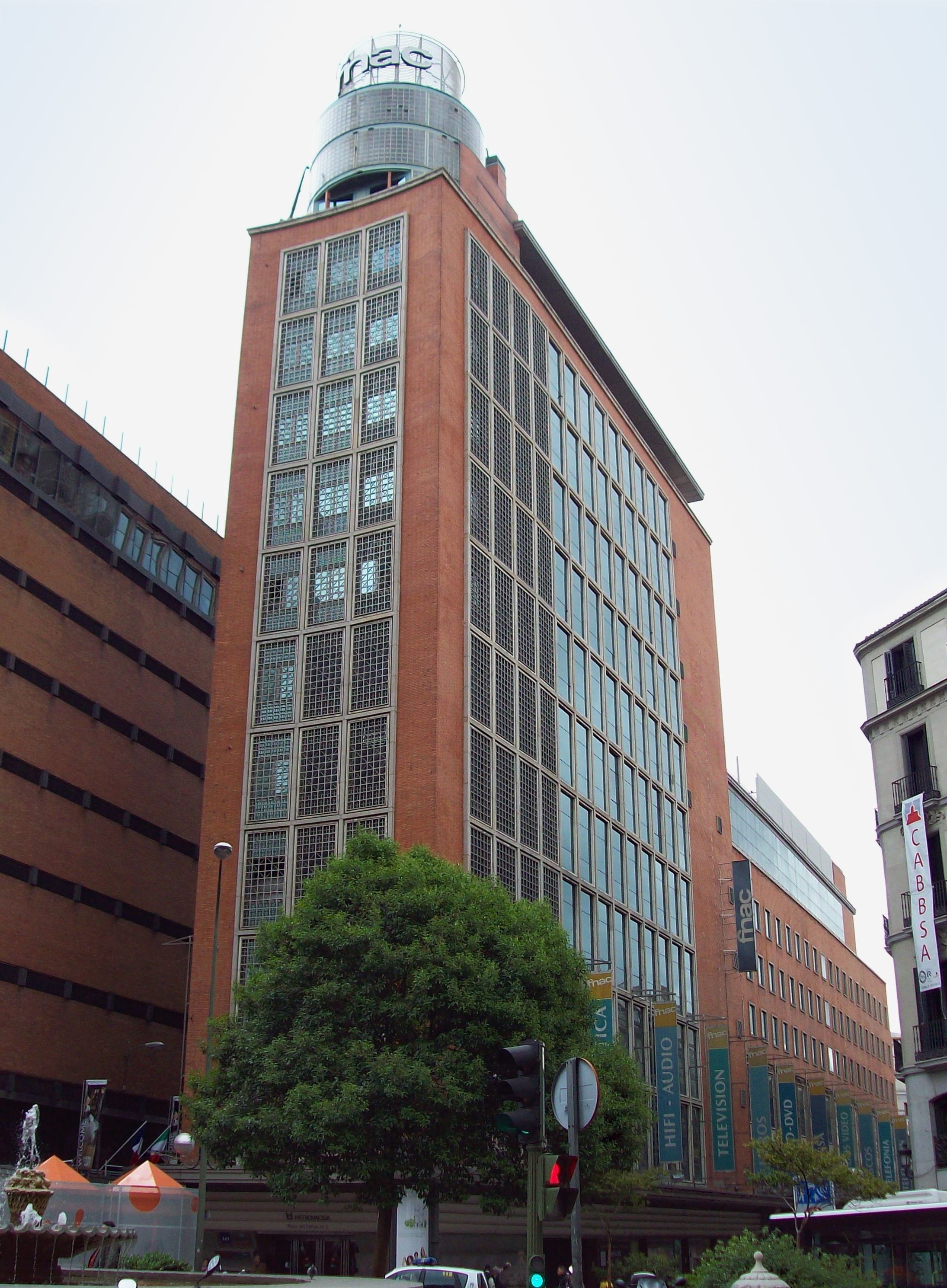
Fnac in Plaza de Callao, formerly a Galerías Preciados department store until 1993)

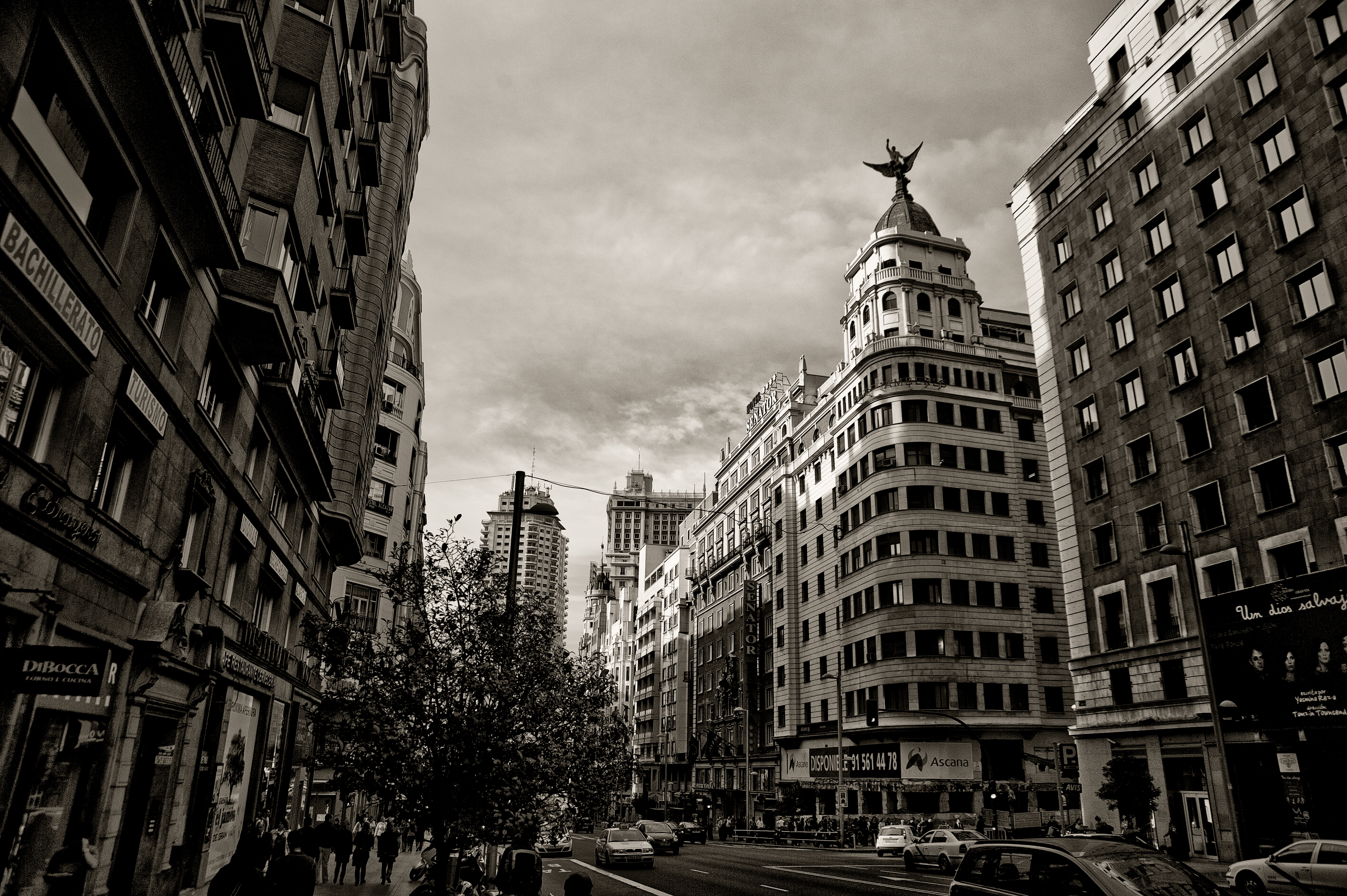
La Adriática building at Plaza de Callao #3 / Gran Vía #39

Buildings on the Square include:

- Cine Callao
- El Corte Inglés department store at #2, 9 stories, part of a multi-building store complex
- Fnac
- La Adriática building at Plaza de Callao #3 (Gran Vía #39)
- Hotel Florida (demolished)

== See also ==
- Piccadilly Circus
- Times Square
- Sankofa Square
- Shibuya
