= André Essel =

French activist (4 September 1918 – 31 March 2005)

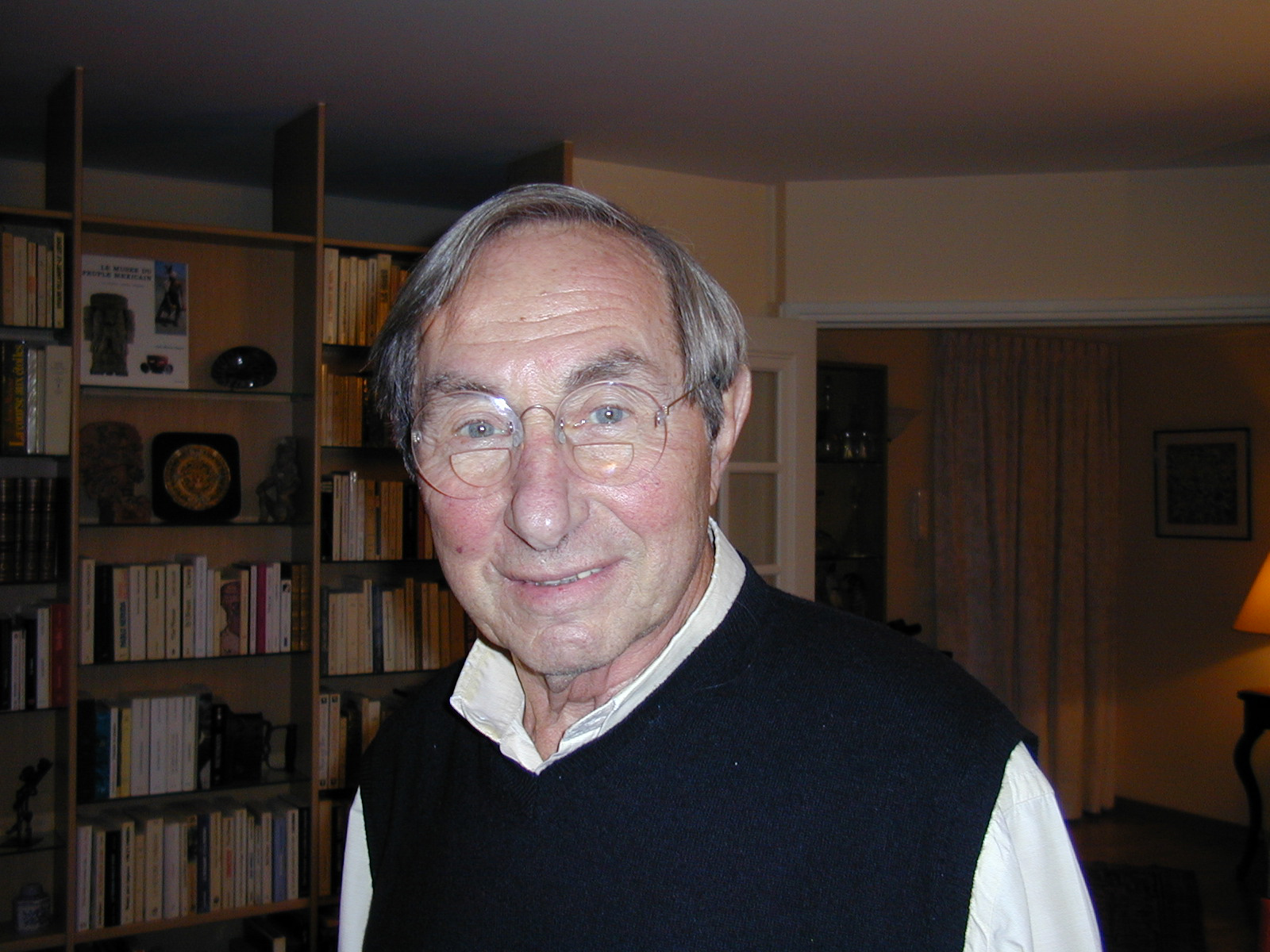
- André Essel in Paris, 2002
- Born: 4 September 1918; Toulouse, France
- Died: 31 March 2005 (aged 86); Paris, France
- Occupations: Entrepreneur, political activist
- Known for: Co-founder of Fnac

André Essel (4 September 1918 – 31 March 2005) was the co-founder of Fnac, originally Fédération nationale d’achats des cadres, or National Purchasing Federation for Middle Managers, alongside Max Théret. He was also an anti-fascist activist and a believer in Trotskyism.

== Achievements ==
Essel was awarded the French Cross of War honouring his involvement in the Second World War on the side of the Allies against the Axis forces.

== Forming of Fnac ==
In 1953, he met Max Théret, the other co-founder of Fnac, and the two conceived the idea of forming a new buyers club through a magazine called Contact. Founded a year later in 1954, Fnac was exclusive to its members only, offering sharp discounts on its products, based on the founders socialist principles. Their aim was to improve the lives of the workers, not through higher salaries but through lower prices. In 1974, Fnac began selling books at 80% off the RRP, sparking protests and a law, in 1982, that limited the level of discounts that could be offered on books. He left the company in 1983 and was replaced by Roger Kerinec, the SGCC president.

== Works ==
- I wanted to change the world : memories. - Stock, 1985.
- New edition followed by interviews with Perle Scemla in 2001 in memory of the book. - ISBN 2-913867-29-4
