= Hotel Florida (Madrid) =

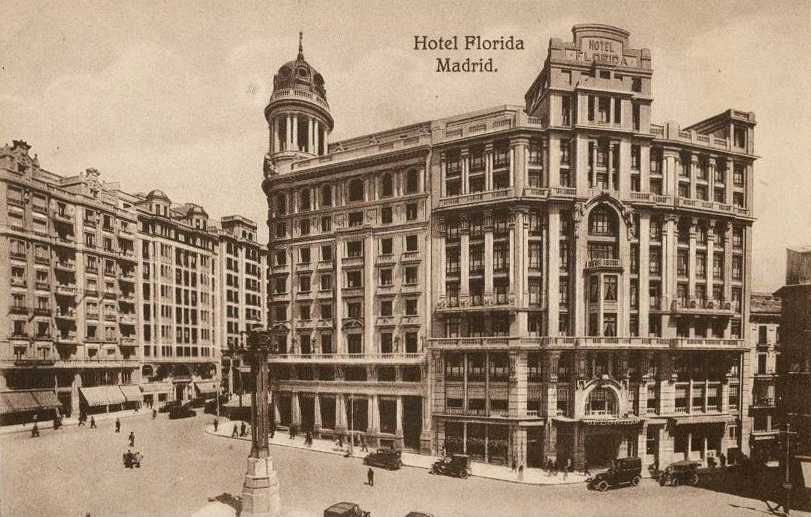
- Hotel Florida (on the right)

- Location within Madrid

General information
- Type: Hotel
- Location: Plaza del Callao 2, Madrid, Spain
- Coordinates: 40°25′11″N 3°42′19″W
- Opened: 1924
- Demolished: 1964

Design and construction
- Architect: Antonio Palacios

The Hotel Florida was situated in Callao Square #2 in central Madrid, Spain. It was built in 1924 and was used as a base by many of the foreign correspondents stationed in Madrid during the Spanish Civil War. While based in Spain as a correspondent for the North American News Association (NANA), Ernest Hemingway stayed at the hotel, where he wrote a play. The hotel was demolished in 1964 and a new building for the Galerías Preciados department store was built on the site.

== History ==
The architect Antonio Palacios designed and built the hotel on a site in the Plaza de Callao, on the Gran Vía (then under construction). It was inaugurated in February 1924. The whole façade of the building was marble.

The hotel's 200 rooms, each with a bathroom, achieved fame during the Civil War, when it became the residence of correspondents, foreign writers and intellectuals featured in Madrid during its siege. Mikhail Koltsov, Geoffrey Cox, Henry Buckley, Ksawery Pruszyński, Wiadomosci Literackie and Herbert L. Matthews were among the members of this community, which also met in the nearby headquarters of Telefónica and the Hotel Gran Vía. For a time Ernest Hemingway and his mistress, later his third wife, Martha Gellhorn used the hotel as their base in Madrid. Hemingway was at the hotel during the Spanish Civil War and on a daily basis he expected a bomb to land on his typewriter. He wrote The Fifth Column during the siege itself.

Photographers Robert Capa with his partner Gerda Taro first met Hemingway at the Florida.

John Dos Passos also passed through the Florida and immortalized his stay in an article called Room with a bathroom in the Hotel Florida, published by Esquire magazine in January 1938. The last such war correspondent staying in Hotel Florida was O. D. Gallagher, sent by the London Daily Express, said to be the only foreigner who waited to see Franco's troops enter Madrid.

The hotel was also a favourite haunt for Frank Tinker and other U.S. mercenary fighter pilots enlisted with the loyalist forces during the civil war, who relished the opportunity to stop by for a hot bath whenever they could make it to Madrid.

In 2006, the Instituto Cervantes y la Fundación Pablo Iglesias opened an exhibition in New York called the "War Correspondents in Spain", covering the work and adventures of many of the people of the Florida.

The reception and main hall of the Hotel Florida were reproduced in the old train station in Oakland, California, for the filming of the HBO production Hemingway & Gellhorn (2012).

== See also ==
- List of missing landmarks in Spain
