= Edificio La Adriática, Madrid =

Edificio La Adriática
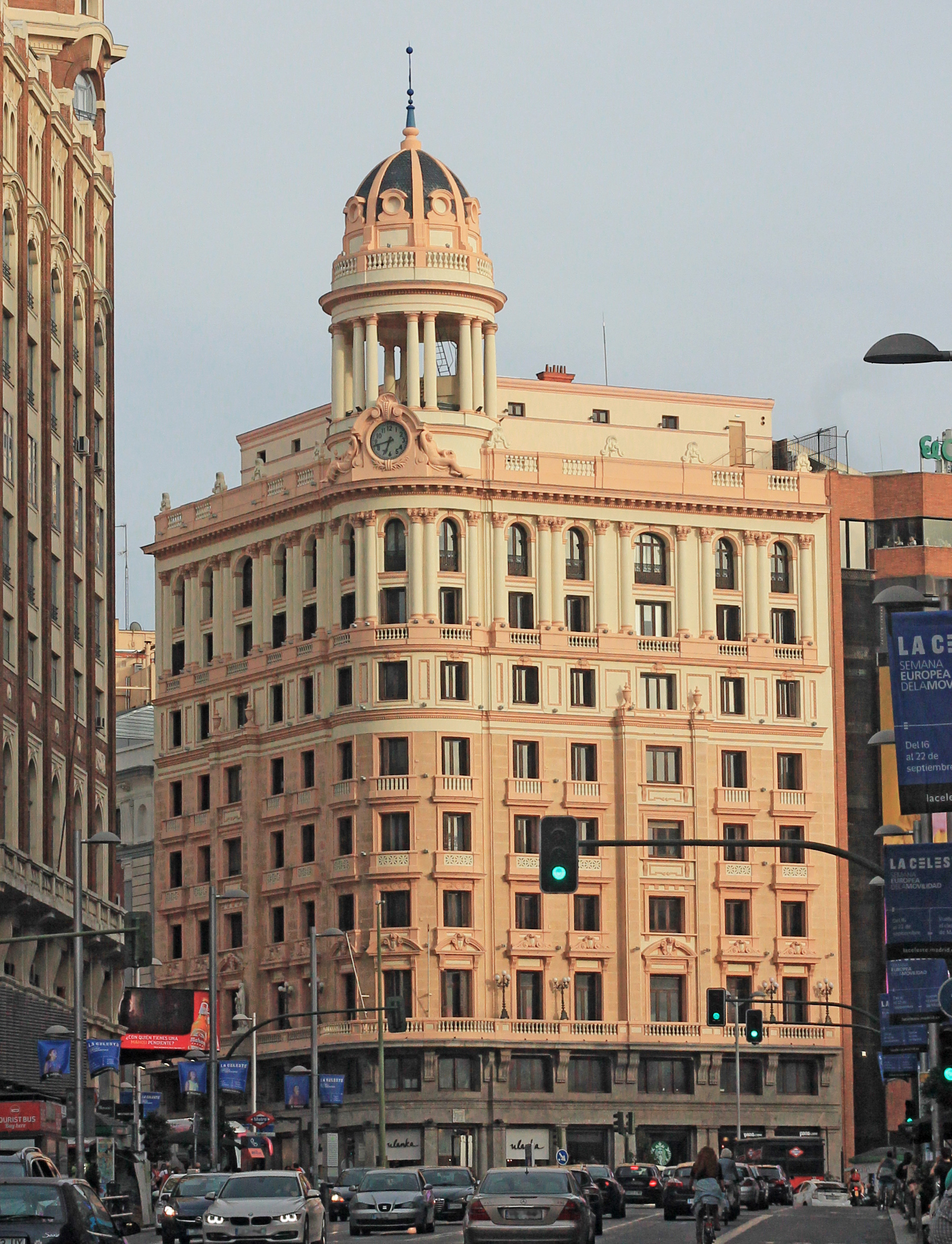

General information
- Architectural style: vaguely Neo-Baroque
- Location: Madrid, Spain
- Construction started: 1926
- Completed: 1928

Design and construction
- Architect: Luis Sanz de los Terreros

The Edificio La Adriatica is a building at Plaza del Callao 3 and Gran Vía 39 in Madrid.

== History and features ==
It was designed by architect Luis Sainz de los Terreros in 1926. The construction took place between 1926 and 1928. It is crowned by a tower which had originally been projected as a never carried out lighthouse. The top of the tower is covered by a dome. Just below the tower two human figures lean up placidly against a clock: a female on the right, the Day; a male on the opposite side, the Night. These two statues are inspired on those sculpted by Michelangelo for the Medici Chapel.

Above the portal there is a large bronze sculpture representing the winged lion of Mark the Evangelist, which constitutes the insignia of the insurance company that gives the building its name. The lion holds a book with the inscription: "Pax tibi Marce, evangelista meus" ("Peace be with you, Mark, my evangelist").

The window on the first floor, just above the portal, is flanked by two human figures about three meters high made of Carrara marble. One of them holds a child on the left arm as a symbol of Protection; the other one holds a coin or ball that he keeps in his right hand as a symbol of Precaution or Savings. These two virtues are usually associated with the insurance industry.

During the postwar period, the shoe store Calzados Segarra was housed in its basement. They provided papers with advertising of their products and it was also a pioneer of coupon codes and sales seasons.

Spanish cupletista Celia Gámez lived on the third floor of this building.

== Gallery ==
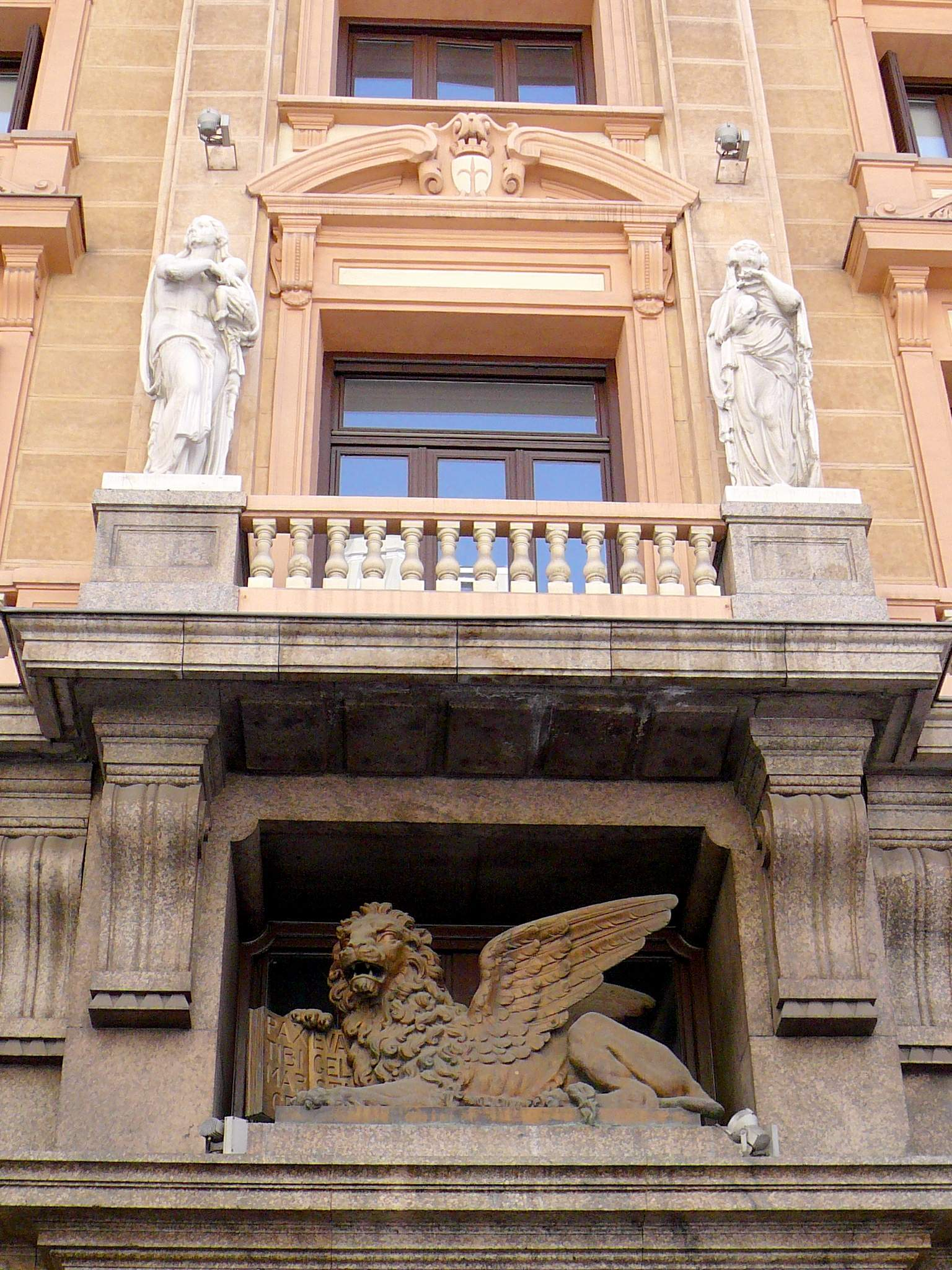
Lion of Saint Mark and statues of Protection and Precaution.

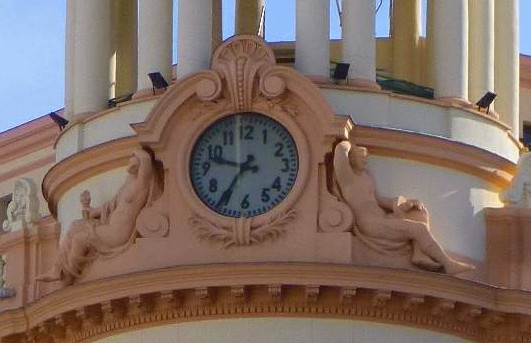
Clock with statues representing Day and Night
