= Ramón Areces =

Spanish businessman (1904–1989)

The Most Excellent Ramón Areces
- Born: Ramón Areces Rodríguez; 15 September 1904; La Mata, Spain
- Died: 30 July 1989 (aged 84); Madrid, Spain
- Occupation: Businessman

Ramón Areces Rodríguez (1904–1989) was a Spanish businessman.

At fifteen, Areces emigrated to Havana, Cuba. There he learned the basics of the business, working at El Encanto department store. He later traveled through the United States and Canada, before returning to Spain. When he returned to Madrid in 1935, he opened up a small tailor shop on the Calle Preciados. Areces used the techniques he learned on his trip, and his business grew, quite unexpectedly. In July 1940 he opened the first El Corte Inglés department store in Madrid.
