= Calle de Preciados =

Pedestrian street in Madrid, Spain

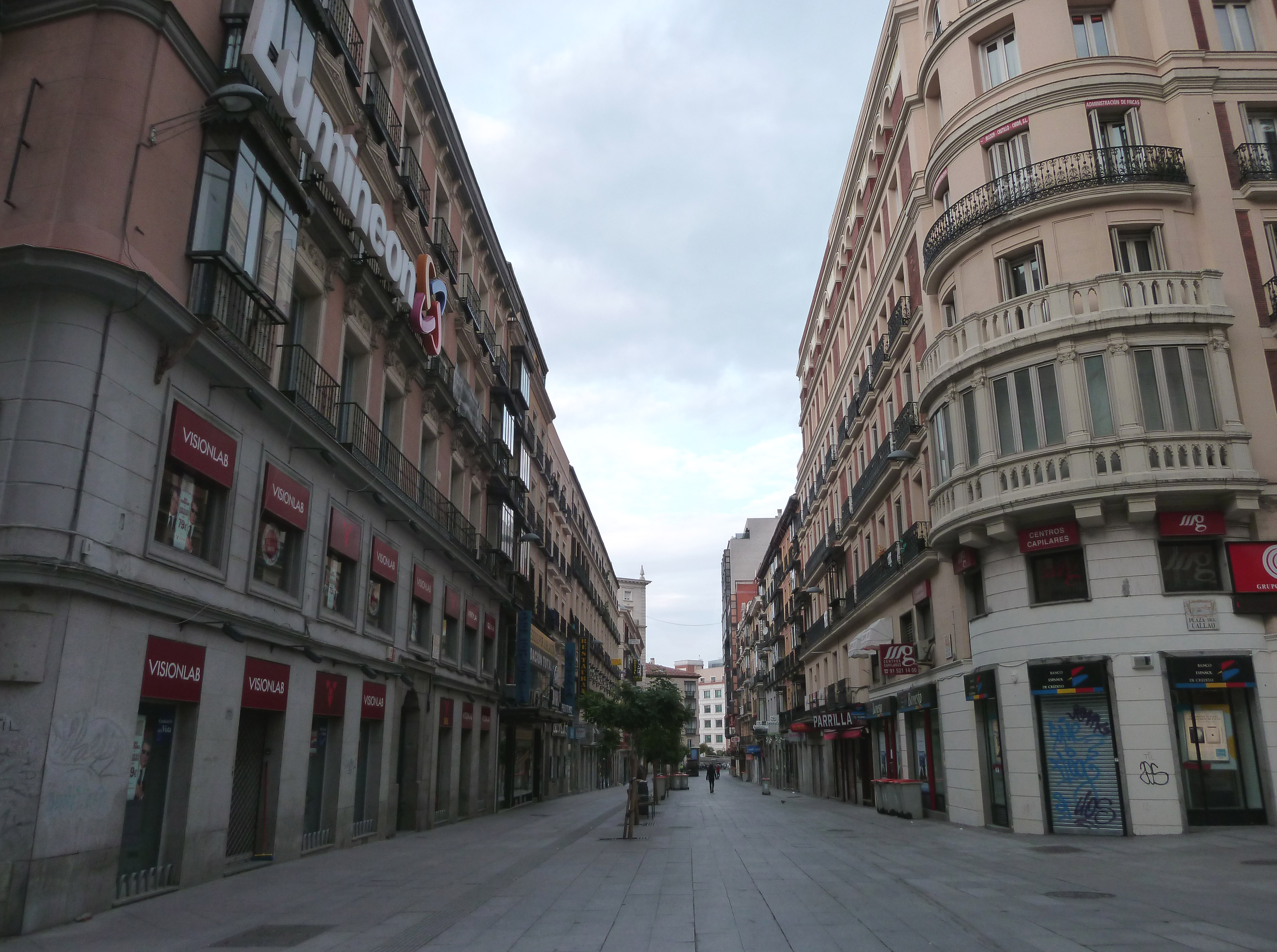
- Interactive map of Calle de Preciados
- Type: Pedestrian street
- Length: 500 m (1,600 ft)
- Location: Sol, Centro, Madrid, Spain
- South end: Puerta del Sol
- Major junctions: Plaza de Callao
- North-West end: Plaza de Santo Domingo

Calle de Preciados (or simply Preciados) is a public pedestrian street in central Madrid, Spain, which spans from Puerta del Sol to Plaza de Santo Domingo via Plaza de Callao, where it takes a bend. It is about 500 metres (1,600 ft) long.

== History ==
The street was built on land previously occupied by the Convent of Las Descalzas Reales and the harvest plots of the convent of San Martín. According to tradition, the name of Preciados (in use at least since the 17th century) comes from two brothers ('the Preciados') who installed in the area after buying plots to monks and thrived by working as almotacenes (an archaic job description pertaining the certification of weights and measures).

Already in 1905, the street was an important retail area, with a predominance of the tailoring and textile sector, shoe and footwear, pharmacy, as well as catering businesses. Throughout the 20th century, commercial activity boosted in the wake of the growth of Galerías Preciados and Corte Inglés department stores (by the purchase of neighbouring businesses). Starting in December 1967, the street started being closed to traffic on a temporary basis for the Christmas season owing to the large flow of pedestrians. On 20 October 1973, the permanent pedestrianisation of the street (together with Calle del Carmen's) was formally inaugurated by Mayor Miguel Ángel García-Lomas. Galerías Preciados could not cope with El Corte Inglés' growth and ended being acquired by its rival in 1995. As of 2018, Preciados is one of the busiest pedestrian streets in Europe.
