= Opencor =

Defunct Spanish convenience store chain

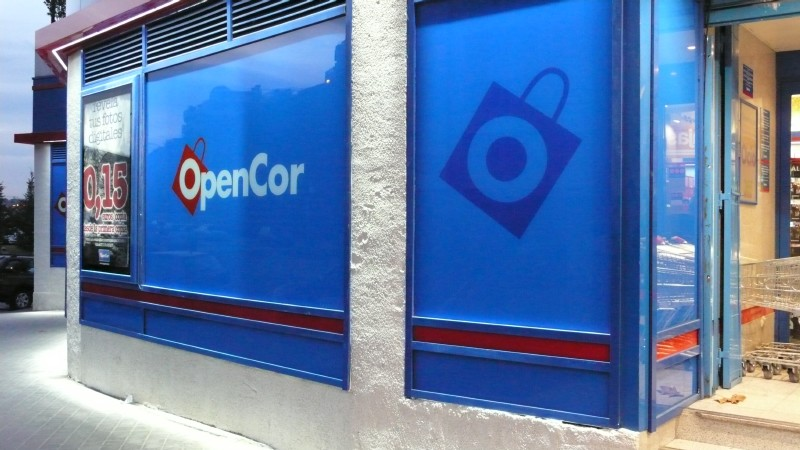
An Opencor store in Aravaca, Madrid

Opencor (branded as OpenCor) was a chain of convenience stores owned and operated by the Spanish department store group El Corte Inglés. Opencor offers products found at most convenience chain stores such as snacks, drinks, quick bites, newspapers and magazines, as well as other items not normally found in convenience store chains such as music CDs, movies and video games.

The first Opencor store opened on 18 May 2000 in the Madrid suburb of Majadahonda. Some Opencor stores are open 24/7, although the majority of said stores open at 7 am or 8 am and close at 1 am or 2 am respectively. Opencor has the distinction of being one of only a few supermarket chains in Spain to operate on Sundays. Opencor also operate stores at Repsol petrol stations under the name Repsol-Opencor.

Between 2011 and 2014, El Corte Inglés converted all Opencor stores to Supercor Exprés.
