= Galerías Preciados =

Galerías Preciados, S.A.
- Type: Sociedad Anónima
- Industry: Retail
- Predecessor: Sociedad Limitada Sederías Carretas
- Founded: April 5, 1943 in Madrid, Spain
- Founder: Pepín Fernández
- Defunct: November 24, 1995
- Fate: Acquired by El Corte Inglés, S.A.
- Headquarters: Madrid, Spain
- Number of locations: 9 stores
- Key people: José María Ruiz Mateos, Owner; Gustavo Cisneros, Owner
- Products: Clothing, footwear, bedding, jewelry, beauty products, housewares

Galerías Preciados, S.A. was a Spanish chain of department stores founded in 1943 by José "Pepín" Fernández Rodríguez. Named after the street on which it stood, Galerías Preciados was, along with El Corte Inglés, one of the economic motors of the retail industry in post-war Spain.

In 1995, the company went into receivership and was subsequently adjudicated to its main rival.

== Stores ==
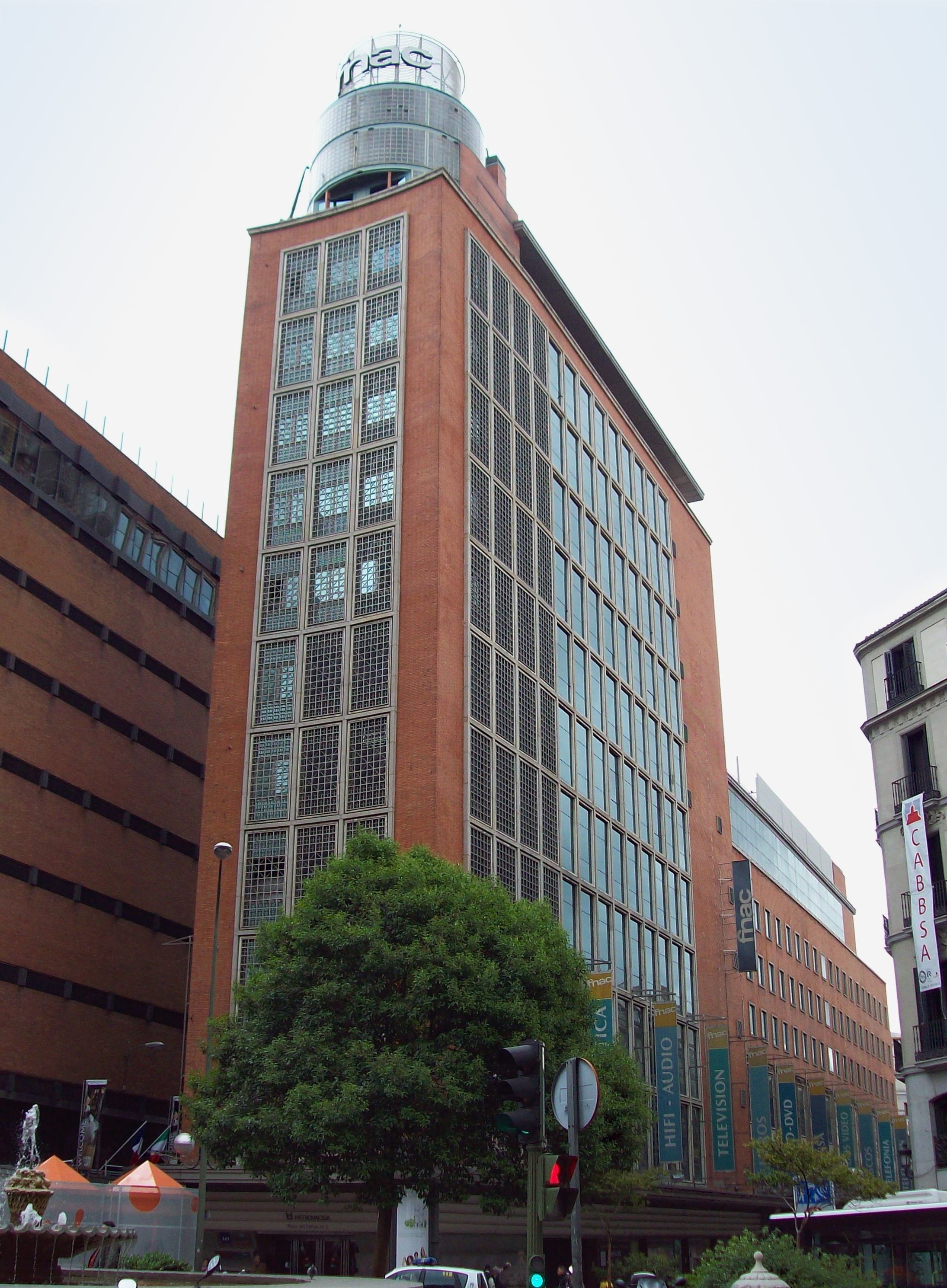
The former Calle Preciados building at Plaza del Callao in Madrid. This building was sold to Fnac in 1993.

- Barcelona
- Cádiz
- Avenida Ronda de los Tejares, Córdoba
- Carrera de la Virgen, Granada
- Plaza de las Monjas, Huelva
- Calle Preciados, Madrid
- Gran Vía, Murcia
- Calle de Uria, Oviedo
- Paseo de la Independencia, Zaragoza
- Calle San Pablo/Calle Méndez Núñez, Sevilla
- Plaza de la Magdalena/Calle O´Donnell, Sevilla
- Calle Constitución, Valladolid

== See also ==
- SEPU
