= Max Théret =

- Born: 6 January 1913; Paris, France
- Died: 25 February 2009 (aged 96)
- Occupations: Entrepreneur, Political activist
- Known for: Co-founder of Fnac

Max Théret (6 January 1913 – 25 February 2009) was the co-founder of Fnac, originally Fédération nationale d’achats des cadres, or National Purchasing Federation for Middle Managers, alongside André Essel. He was also a freemason antifascist activist and a believer in Trotskyism.

== Political career ==
Before the rise of the extreme right, Théret often engaged with street battles against French Stalinists during the years following the death of Vladimir Lenin and the intense power struggle between Joseph Stalin and Leon Trotsky.

Between 1936 and 1939, Théret joined the battle against Francisco Franco in the Spanish Civil War. After which he returned to France, where he met with Trotsky who was in exile, and became his informal bodyguard.

During the Second World War he fought for the French army, and joined the resistance during the Occupation, helping to distribute leftist newspapers.

== Forming of Fnac ==
Théret had a passion for photography which originally began in 1932. When hunted by the Gestapo, Théret left the Occupied Zone in 1942, moving to Grenoble, where he took up photography as a career. After the war, he trained as a photo laboratory technician, founded his own laboratory, and later constructed the first colour-processing machine in France. In 1951, while working for the PTT telephone company, he founded Economie Nouvelle, a buying group that arranged discounts for members on products sold through participating merchants.

In 1953, he met André Essel, the other co-founder of Fnac, and the two conceived the idea of forming a new buyers club through a magazine called Contact. Founded a year later in 1954, Fnac was exclusive to its members only, offering sharp discounts on its products, based on the founders' socialist principles. Their aim was to improve the lives of the workers, not through higher salaries but through lower prices. In 1974, Fnac began selling books at 80% off the Recommended Retail Price, sparking protests and a law in 1982 that limited the level of discounts that could be offered on books. He left the company in 1981.

== Sources ==
- FNAC World Retail Congress Hall of Fame Biographies
- The Times: Max Théret: French businessman and founder of the FNAC stores
