= Isidoro Álvarez =

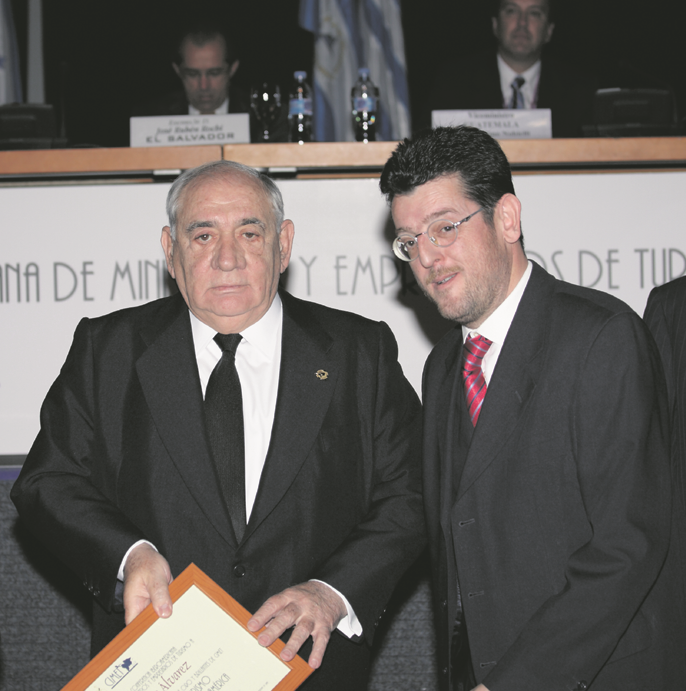
- Born: 11 May 1935; Báscones, Spain
- Died: 14 September 2014 (aged 79); Madrid, Spain
- Occupation: Businessman

Isidoro Álvarez (11 May 1935 – 14 September 2014) was a Spanish businessman and CEO of El Corte Inglés, where he worked for 60 years, 25 of which as chairman.

Álvarez died on 14 September 2014 from respiratory problems.
