= Fnac =

French retail chain

- Type: Division
- Industry: Retail
- Founded: 1954
- Founder: André Essel; Max Théret
- Headquarters: Ivry-sur-Seine, France
- Number of locations: 184 (2015)
- Area served: Company shops: France, Tunisia, Portugal, Spain, Andorra, Switzerland and Luxembourg; Franchised: Morocco, Qatar, Ivory Coast, Cameroon, Belgium and Congo
- Key people: Enrique Martinez (CEO)
- Products: Audio; Books; CDs; DVDs; Electronics; Games
- Services: Photography; Ticket sales
- Revenue: €7,3 billion (2019)
- Net income: €188 million (2010)
- Number of employees: 14,364
- Parent: Fnac Darty
- Subsidiaries: Contact Magazine; Fnac.com; Fnac Éveil & Jeux; Fnac Voyages; Le Pôle Spectacles
- Website: fnac.com

Fnac (French pronunciation: [fnak]) is a French multinational retail chain specializing in the sale of entertainment media and consumer electronics.

Fnac was founded by André Essel and Max Théret in 1954. Its headquarters is located in Le Flavia in Ivry-sur-Seine near Paris. Its name is an abbreviation of Fédération Nationale d'Achats des Cadres ("National Purchasing Federation for Executives"). It merged with Darty in 2016 to become Groupe Fnac Darty. Fnac became a Public limited company on the Paris stock exchange in 1980.

== History ==
Max Théret had a passion for photography which began in 1932. Hunted by the Gestapo, Théret left the Occupied Zone in 1942, moving to Grenoble, where he took up photography as a career. After the war, he trained as a photo laboratory technician, founded his own laboratory, and later constructed the first colour-processing machine in France. In 1951, while working for the telephone company, he founded Economie Nouvelle, a membership discount buying group for products sold through participating merchants.

In 1952, Théret and André Essel conceived a new magazine-based buyers club. Founded 1954, Fnac was a members-only discount buyers' club, offering sharp discounts on commercial and consumer products, based on the founders' socialist principles. Their aim was to improve the lives of the workers, not through higher salaries but through lower prices.

The first shop was opened in a sublet, a second-floor apartment on the rue de Sebastopol in Paris on July 31, 1954.

The brand positioning of the company continued with the training of sales assistants in their product categories, with purchases being guaranteed for one year. Furthermore, all products were tested in the company's independent test centre before sale. The test centre would check for technical quality, ease of use, price, and value for money ("rapport qualité-prix"), and all results were published in the company's free members' magazine Contact, which today can also be found advertised in store. In addition, staff were expected to do more than just sell their products but offer advice to customers and, beginning in 1957, blacklist any unsatisfactory products, such as those with technical difficulties. By the end of its first full year of operation the company saw revenues of 50 million old francs. In 1957, it was selling televisions, hi-fis, recording equipment, radios and records.

=== 1960s and 1970s ===
In 1966, the Fnac store was opened to non-members and began to expand, opening its second store, also in Paris on the avenue de Wagram, near the Arc de Triomphe in 1969. By this time, the company had 580 employees.

The 1970s saw further expansion for Fnac, as the company began opening shops in the French provinces outside Paris and a third in the city itself that sold books, the newest addition to the product range. The founders of the company sold 40 percent of the company to insurance firm Union des Assurances de Paris (now Axa) to raise money to fund growth. In turn, the insurance firm sold 16 percent of its shares to investment bank Banque de Paris et des Pays Bas (later Banque Paribas) in 1972.

In 1974, the company began selling books at 80% of the recommended retail price, sparking protests from publishers, writers and independent booksellers alike, who could not benefit from the economies of scale. This prompted government action in 1982 with the so-called 'anti-Fnac' law, that was signed to limit discounts on books to a maximum of five percent. In 1975, videos were added to the product range.

Towards the late 1970s, Fnac continued to expand by building 12 stores in Paris and other cities throughout France. In 1977, the remaining shares of the company's founders were sold to the Société Génerale des Cooperatives de Consommation (SGCC, the financial arm of the Coop retailing group) to raise more capital.

=== 1980s and 1990s ===
FNAC became a Public limited company on the Paris stock exchange in 1980 when 25 percent of the company was offered to the public. SGCC, however, maintained a 51 percent control of the company, which now employed more than 2,700 and was declaring turnover of FFr 2.2 billion.

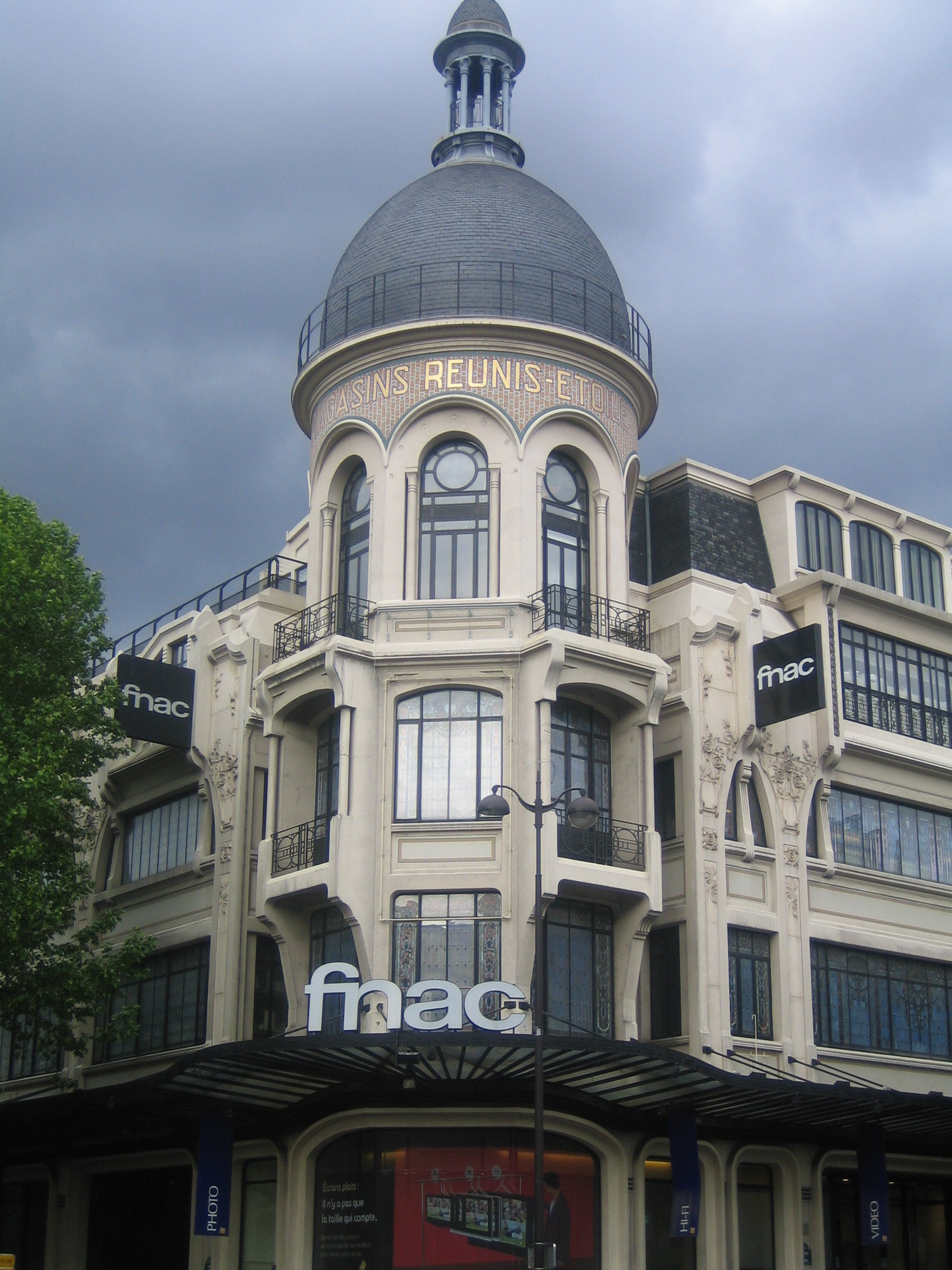
26-30 Avenue des Ternes, 17th arrondissement of Paris, France

Théret left the company in 1981.

In 1981, FNAC opened a store in Brussels, Belgium under the management of Sodal, a joint-venture between FNAC (40 percent) and the GIB Group (60 percent). The GIB Group later added three more stores in the mid-1980s, in Ghent, Antwerp, and Liège.

In 1983, Essel retired and was replaced by the then SGCC president Roger Kerinec.

In 1985, SGCC sold its shares to the insurance group Garantie Mutuelle des Fonctionnaires (GMF) due to growing competition from the French hypermarket and discount chains such as Carrefour and E.Leclerc. Michel Barouin, GMF's president and director general, took these positions at FNAC as well. In 1987, Barouin disappeared in an airplane accident and Jean-Louis Petriat was named to lead both GMF and FNAC.

In 1988, the first Virgin Megastore opened in Paris. Petriat announced a FFr 1.5 billion plan to add 15 new stores to the 31-store chain and double the company's gross revenues, in order to compete with the new entrant to the French market. Petriat also had plans to expand into the German market. By this point, sales of compact discs and other recordings had joined books as the company's most important sources of revenue.

During the late 1980s, Petriat added a music distribution division following the purchase of Wotre Music Distribution (WMD). In January 1991, Fnac Music was formed. Petriat hoped to build the first French multinational record company, with plans to capture as much as five percent of the market.

The 1990s brought fierce competition after the arrival of HMV and Virgin Megastores in 1988 as well as the strength of hypermarkets. The company responded by cutting its prices and stepping up the competition, which forced HMV to leave France after only six months. Virgin Megastores remained in the French market, and decided to open two more stores in addition to its original store in Paris. In response to the megastore, as seen to the right, Fnac spent around $23 million to build its own megastore, at 32,000 square metres, more than twice the size of the Virgin megastore, which became known as "the Cathedral".

In 1991, the first Fnac store was opened in Berlin continuing with Petriat's plans, this was close to the original Virgin megastore, which opened there only a few months earlier.

In 1992, the fate of FNAC Librairie Internationale, featuring books in languages other than French, was sealed and closed after only a year of trading. This store was converted to a computer products-only concept, called FNAC Micro, which proved more successful.

In 1993, the first Fnac store was opened in Madrid, Spain. However, the FNAC Music subsidiary, while posting some successes, failed to live up to the company's expectations and was unable to gain more than a two percent market share and was eventually sold off the distribution arm WMD, which shut down FNAC Music in 1994.

Despite some failures, the company revealed growing revenues though shrinking profits in the early 1990s, also attributed to the recession in the French economy. In 1991 the company recorded gross sales of FFr 7.4 billion, while profits fell approximately FFr 55 million, to FFr 159.5 million. The following year, despite a rise in revenues to FFr 8.9 billion, the company's net income dropped to FFr 31.9 million.

The falling profits for Fnac was a similar situation to the parent company, GMF whose share count totalled more than 80 percent. To raise more capital, GMF agreed to sell its shares of FNAC in July 1993 to Altus Finances, a subsidiary of government-owned Crédit Lyonnais, and Phenix, a property group owned by French waterworks company Compagnie Générale des Eaux, for FFr 2.4 billion. The deal came under scrutiny by the Commission des opérations de bourse (COB) though was allowed to proceed in September 1993. Crédit Lyonnais became the majority shareholder, with 64 percent of shares, while Générale des Eaux held 34 percent. The remaining two percent of shares continued to be publicly owned.

In 1994, Crédit Lyonnais announced it was going to sell its 64 percent share of the company as part of a FFr 20 billion asset-reduction plan. In July 1994, the Altus Finances subsidiary agreed to sell the majority stake in FNAC for FFr 1.9 billion to François Pinault, the largest shareholder in and architect of Pinault-Printemps-Redoute.

Since 1994, PPR or Pinault-Printemps-Redoute has been the majority shareholder of Fnac and the company was led by François-Henri Pinault, son of the parent company's head François Pinault. The new ownership saw the closure of the WMD and FNAC Music subsidiaries and instead concentrated on further expansion of its retail chain. In 1995, the company added its 45th French store, while a second Spanish store, in Barcelona was opened in 1996. In 1995, the Fnac store was closed in Berlin and the company instead continued its international expansion in Belgium, which were now becoming profitable.

In October 1996, the new parent company assumed full control of the Belgian affiliate and announced plans to double the number of stores in Belgium that began with the opening of a fifth store in 1997. In March 1996, François-Henri, was named chairman of Fnac and opened two stores in France. At this point, Fnac had revenues passing FFr 10 billion and net earnings of FFr 200 million.

In 1999, the first Fnac store outside Europe was opened in São Paulo, Brazil.

=== 2000s ===
In april 2000, Fnac acquired Surcouf, an IT specialist. However, a few years later, in 2008, due to Fnac's desire to reposition itself, the Surcouf brand was put up for sale.

In 2013, Kering (formerly PPR) spun off Fnac as an independent company.

In 2016, FNAC Darty formed.

In 2017, Fnac Darty launched into online advertising with the sale of its own web spaces to advertisers. In particular, the group set up a specialised department in January, headed by Arnauld de Saint Pastou. In May 2017, Fnac launched its own bank card, called Fnac Mastercard, in partnership with Crédit Agricole and Consumer Finance.

In July 2017, Enrique Martinez and Jacques Veyrat became the new bosses of Fnac and replaced Alexandre Bompard, who left for Carrefour. Veyrat, chairman of the investment company Impala, became chairman of the board of directors, while Martinez, who previously headed the Northern Europe region at Fnac Darty, was appointed CEO of the company.

In February 2018, the French Property and Casualty Insurance Company (Sfam) became the second largest shareholder in the Fnac Darty group.

In August 2018, the UFC-Que choisir announces filing a complaint for "deceptive marketing practices".

In June 2019, the company was fined 10 million euros for "deceptive marketing practices". Customers buying a phone in a FNAC store are indeed offered a refund offer of 30 euros, which leads them to leave their bank details to enjoy, signing unknowingly an insurance contract mixed documents. It then commits them for one year to pay 15.99 euros per month, with monthly payments then rising to 37.99 euros. Customers are often not aware of the situation until several months later.

In April 2020, following the outbreak of the COVID-19 pandemic, Fnac was the first large French company to tap a government-guaranteed loan (500 million euro).

In 2024, FNAC opens its first café at Gare du Nord.

== Operations ==
As of October 2018, the company owns stores in France, Belgium, Portugal, Spain, and Switzerland, and franchises in Luxembourg, Morocco, Qatar, Ivory Coast, Cameroon, Senegal and the Republic of Congo.

=== Belgium ===
Fnac operates thirteen stores in Belgium, located in Aalst, Antwerp (two stores, including one in the outskirts of Wijnegem), Bruges, Brussels (three stores), Charleroi, Ghent, Hasselt, Leuven, Louvain-La-Neuve and Liège.

=== Brazil ===
At the height of its popularity in Brazil, there were twelve Fnac stores. In July 2017, all Fnac operations in Brazil were transferred to Livraria Cultura. In October 2018, all shops were closed and online operations ceased.

=== Italy ===
Fnac operated several stores in Italy since 2000 in cities like Bologna, Milan, and Rome. In 2014, they all closed and their ownership was transferred to Orlando Italy fund.

=== Luxembourg ===
Fnac operates as a franchise within the Grand Duchy of Luxembourg, its webstore operates through the Belgian platform.

=== Monaco ===
Fnac operates a single store in Monaco, in the Métropole shopping centre.

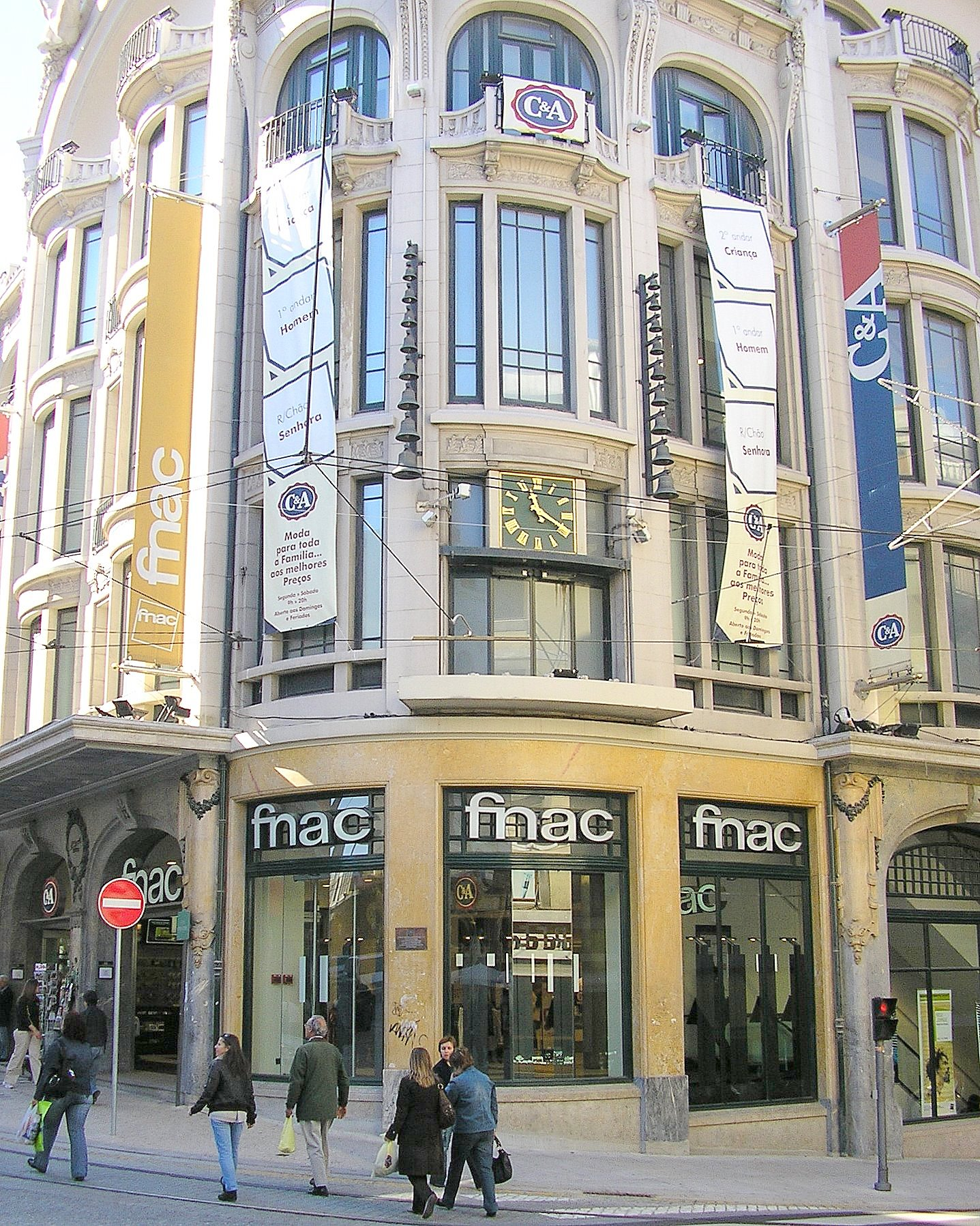
Fnac in Porto (Portugal)

=== Morocco ===
In 2011, Fnac opened its first store in Africa, located in Morocco Mall in Casablanca, Morocco. In 2017, Fnac opened their second store in Morocco, located in Ibn Batouta Mall in Tangier. In 2018, they opened Fnac Anfa located in the city centre of Casablanca.

=== Portugal ===
There are 42 Fnac stores in Portugal, including: Colombo (Lisbon), NorteShopping (Matosinhos), Armazéns do Chiado (Lisbon), CascaiShopping (Cascais), Oeiras Parque (Oeiras), Almada Fórum (Almada), GaiaShopping (Gaia), AlgarveShopping (Albufeira), Intermarche Lagos (Lagos), Forum Coimbra (Coimbra), MadeiraShopping (Funchal), Braga Parque (Braga), Alegro Alfragide (Alfragide), Palácio do Gelo (Viseu), MarShopping-IKEA (Matosinhos), Vasco da Gama (Lisbon), GuimarãeShopping (Guimarães), LeiriaShopping (Leiria), Lisbon Airport (Lisbon), Alegro Setúbal (Setúbal), Fórum Montijo (Montijo), Évora Plaza (Évora), UBBO (Amadora), Amoreiras Shopping (Lisbon), Fórum Algarve (Faro), Faro Airport (Faro), MarShopping Algarve (Loulé)), Avenida de Roma (Lisbon), Instituto Superior Técnico (Lisbon), Intermarche Malveira (Malveira), Arena Shopping (Torres Vedras), Torreshopping (Torres Novas)), Alegro Castelo Branco (Castelo Branco), Fórum Aveiro (Aveiro), Alameda Shop & Spot (Porto), Porto Airport (Maia), Penafiel Retail Park (Penafiel), Nosso Shopping (Vila Real), Estação Viana Shopping (Viana do Castelo) and Alegro Sintra (Sintra). There's also 2 Fnac stores with distinct concepts in Lisbon, one smaller Fnac (Fnac Connect) in Atrium Saldanha and a Nature & Decouvertes store in Amoreiras Shopping. Fnac is also building two new stores in (Covilhã) and (Ponta Delgada), (Azores), the first in the region. The company is also planning to open new Connect stores around the country. Also a website (fnac.pt), which was the most popular commercial website in Portugal in 2007.

=== Qatar ===
There are two FNAC stores in the capital Doha: one in Lagoona Mall, the other one in Doha Festival City.

=== Spain ===
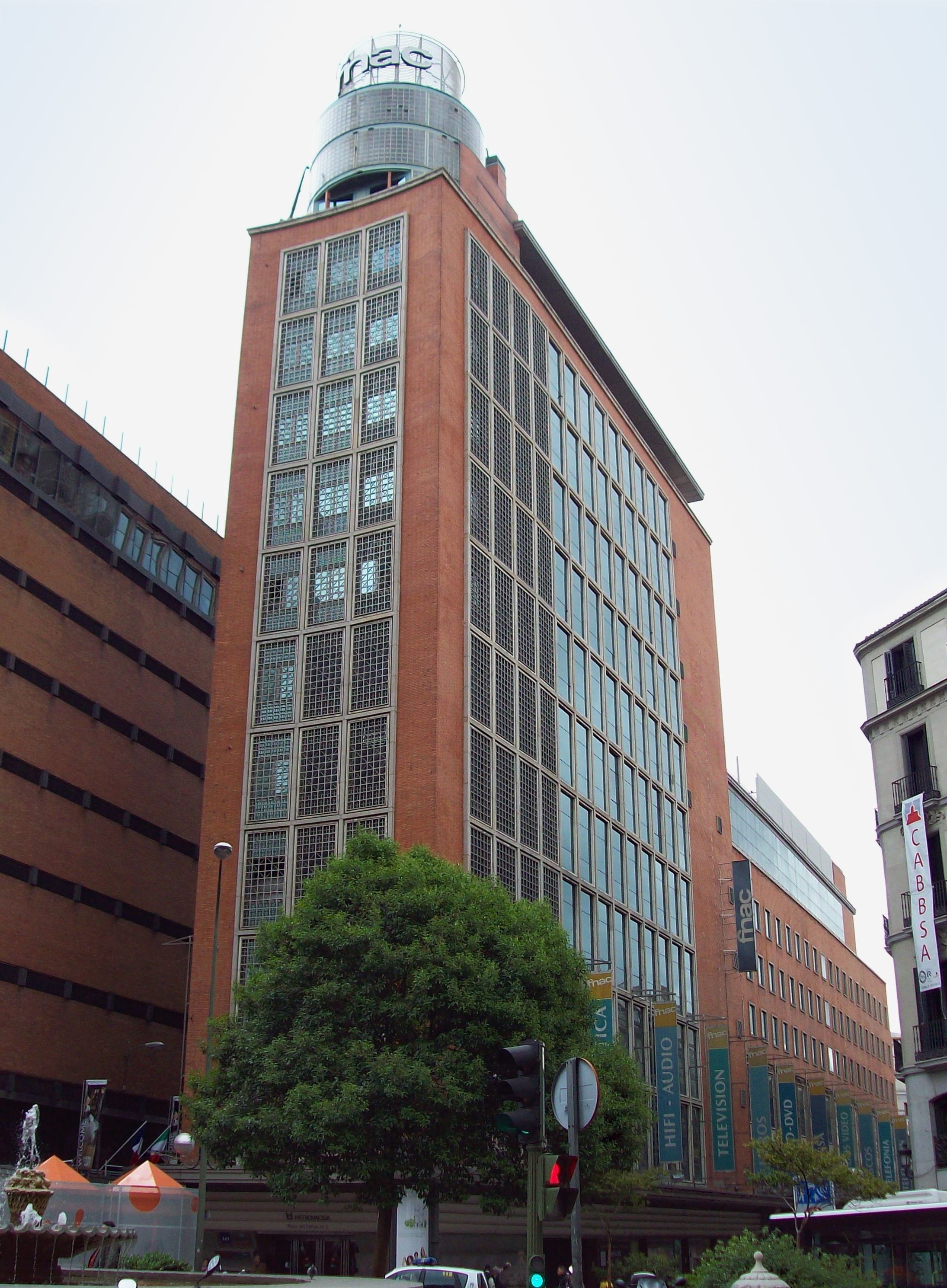
Fnac in Plaza de Callao, Madrid, Spain (formerly a Galerías Preciados department store until 1993)

There are 26 Fnac stores in Spain, including: Plaza Callao (Madrid), L'illa (Barcelona), San Agustín (Valencia), Triangle (Barcelona), Coso (Zaragoza), Bulevar (Alicante), Parque Principado (Oviedo), Diagonal Mar (Barcelona), La Cañada (Marbella, Málaga), Plaza (Marbella, Málaga), Plaza Norte (San Sebastián de los Reyes, Madrid), ParqueSur (Leganés, Madrid), Donostia (San Sebastián), Nueva Condomina (Murcia), Bilbao (Bilbao), Praza de Lugo (Corunna), Centro Comercial Larios Centro (Málaga), Plaza Imperial (Zaragoza), Centro Comercial Rio Shopping (Valladolid) La Gavia (Madrid), Paseo de la Castellana (Madrid) and Centro Comercial La Morea (Pamplona). The headquarters is located in Pozuelo de Alarcón, Madrid.

=== Switzerland ===
As of 2018, there are six Fnac stores in Switzerland, two in Geneva, one in Lausanne, one in Fribourg, one in Conthey and one in Neuchâtel.

=== Tunisia ===
Fnac operates two stores in Tunisia. The first one opened in 2018 in Tunis, and the second in 2019 in Sousse.

== Loyalty programme ==
Fnac operates a loyalty programme offering points that are awarded each time the card is presented at the till-point, for each euro spent. A membership fee applies. For every 4,000 points earned, a gift card worth €10 is issued to the card holder. As of 2008, the programme has 1.8 million members, with the loyalty card also serving as a credit card. As of 2008, there are two versions of the card, a one-year membership card or alternatively a three-year membership card. The membership card offers a 5% discount on hardware, books and various monthly offers.

== Product range ==
Fnac stores stock a range of products from audio, books, CDs, computer software and hardware, DVDs, televisions and video games. Some stores also operate services of photography and ticket sales. The company also offers a selection of more expensive consumer products positioning themselves above discount retailers.

== Head office ==
Fnac head office, 16 quai Marcel Boyer, Ivry-sur-Seine

Fnac's head office is in Le Flavia in Ivry-sur-Seine, France. The 6 story building was designed by Jean-Claude Besseau and has 16,400 square metres (177,000 sq ft) of space. The building is a part of the Ivry Port project.

Previously the company head office was located in Clichy-la-Garenne, Hauts-de-Seine. Around 2006 there were rumors stating that Fnac would move to Wissous. In 2008 the head office moved to Ivry-sur-Seine. The subsidiary Fnac.com moved from Aubervilliers to Ivry during the same year.

== Culture ==
Fnac holds "forums" throughout the year, which are opportunities for customers to have dialogue with people such as Pedro Almodóvar, George Lucas, and David Cronenberg, discussions with authors including Paul Auster, Pierre Bourdieu, and Françoise Giroud in addition to concerts. Musicians playing in these concerts have included Yann Tiersen, Ben Harper, Keane and David Bowie.

Each year a "book fair" is held with discussions among writers, politicians and the public. Topics related to literature, culture, society and the sciences are discussed. Since 2001 the company has also annually presented an award, Le prix du roman Fnac, whose winners are chosen by a panel of booksellers and members. Dominique Mainard, Pierre Charras and Pierre Péju are among those who have won. These events are shown on the company website fnaclive.com (in French).

The company claims to be committed to defending the diversity of music. In February 2002, Fnac published with UPFI (Union des Producteurs Phonographiques Français Indépendants) "Manifeste pour la diversité musicale", as a prelude to a policy of favorable treatment for independent labels and their artists. Fnac publishes "Indétendances," a compilation of ten artists bimonthly published by independent labels, which it set aside part of its listening kiosks in stores to promote their work.

== In popular culture ==
In the 1995 Spanish horror-comedy "El Día de la Bestia" (Eng. The Day of the Beast), the main character Ángel is caught trying to steal a book from the Fnac store in Callao Square in Madrid.

The story of the 2005 Spanish thriller Mar rojo, starring Maribel Verdú, begins with an armed robbery at a Fnac store in Barcelona.

== Controversies ==
=== Conviction for Deceptive Commercial Practices ===
In February 2018, the French multi-risk insurance company SFAM (Société française d'assurances multirisques) became the second-largest shareholder in the retail group Fnac Darty. On 30 August 2018, the consumer advocacy group UFC-Que Choisir filed a complaint against SFAM, alleging deceptive commercial practices.

In June 2019, SFAM was fined €10 million by the French authorities for misleading business practices.

Customers who purchased smartphones at Fnac stores were reportedly offered a €30 reimbursement, which required them to provide their bank details. Unbeknownst to many, this process included signing up for an insurance contract, binding them to a subscription of €15.99 per month, which later increased to €37.99. Many customers only became aware of the charges several months later.

=== Withdrawal and Reinstatement of a Board Game ===
On 28 November 2022, Fnac—founded in 1954 by two members of the French Resistance, André Essel and Max Théret—announced it was removing the board game Antifa, le jeu from its stores and online platform. The game, created by the antifascist collectives La Horde and Libertalia, faced criticism from Grégoire de Fournas, a Member of Parliament for the far-right National Rally (Rassemblement national), and from the National Police Commissioners' Union.

Following backlash on social media—including reminders that the retailer continued to offer more controversial items, such as books by naturopath Irène Grosjean and a reissue of Mein Kampf from a far-right publisher—Fnac reversed its decision the following day. The company stated that the game contained "nothing that would justify refusing to sell it."

=== Use of Algorithmic Video Surveillance ===
In July 2023, investigative outlet StreetPress reported that several retail chains, including Fnac, E.Leclerc, Carrefour, G20, Coopérative U, Biocoop, and Kiabi, had unlawfully deployed an AI-powered video surveillance system developed by the French company Veesion. The technology analyzes customer behavior to detect potential shoplifting.

According to StreetPress, this deployment violated the French law of 19 May 2023 related to the 2024 Olympic and Paralympic Games, which only authorizes algorithmic surveillance in spaces hosting events, their surroundings, or public transport.

The system was also criticized by La Quadrature du Net, which argued that the collection of biometric data—such as facial imagery—without proper consent contravenes the General Data Protection Regulation (GDPR). The CNIL (France's data protection authority) had reportedly reminded retailers of the illegality of such surveillance technologies in supermarkets.

On 21 June 2024, the Conseil d'État (France's highest administrative court) rejected Veesion's request to suspend CNIL's compliance order and dismissed its claim for €4,000 in court costs. The court ruled that the company's surveillance technology was not compliant with GDPR requirements regarding the detection of shoplifting.
