= Iglesia del Buen Suceso =

Church building in Madrid, Spain

Coordinates: 40°25′0.69″N 3°42′9.48″W

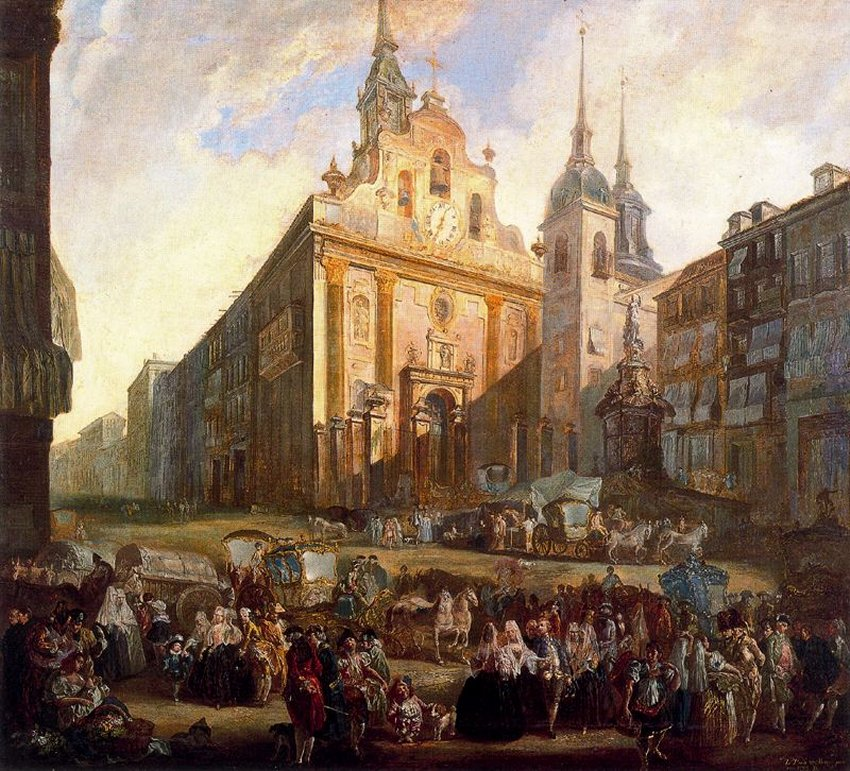
Image of the Iglesia del Buen Suceso, and at right the Convento de Nuestra Señora de las Victorias.

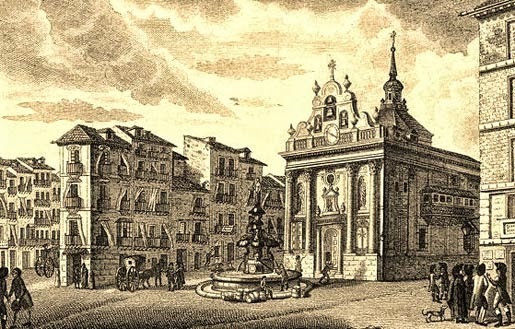
Drawing of 1790 with Fountain del Buen Suceso (on top of it was the Mariblanca) and behind the church Iglesia del Buen Suceso between calle de Alcalá and Carrera de San Jerónimo. To left starts calle Montera. Madrid.

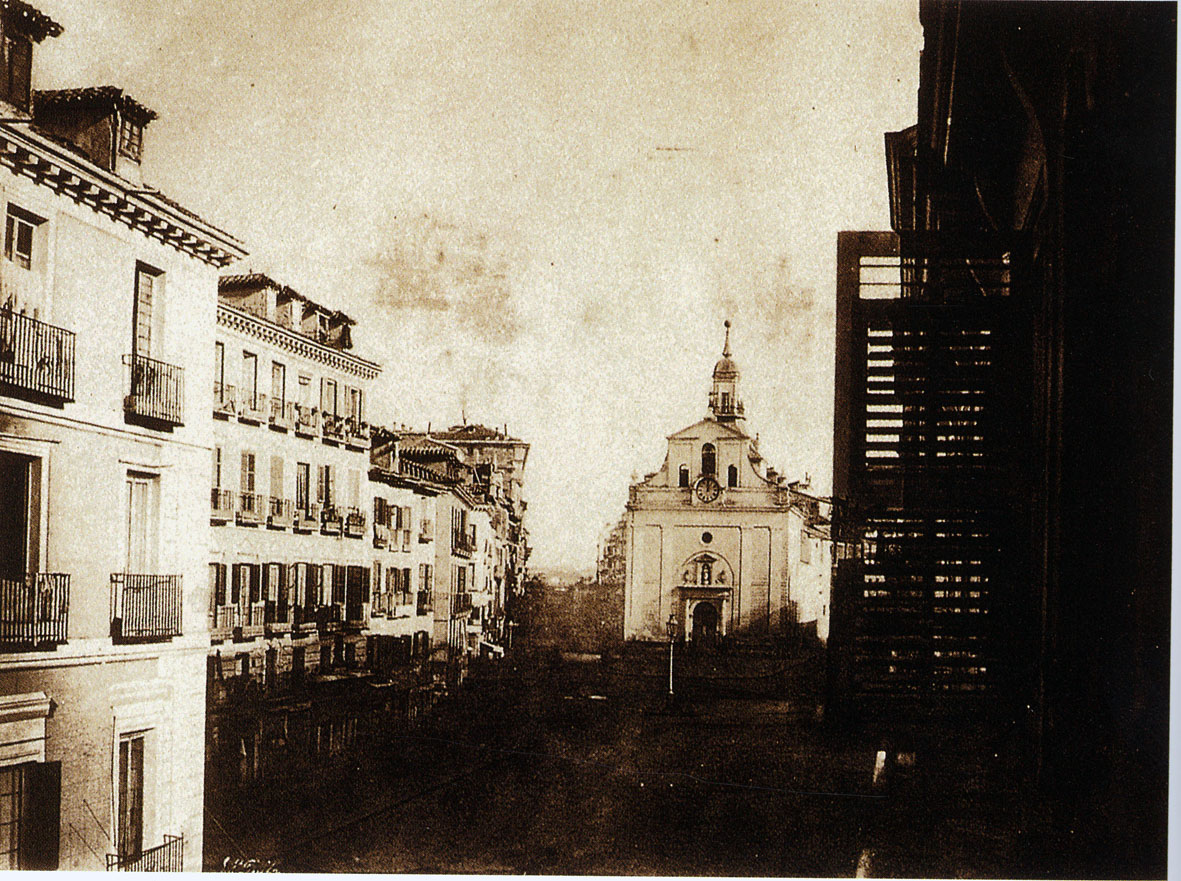
Image of the Church in the Puerta del Sol to background in 1854 (just before the big reform of the Puerta del Sol).

The Iglesia de Nuestra Señora del Buen Suceso, commonly known as Iglesia del Buen Suceso was a church of Madrid that delimited the eastern part of the Puerta del Sol (Madrid). The church comes from a remodeling of the Hospital Real de la Corte (Royal Hospital of the Court) (built in 1483). Was doing functions of church and hospital since 1590. Its lonja was meeting place for several centuries. The church's clock would be important during this period until it was installed one of better performance on the Real Casa de Correos. Its demolition coincided with the Confiscation of Mendizábal that left space for the later expansion that was done for the Puerta del Sol.

Archaeological remains of various parts of the church were found beneath it in 2006, during an extension of the Madrid Metro connecting Sol Metro Station with Cercanías Madrid, causing a 6-month delay in construction. The remains were later restored and displayed in Sol Station.

== History ==
This building was founded by Pious Bernardino de Obregón, founder of the Hospital of the Buen Suceso in the Villa of Madrid, and married with Catalina de Pareja, (daughter of Antón de Pareja, alcaide of Zambrana y Rute and of María Díez), and granddaughter of Gonzalo de Pareja, married in Baena with Isabel Ramírez (daughter of Francisco Ramírez, Captain General of Granada).

The history of this building has been investigated by many scholars: Antonio Palomino, Ponz, Madoz, Mesonero Romanos, and Ramón Gómez de la Serna. The area had been the location of neon sign advertising "Tío Pepe" between Calle de Alcalá and Carrera de San Jerónimo, and was once occupied by a hospital. There were successive constructions and renovations of the building. Some authors suggest that the Philip II did the design during its stay in Valladolid between 1601 and 1607. Although the idea that Francisco de Mora could be a primary ideador of the first building.

=== Moving of Hospital to Madrid ===
Its origin is in a traveling hospital that accompanied the Spanish Court, the Hospital Real de la Corte, which was founded by the Catholic Monarchs in Baza in 1489. The mission of that Hospital was to attend diseases and accidents that had the Courtiers surrounding the King. The emperor Charles V, Holy Roman Emperor it moved definitively to the fledgling city of Madrid, sending build outside the City Walls, next to the Puerta del Sol. Its foundation was confirmed in 1529, in a papal bull of Pope Clement VII dated 28 January 1529, in which, after appointing the Administrator, he recognised the power to reform and re-enact any pious statutes and lawful and honest ordinances not contrary to the Sacred Canons.

The hospital is built in the area that was in the eastern part of Puerta del Sol, a space that had been occupied by the old Hermitage and shrine of San Andrés. Other authors mention the existence of a parish of Corpus Christi.) The construction is made with little homogeneity and this feature makes that from the beginning be a building much needed of constant reforms. Its conditioning as sanitary facilities was made slowly and in 1561 the hospital was complete. From an architectural point of view the conditioning of the modest hospital did not have any other particular compared with the eighteen health facilities existing in that time in Madrid. However, being a work under the royal patronage, it was not of the worst equipped. The poor materials used in the construction soon start to sag and this is an excuse for its renovation.

=== Construction of the church ===
In 1587 Philip II orders a hospitalary reduction in the villa of Madrid. In 1567 demolished some walls of Carrera de San Jerónimo and were confiscated neighbor houses and that do nothing than consolidate the zone area. The small Church of the hospital is slowly taking representative functions of city center. On 1590 the foundation of the hospital building show signs of weakness. Philip II entrusts to the Police Board of Madrid to build a new church and nursing in the place of the Royal Hospital, appointing for that to architect Diego Sillero and other officers. Diego Sillero, along with his father, had dedicated to other buildings in the city, although that designs would come from the study of Juan de Herrera. Proceed to demolition of the old building.

The death of Juan de Herrera, inspirer of the work, cause a delay in the renovation. The reason for the delay were mainly economic, there was a shortage of funds did not allow the cost of a new building. The work remained stopped some years. On 1601 Philip III "the Devotional" decided to move the Court to Valladolid. Architect Francisco de Mora is the newly elected chief architect of the King. On 1606 the Court returns to Madrid, this event reactivate the construction of the church. The stonework is carried out by Agustín de Argüelles. It is not known if it was the need to attend to the cult, or the new care demands, but the construction was accelerated. The church was completed in September 1611. The altar was placed on 1612 and side chapels were finished on 1628. The first description of the church in the Puerta del Sol is that made Fernández Herrera to describe the Bernadino de Obregón's life:

... it has built a grandiose building, put in the best of Madrid at the gate called del Sol, at beginning of that they call carrera de San Jerónimo and at the end of the famous Calle Mayor (...) the church bordering the square, as well locked in the curtain that serve of lonja its entrance to the building, with a colorful and capable guardrail, gracefully dilating between the two streets of Alcalá and San Jeronimo, with a colorful and opulent façade, turning its backs the hospital building by both hazes, with great eminence in trace and form ...

— Fernández Herrera

After these other descriptions of several authors as Pedro de la Torre, Ruiz de Altable, among others. The space of the Puerta del Sol of Madrid is divided in 17th century into two: the eastern starring the lonja of the Buen Suceso (that meet the Calle de Alcalá and carrera de San Jerónimo), and the western part occupied by the Monasterio de San Felipe and the lonja (the called "mentidero"). The wide passage that joined corresponded to the space of the Puerta del Sol. On 1695 is detected that one of the canvases of the church threatens ruin. It chooses to expand at the expense of the lonja, although this entails raise a new façade and modify the dome. In the new façade survives, under a semicircular arch between lintels, the former Doric portal with royal shields. The building had to be adapted to the trapezoidal shape of the plot. The new church was terminated on 1700.

=== Dos de Mayo Uprising ===
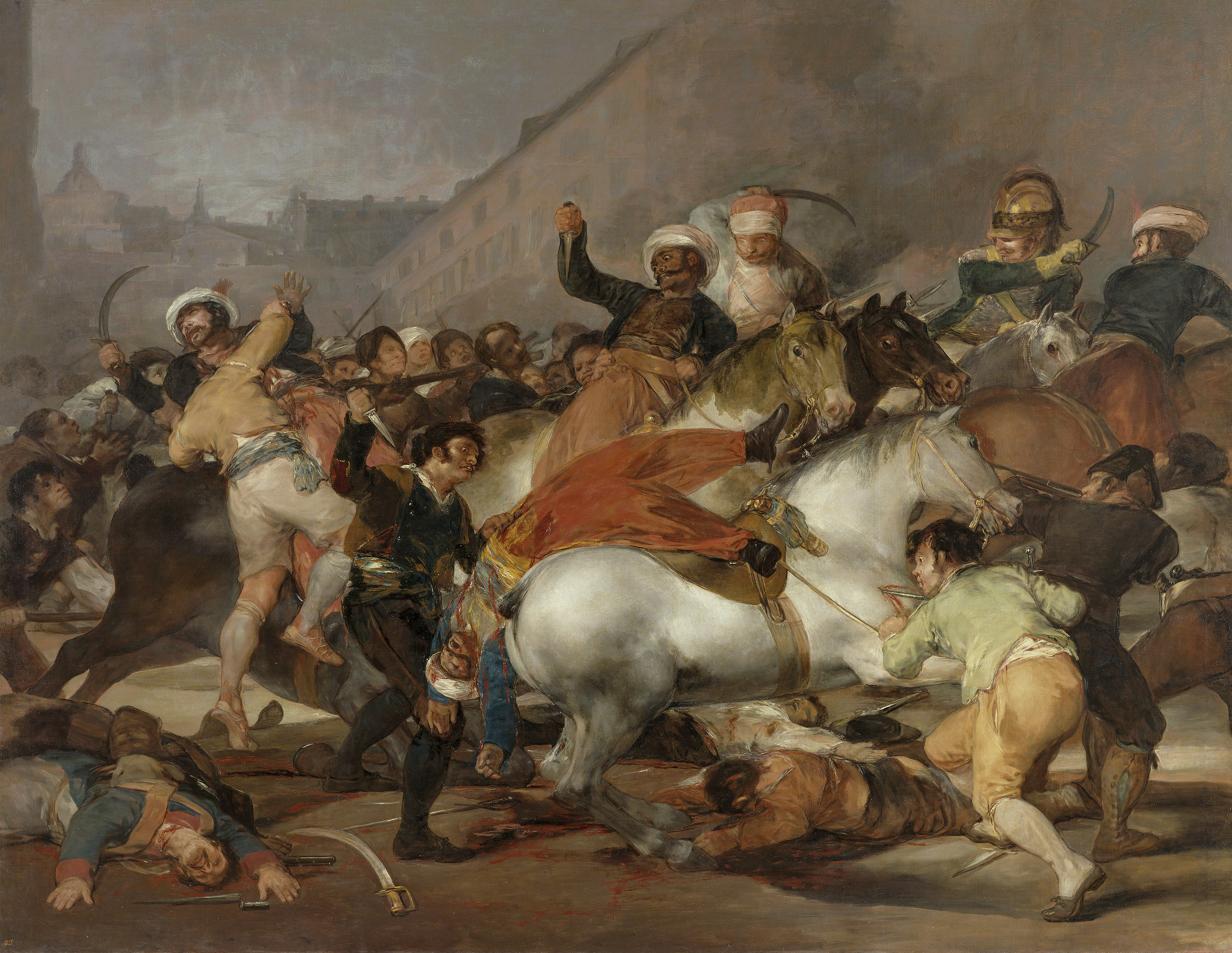
The uprising of May 2 had like protagonist the Puerta del Sol.

During the Uprising of 2 May of 1808 the church suffered serious damage to its façade and interior. The struggles that occur against the French troops in the Puerta del Sol seriously affect its structure. Struggles to become the Iglesia del Buen Suceso in a symbol of the Madrilenian resistance. But the years passed after this event and it was not until 1839 would again completely reform under the direction by Narciso Pascual Colomer that aims to design the church to accommodate to the architectural preferences of the time. Previously by Royal Order of 12 December 1832 enacted a new "Ordinances for the good order, regime and governance of the Royal Parish Church and Hospital of the Court called Nuestra Señora del Buen Suceso", which suppress the Governing Board.

=== The major reform of the Puerta del Sol (demolition) ===
Due to the reform of the Puerta del Sol, on 24 February 1854 the demolition of the church and the hospital began. Of the building remains only a columns that were brought to the Casa de Bruguera, in the Paseo de la Castellana. The Clock it wore the façade and that was reference time of the passersby in the Puerta del Sol went to the Real Casa de Correos and has since become in the Clock of the Governorate (Clock of the Puerta del Sol). The church disappears completely from the Puerta del Sol, in its place is constructed the Grand Hôtel de París, which after in mid-20th century receives the famous "Tio Pepe" neon sign.

=== Rediscovery ===
The renovation work planned its inception on 2005, were found its foundations by surprise on 2006. The surprise was that these remains appear to a meter and a half deep. It was not expected to find remains in such good condition after many works carried out by the Madrid Metro in tunneling during the 1910s. Plans to move the remains to another place of Madrid were not implemented. Instead they were buried a few meters below the foundations and can be seen in the access corridors from Cercanías de Madrid to the Metro in the Estación de Sol.

== New site ==
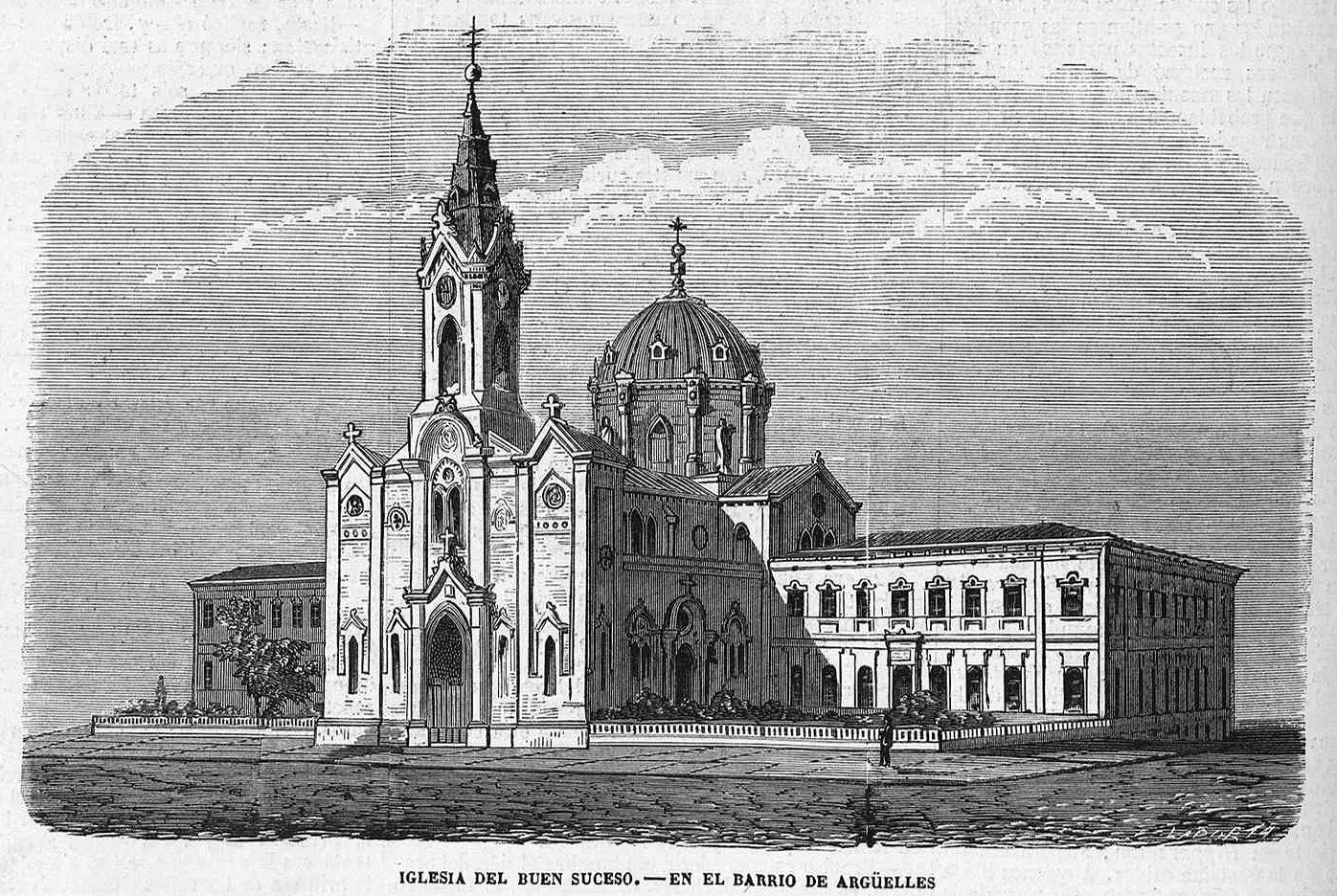
(Second) Iglesia del Buen Suceso in Argüelles neighborhood, engraving published in 1868 in El Museo Universal.

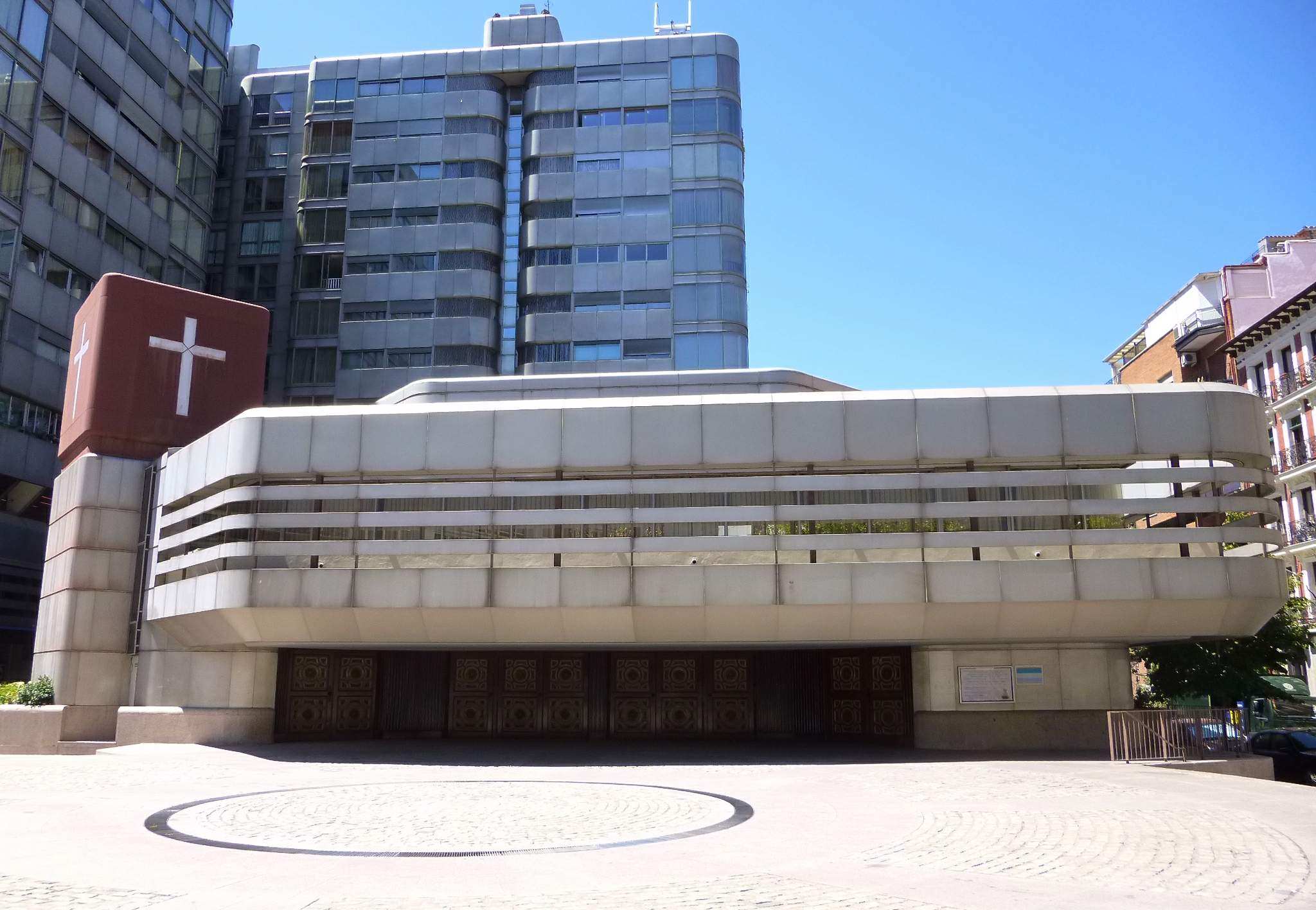
Current building in Princesa 43.

Both were transferred to the then new Argüelles neighborhood (by that time Pozas) on the current site of Princesa 43. In 1868 was inaugurated the new Iglesia del Buen Suceso in calle de Princesa, work by Agustín Ortiz de Villajos. Under Amadeo I "the Gentleman king", el Buen Suceso become to depend administratively by the General Directorate of the Royal House and Heritage, which imposed the obligation to prepare annual budgets. The Restoration establish for the Patronage new tasks, such as the public and free consultation and cure and the aid in accidents occurred on public roads, while assuming additional functions such as the special hospital for diseases of children and sick Home of Health for sick pensioners.

During the Spanish Civil War in full defense of Madrid, the church is closed and the hospital continues functioning. The area is devastated by intense artillery bombardment, and the church is completely in ruins. After the war the building was reconstructed. The Act of 7 March 1940 the Royal Patronage is integrated to the National Heritage with the rest of the former Royals Patronages. The final decline of the hospital is marked by resolution of the Board of Administration of the National Heritage of 9 June 1942, by which it removed the hospital services of el Buen Suceso, which become covered by the Directorate General of Health of the Army of Air, using the same building through a lease. This meant, in fact, the liquidation of the historic Patronage, by depriving of its essential purpose, even if, in law, it has prolonged its existence until today. The religious cult continues until now, thanks to the agreement signed by the National Heritage and the Diocese of Madrid-Alcalá, whereby is ceded the building for the operation of the new parish of the Blessed Corpus Christi in the Iglesia del Buen Suceso.

In January 1975 began the demolition of the building that then threatens ruin. The city block, between the streets Princesa, Quintana, Tutor and Buen Suceso was designed by architects Manuel del Río Martínez, Ignacio Ferrero Ruiz-de la Prada and Juan Hernández Ferrero. The action includes a new residential and commercial building with metal façade and a new church to match the building.

The new church was opened for worship on 17 April 1982. On 22 October 2006, to commemorate the fourth centenary of the discovery of the image, in a ceremony celebrated by Antonio María Rouco Varela (Cardinal Archbishop of Madrid, José Luis Huéscar Cañizal (episcopal vicar), the Nuestra Señora del Buen Suceso's pastor, Miguel Jimeno, and the Ukrainian Greco-catholic Community's chaplain, Ivan Lypko, is canonically crown the statue of Our Lady of Good Success in the parish. This current building is popularly called, ironically and contemptuously, in derogative as "Our Lady of the Magefesa" linking its shape with a toaster.

== Features ==
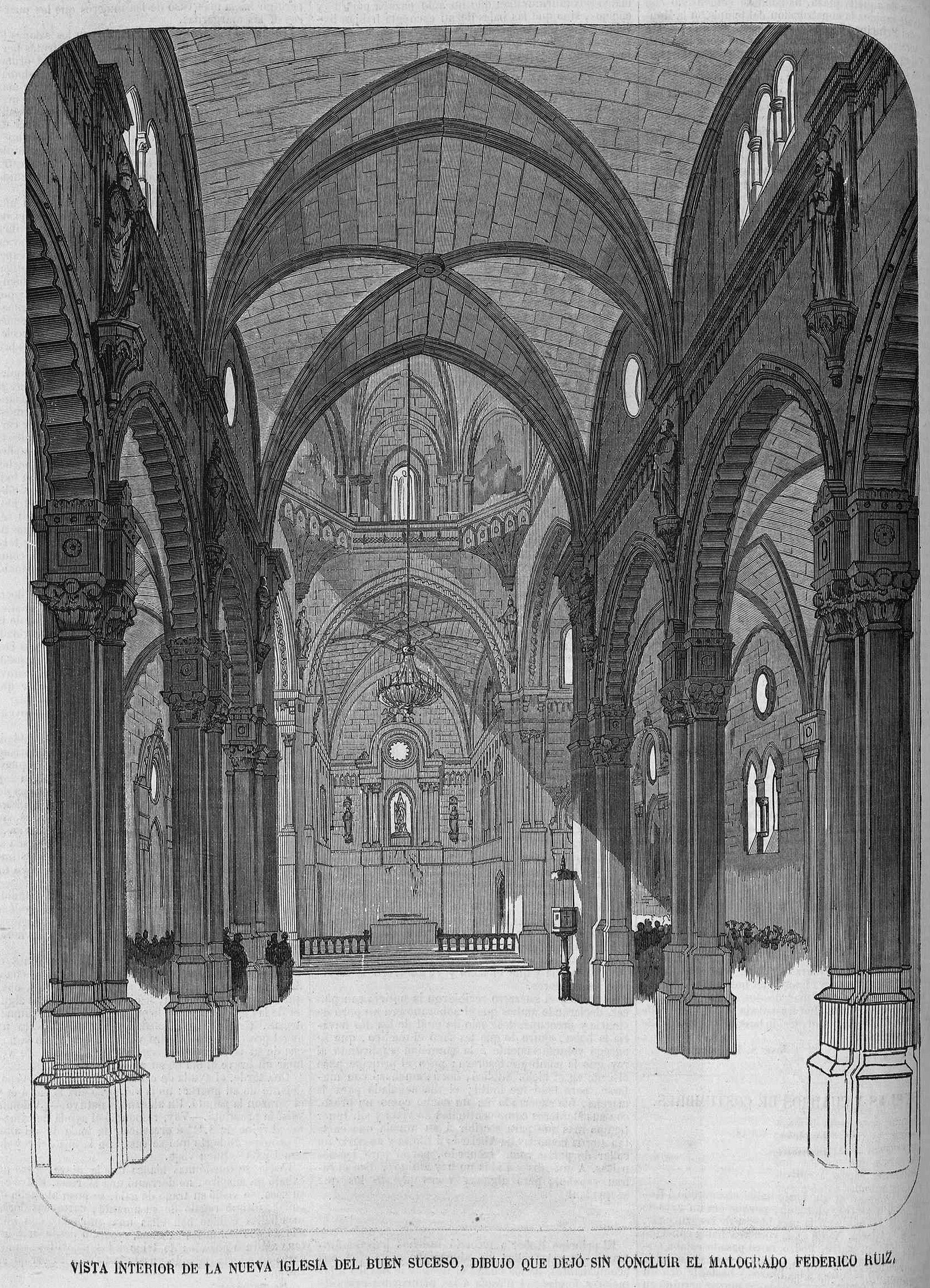
Interior view of the first Iglesia del Buen Suceso in Argüelles neighborhood, half-finished drawing by Federico Ruiz, published in El Museo Universal in February 1868.

There are few documents that describe the Iglesia del Buen Suceso, especially in regard to the floor layout. The partial descriptions of its conditioning and some engravings and representations of the time give ideas about its presence. There contemporary descriptions of Herrera Maldonado and Ruiz de Altable. The church's entrance had a lonja. The floor layout was in Greek cross with a very developed chancel and four chapels in the corners of intersection of both arms.

The style of the church, by 17th century engravings, had characteristics of the classical Mannerism. Ruiz de Altable mentions that the church building: possessed eighty feet long, sixty wide and rises in corresponding height. The altarpiece, disappeared after the demolition of 1853, it was one of the first examples of the Madrilenian Baroque.

== This church in paintings ==
- Feast day in the Puerta del Sol (1773) by Luis Paret, National Museum of Havana.
- Ornato of the Puerta del Sol at the entrance of Charles III, anonymous painting of the 17th century, Museo de Historia de Madrid.
- Twelfth Night at the Puerta del Sol (1839) by José Castelaro, Museo de Historia de Madrid.
- Madrilenian types in the Puerta del Sol (1855) by Ramón Cortés.
- Critical travel around the Puerta del Sol (1874) by Manuel Ossorio y Bernard.

== See also ==
- Catholic Church in Spain
- List of oldest church buildings
