= February 2019 Paris fire =

Arson attack in Paris, France

Coordinates: 48.8466660°N 2.2614827°E

2019 Paris apartment fire
- February 2019 Paris fire (France)
- Date: 5 February 2019
- Time: 00:01
- Location: Paris, France
- Perpetrator: Essia Boularés
- Deaths: 10
- Injuries: ≥36

On 5 February 2019, a fire killed at least 10 people and injured at least 36 others at an apartment block on Rue Erlanger in Paris' 16th arrondissement, France. It was the city's deadliest fire since the 2005 Paris fires.

The fire was quickly recognized as arson, and police arrested a former resident suspected of setting the fire. The speed with which the fire consumed several floors of a modern building and the occurrence of it less than a month after the 2019 Paris explosion highlighted vulnerabilities in some of Paris' infrastructure.

== Incident ==
An earlier police call to the building involved a domestic disturbance caused by a woman arguing with her neighbor, an ex-firefighter. The neighbor left, with police report noting they felt unsafe with her in the building. The suspect reportedly vandalized the neighbor's door and placed paper and wood against it, confronting her neighbor when he returned saying "So you're a firefighter? Here's a fire."

A structure fire was reported around 1 AM on the Rue Erlanger in the 16th arrondissement. Firefighters arrived to flames erupting from several floors of a 9-story apartment building and immediately mobilized to evacuate dozens from inside. Smoke and flames had spread up several floors by the time firefighters arrived, obstructing stairwells. More than 50 people were trapped in the building and unable to escape, requiring Paris firefighters to use ladders to rescue them. Around 250 firefighters mobilized to extinguish the inferno, which by 7 AM had been achieved. However, the fire killed at least 10 people and injured at least 36 others including 6 firefighters.

Firefighters described the area as a "scene of incredible violence." Residents fleeing smoke and injured people lying in the street were seen by witnesses. Some residents had fled to the roofs when the lower floors became impassable, requiring firefighters to do over 30 rooftop rescues from nearby buildings using ladders. The flames became widespread in the structure, and live broadcasts showed flames shooting from windows on the top floor.

== Investigation ==
Paris prosecutor Remy Heitz opened an investigation into "voluntary destruction by fire causing death". It was quickly determined that the blaze was intentionally set on the second floor at the back of the building, facing a courtyard away from the Rue Erlanger. This prevented firefighters from using the mechanical ladders from their trucks as fire was quickly spreading throughout the framing of the lower floors of the structure. The bottom two floors of the building, where the fire started, were the most damaged.

The woman who argued with her neighbors and ignited their doorframe was arrested near the building, intoxicated, under charges of arson and murder. The suspect was taken for a mental and behavioral evaluation, and it revealed she had been institutionalized for several years before being released on 23 January. Investigators revealed that the suspect been institutionalized in a psychiatric facility for five years before returning on 23 January. The suspect, Essia Boularés was convicted and sentenced to 25 years in prison.

== Response ==
The fire occurred around a month after an explosion at a Paris bakery killed four people. In this context, the fire highlighted vulnerabilities of Paris' infrastructure to fire. Paris Mayor Anne Hidalgo responded to the loss of life and injuries caused by the blaze by saying the city was in "mourning," while French President Emmanuel Macron stated that France "had woken up to tragedy." Interior Minister Christophe Castaner and the president praised the over 250 firefighters for their efforts to extinguish the blaze.

The fire was noted for the speed and violence at which it traveled through a modern building, with Le Monde comparing it to fires of poorer and older buildings.

== See also ==
- 2019 Paris explosion
- 2017 Bronx apartment fire
