= Paris explosion =

Paris explosion may refer to:

- 2019 Paris explosion, occurred at 6 Rue de Trevise in 9th arrondissement of Paris
- 2023 Paris explosion, occurred at the Paris American Academy at 277, rue Saint-Jacques
