= Grand Hôtel de París =

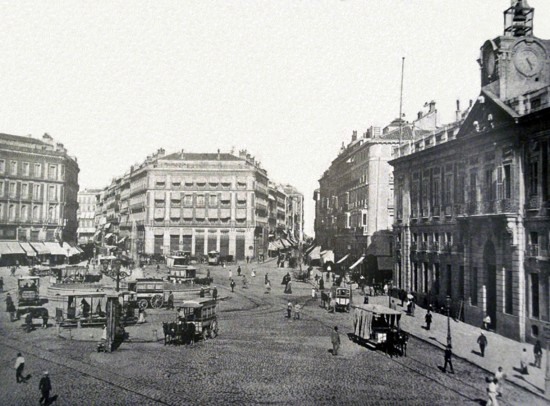

- Location within Madrid

General information
- Type: Hotel
- Location: Madrid, Spain
- Coordinates: 40°25′0.65″N 3°42′8.15″W
- Opened: 1864
- Demolished: 2006

Grand Hôtel de París was a hotel located in the eastern part of the Puerta del Sol, central Madrid, Spain. After the first reforms occurred in 1860, a building was built which was originally called the "Fonde de Paris". The Hotel Paris was one of the first hotels in Madrid with a bathroom in each room and room service. In the 19th century it was known for its high prices and famous clientele. The hotel closed in 2006.

== History ==
Opened in the summer of 1864. It was built with French investment, and this is noted in the decoration and style of its interiors. Its spacious dining room was famous for serving French cuisine. On the first floor was the popular Café Imperial, with seating for five hundred people. The hotels was built to meet the anticipated demand for new travelers from the opening of the railway line between Madrid and Paris. In 1865, the proprietors and managers were Messrs. Fallola. In 1874, it was considered to be the leading hotel of Madrid, as well as the one only place in Spain where a traveller could find excellent accommodation.

In 1895, the Hotel Paris was sold to the company Baena, who renovated the hotel, transforming the rooms, and adding an elevator and electric lighting. It functioned for decades as one of the elite hotels in Madrid. After the Civil War, the hotel suffered from competition, but survived, thanks to the advantage it offered to provide rooms overlooking the Puerta del Sol. However, it finally closed in May 2006. The building was abandoned and began its restoration in early 2011, and reopened as an Apple Store after the renovation.

== Notable residents ==
- Édouard Manet
- Maurice Ravel
- Rubén Darío
