= IES San Isidro =

Coordinates: 40°24′45.81″N 3°42′26.1936″W

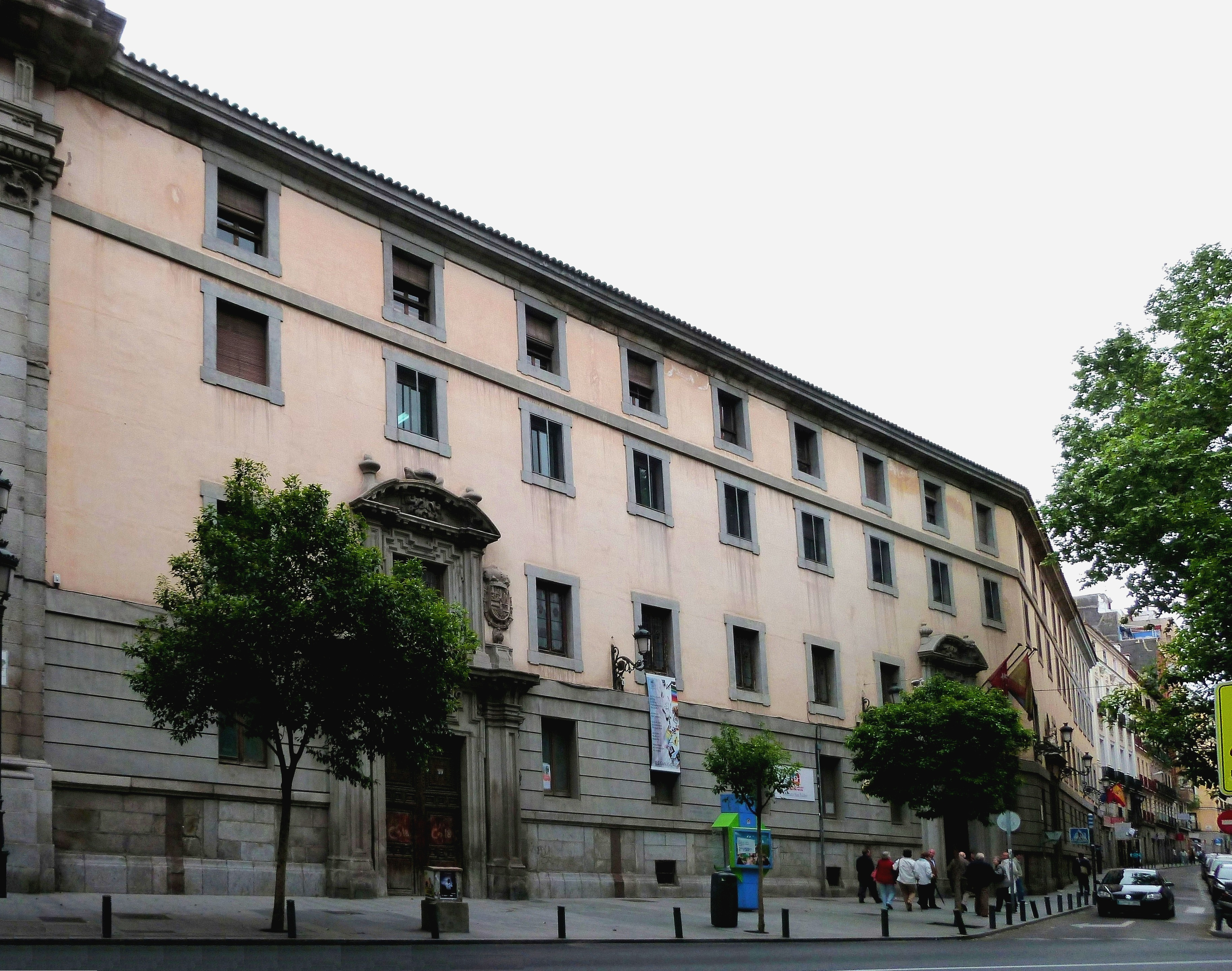

Location
- Calle de Toledo, 39, Madrid, Spain; 28005

Information
- Type: Public secondary school
- Established: 1845; 181 years ago
- Head Master: Enrique de Avilés y Arroyo
- Director of Studies: Rafael de Martín y Villa
- Gender: Coeducational
- Age: 12 to 18
- Alumni: Old Franciscans

The Instituto de Enseñanza Secundaria San Isidro (IES San Isidro), formerly known as the Imperial College of Madrid (Colegio Imperial de Madrid) is a co-educational day school for pupils from 12 to 18 years of age. It is located in the historical Calle de Toledo in Madrid, Spain.

It is one of 66 secondary schools established in provincial capitals and other major cities under the 1836 Plan General de Instrucción Pública. Most of these schools occupied the premises of disentailed convents and other church buildings. Originally a boys' school, it became coeducational and state-owned in the second half of the 20th century. The school occupies part of a site belonging to several earlier schools, indirectly tracing its origins to 1346, and is considered the oldest non-university education center in Spain.

San Isidro has educated eight Spanish prime ministers and was formerly referred to as the "nanny" of Spain's statesmen. With the discovery of the Americas, the school gained importance in educating young men who would later serve the Spanish Empire. It has four Nobel Prize laureates among its alumni: José Echegaray, Jacinto Benavente, Vicente Aleixandre, and Camilo José Cela.

== Heritage ==
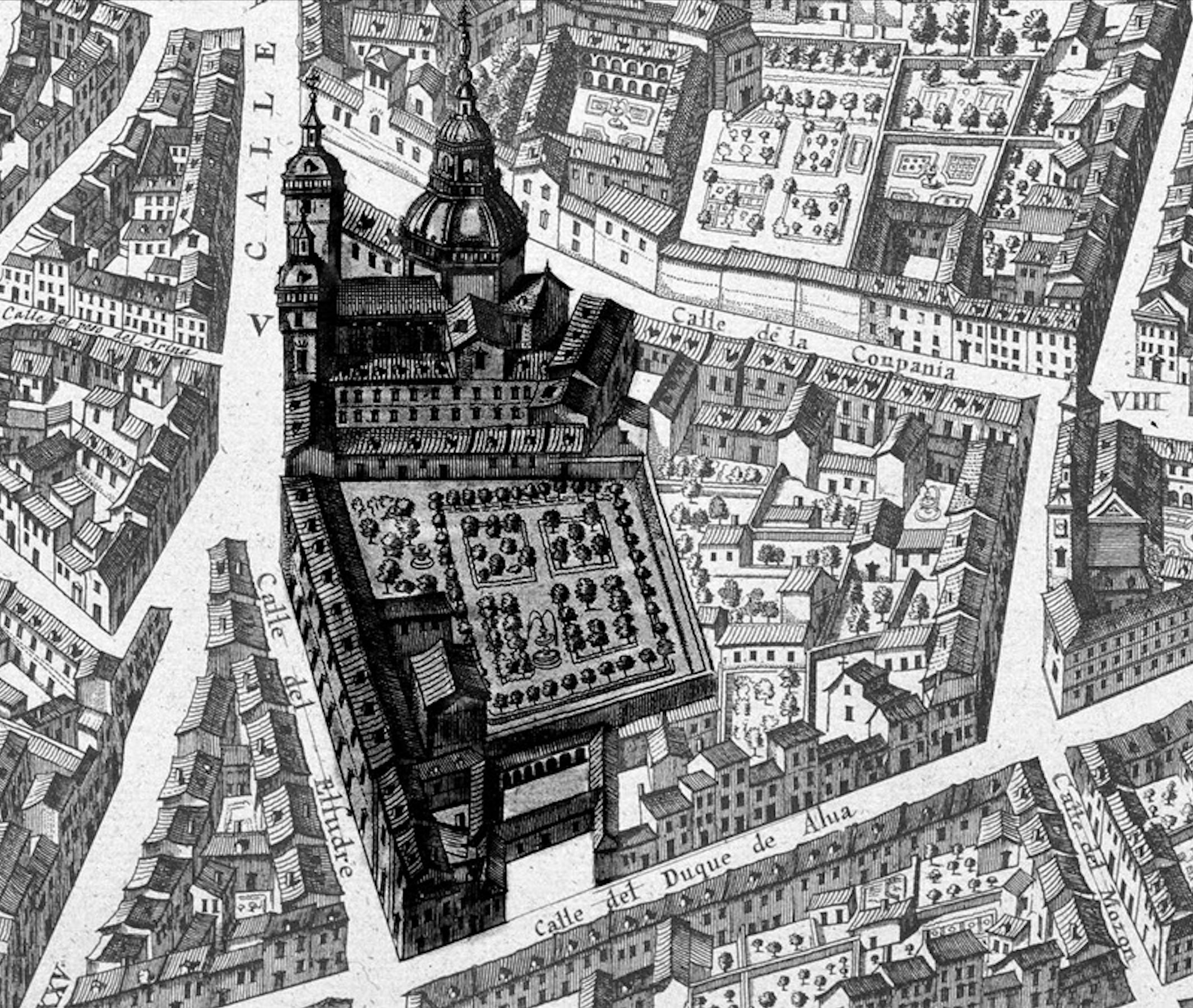
Detail of Pedro Texeira's 17th century map of Madrid showing the location of the Imperial College

The school occupies part of the site originally belonging to several former education centers, including the Reales Estudios de San Isidro (1625–1809), formally known as the Colegio Imperial (c. 1590–1625). It was built on land donated by Empress Maria of Austria.

The current building includes the baroque cloister (1672), a baroque staircase and an elegant chapel (1723). On the stairs is a small museum dedicated to science and education.

From 1847 to 1936, Madrid's School of Architecture (Escuela Especial de Arquitectura, now Superior Technical School of Architecture of Madrid, ETSAM) occupied part of the premises of the Institute, together with the secondary school and other schools and departments. In 1936, it moved to its current site at Ciudad Universitaria. The School of Architecture's coat of arms remain over the main entrance to the Institute.

The school has a museum on the ground floor with a recreation of a school class and four floors of various interests.

== Notable alumni ==
The school has educated a wide range of notable figures including four Nobel Prize laureates and eight Spanish prime ministers. Many old pupils went on to fight in the Spanish Civil War, the great majority of them joining the Nationalist side.

== See also ==
- List of the oldest schools in the world
- Colegiata de San Isidro
- Colegio Imperial de Madrid
- List of Jesuit sites

== Bibliography ==
- Ortega Vidal, Javier; Marín Perellón, Francisco José. "La conformación del Colegio Imperial de Madrid (1560-1767)." Anales del Instituto de Estudios Madrileños, LIII, pp. 135–175. Madrid, 2013
- Fernández-Burgueño, Vicente, El Instituto San Isidro: Saber y Patrimonio, Apuntes para una Historia (Madrid, Editorial CSIC, 2013, ISBN 978-84-00-09776-9)
- Díaz, José Simón, Historia del Colegio Imperial de Madrid: Volúmenes I y II (Madrid, Instituto de Estudios Madrileños, 1959, ISBN 978-84-00-07148-6)
