= 2021 Madrid explosion =

- Date: 20 January 2021
- Time: 14:55 CET
- Location: Calle de Toledo, Madrid, Spain; 40°24′29.5″N 3°42′40.0″W
- Cause: Gas leak
- Deaths: 4
- Injuries: 10

On 20 January 2021, an explosion occurred in a building on Calle de Toledo in Madrid, Spain, causing it to partially collapse. The blast killed four people and wounded ten others.

== Explosion ==
At about 14:55 CET, at a residence which provided training for Catholic priests and gave meals to homeless people, on Calle de Toledo, in Madrid, Spain, neighbors felt a weird smell. When they were trying to find out where it came from, the building exploded because of a gas leak originated in the street. This massive explosion partially destroyed the building but didn't leave anybody under the debris. Four men were killed in the blast: a 35-year-old electrician, who was also a parishioner and had gone there to visit his friend, the priest; a 45-year-old bricklayer who was working nearby the scene; a 46-year-old Bulgarian passerby; and a 36-year-old parish priest who died in hospital the day after the explosion. Ten other people were wounded, including one in critical condition. The building was seriously damaged in the incident, with the top four floors being totally destroyed. A nearby school and a nursing home were also affected by the blast but nobody was hurt in those two locations; the nursing home was evacuated.

== See also ==
- 2019 Paris explosion
- List of explosions
- 2013 Rosario gas explosion
- Chemical Industries of Ethylene Oxide explosion
