= Calle de Toledo =

Street in Madrid, Spain

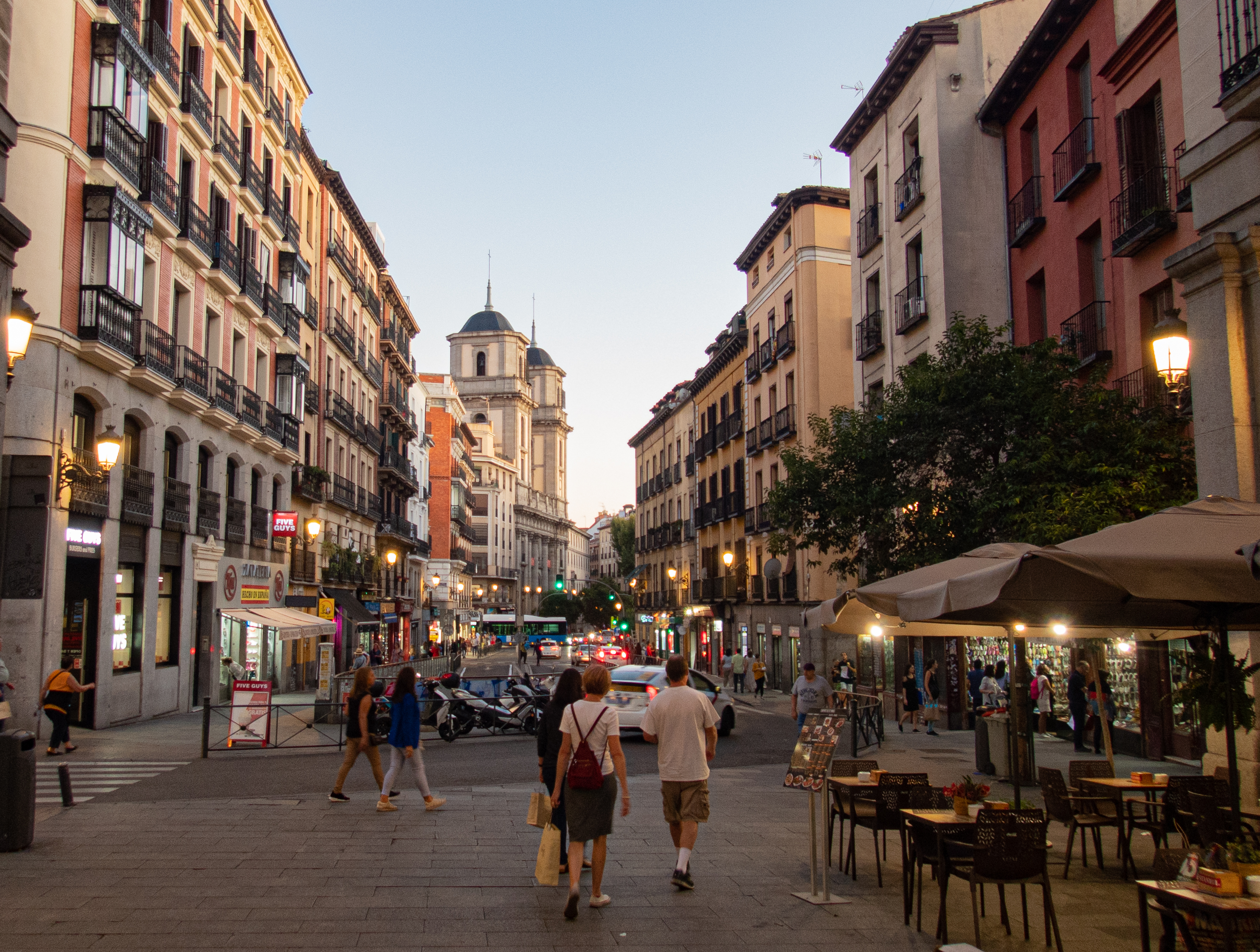
- Type: street
- Location: Madrid, Spain
- North end: Plaza Mayor
- South end: Glorieta de las Pirámides

The Calle de Toledo is a historic street in central Madrid, Spain, running across the Centro and Arganzuela districts.

== History and description ==
Straddling along the Centro and Arganzuela districts, it starts at the Plaza Mayor and ends at the Glorieta de las Pirámides. It was already named Toledo in the 16th century. Until the late 15th century it ended at the Hospital of La Latina. In the early 17th century the part near the Plaza Mayor was widened. Following the 1790 fire in the Plaza Mayor, the buildings of the Portal de Cofreros were rebuilt with new materials following the anti-fire regulations dictated by Juan de Villanueva. The street consolidated as one of the specialised commercial streets in the city centre by the early 20th century. The image of the northernmost end near the Plaza Mayor became a part of the Antifascist collective memory with the photograph of the ¡No pasarán! banner (Note: ¡No pasarán! El fascismo quiere conquistar Madrid / Madrid será la tumba del fascismo. "They shall not pass! Fascism wants to conquer Madrid. Madrid shall be the tomb of Fascism".) hanged in the street during the Spanish Civil War.

The landmarks located in the street include La Fuentecilla (at the junction with the calle de Arganzuela) and the Instituto San Isidro.

On 20 January 2021, four people were killed in a building explosion.

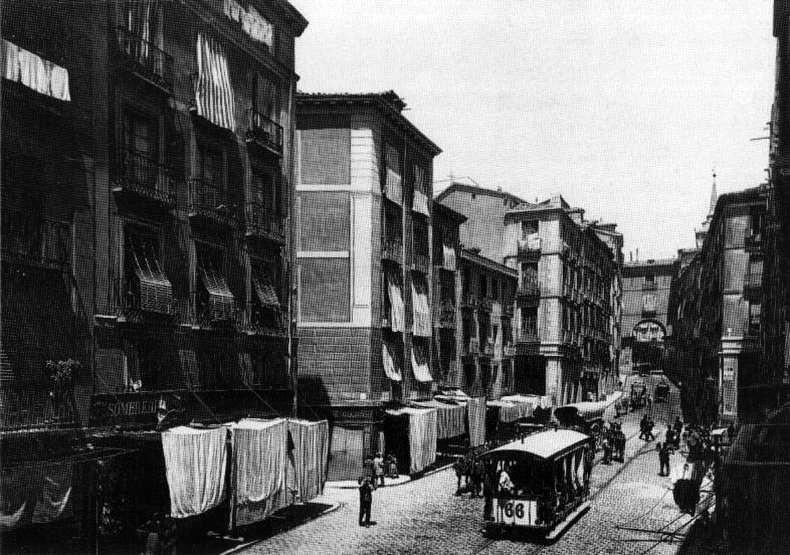
The street circa 1890

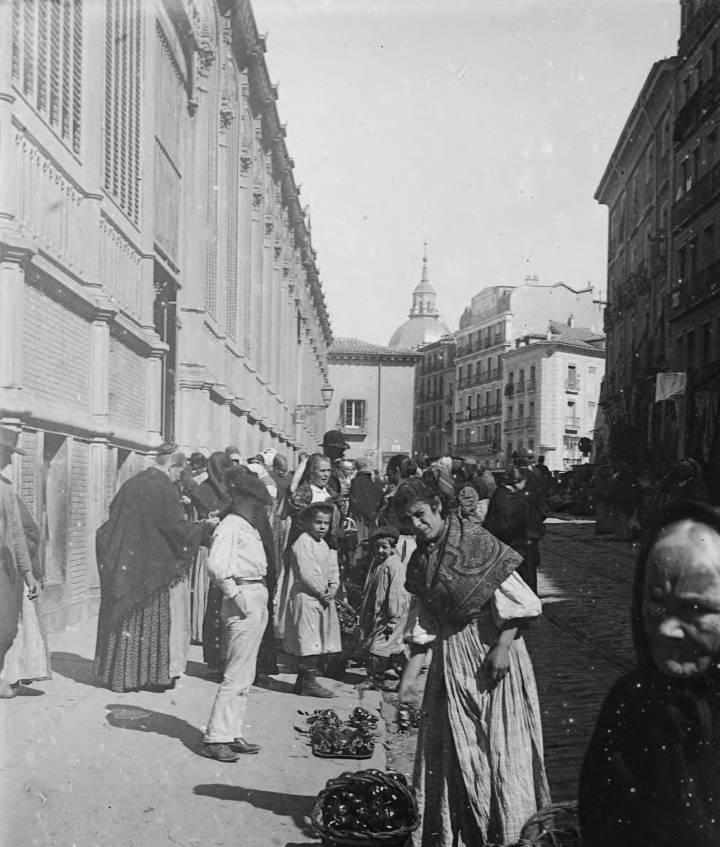
Female street vendors in the street next to the market of La Cebada (c. 1900)
