= Fountain de La Mariblanca =

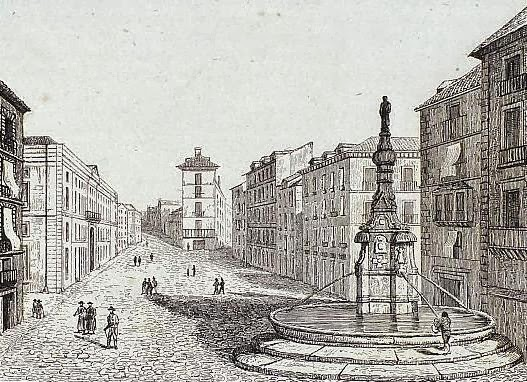
Fountain de La Mariblanca in 1841.

The Fountain de La Mariblanca was a fountain located in Puerta del Sol, in Madrid. Now demolished. Not to be confused with other fountains located in Madrid and Spain with the same name.

This fountain replaced an older Puerta del Sol fountain, the Fountain of the Harpies.

== History and decor ==
In 1727 Pedro de Ribera was commissioned to replace the Fountain of the Harpies, located in the Puerta del Sol, which had been projected a century earlier by Italian sculptor Rutilio Gaci.

While the Madrilenian architect took some elements of the early fountain, completely redid the work of his predecessor, due to its deterioration. He opted for a slimmer and lower composition, on the line which, years later, would propose to the Fuente de la Fama, though much more restrained than this.

Regarding the decor, is quite true that eliminated much of the ornaments designed by Gaci like the harpies, which were replaced by dolphins, but it is also true that kept many others, such as the masks with dispenser or the sculpture topping the set.

This was none other than the Mariblanca, the famous white marble statue, possibly a representation of Venus, which was imported from Italy in 1619 and now is in the Casa de la Villa, after suffering all kinds of avatars and numerous moved.

The fountain designed by Ribera was demolished in 1838, decades before of proceed with the great reform of the Puerta del Sol, which led to its current path. The Mariblanca statue is the only remnant that has survived.
