= Mariblanca =

Coordinates: 40°25′01″N 3°42′16″W

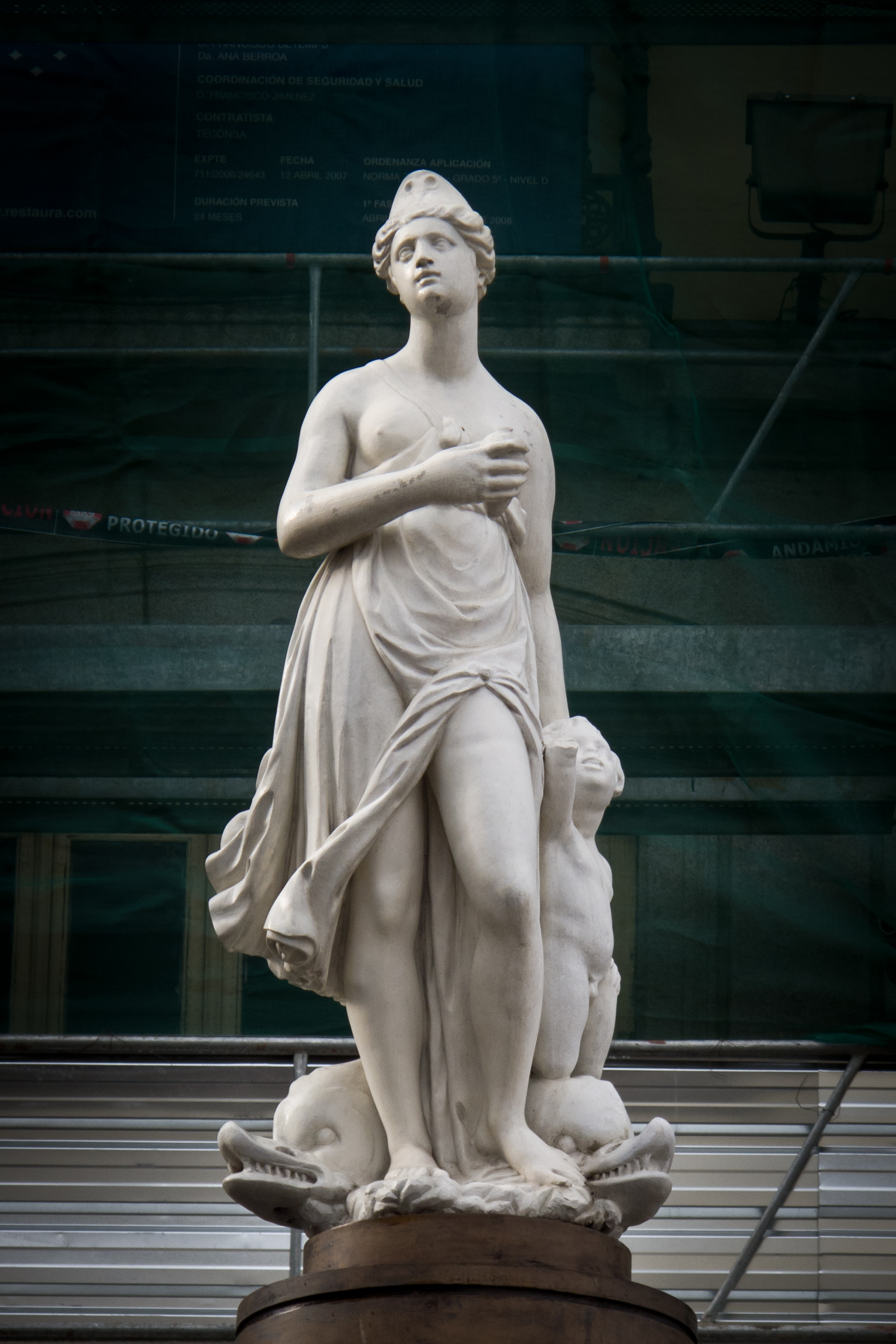
Statue of Mariblanca, in its current location in Casa de la Villa, in Madrid.

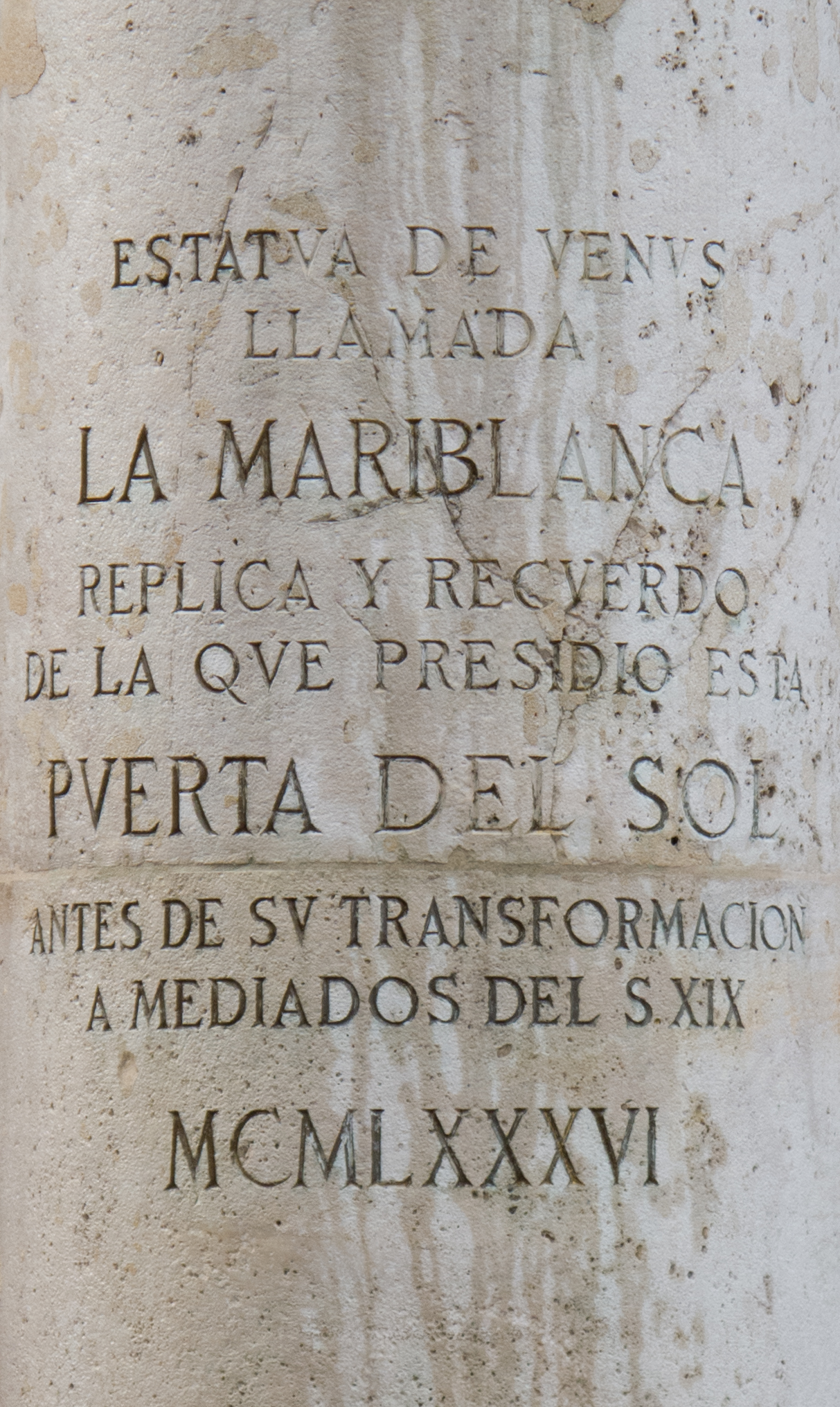
Inscription on the pedestal roughly translates as: " Venus statue called the Mariblanca. Replica and recollection of that which was situated in the Puerta del Sol before its refurbishment in the mid-19th Century - (dated: 1986)"

The statues known as Mariblanca are female figures of uncertain origin which may relate to the fertility goddesses Venus or Fortuna.

The name, which is common in Spanish relates to a statue which was purchased in the year 1625 by a Florentine merchant Ludovico Turchi as a gift to crown the lost Fountain of Faith in Madrid.

It is now the only element that remains of this monumental fountain, which was located on the church of Good Faith, which formerly stood in the Puerta del Sol.

There are now a number of copies and similar statues also known as Mariblanca. The origin of which is uncertain, but may relate to a religious anxiety related to idolatry or pagan representations of purity, fertility and grace other than those associated with the Virgin Mary.

Mariblanca also serves as a female Christian name.

== See also ==
- Fountain de La Mariblanca
- Fountain of the Harpies
