= Puerta del Sol =

Square in Madrid, Spain

Coordinates: 40°25′01″N 3°42′13″W

- View of the square in September 2026
- Type: urban square
- Location: Sol, Centro, Madrid, Spain
- Major junctions: Mayor, Arenal, Preciados, Carmen, Montera, Alcalá, San Jerónimo, Espoz y Mina, Carretas, Correo

The Puerta del Sol (Spanish: [ˈpweɾta ðel ˈsol], English: "Gate of the Sun") is a public square in Madrid, one of the best known and busiest places in the city. This is the centre (Km 0) of the radial network of Spanish roads. The square also contains the famous clock whose bells mark the traditional eating of the Twelve Grapes and the beginning of a new year. The New Year's celebration has been broadcast live since 31 December 1962 on major radio and television networks including Atresmedia and RTVE.

== History ==
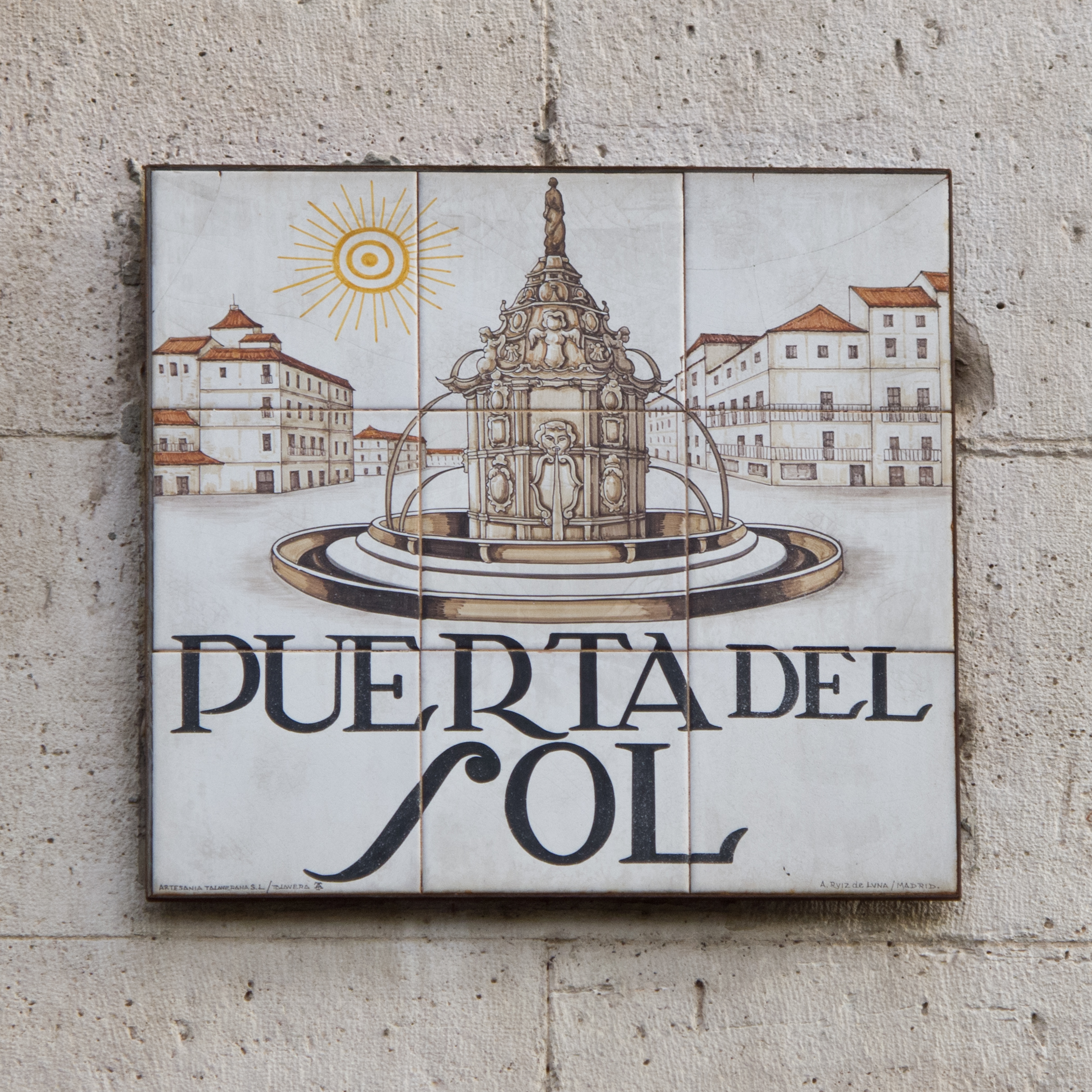
Tiled street-sign of Puerta del Sol with a historic depiction of the square

The Puerta del Sol originated as one of the gates in the city wall that surrounded Madrid in the 15th century. Outside the wall, medieval suburbs began to grow around the Christian Wall of the 12th century. The name of the gate came from the rising sun which decorated the entry, since the gate was oriented to the east.

Between the 17th and 19th centuries, the area was an important meeting place: as the goal for the couriers coming from abroad and other parts of Spain to the Post Office, it was visited by those eager for the latest news. The stairs to the Saint Philip church at the square were known as the Gradas de San Felipe, and were among the most prolific mentideros de la Corte (this Spanish idiom sounds as "lie-spreaders of the Court", but it is related with the verb mentar, "to say about someone", not mentir, "to lie", so it is more appropriately translated as "places of the City where people gossip").

The House of the Post Office was built by French architect Jacques Marquet between 1766 and 1768. The building was the headquarters of the Ministry of Interior and State Security in Francoist Spain. It is currently the seat of the Presidency of the Madrid Community.

The Puerta del Sol has seen protests against the 2004 Madrid bombings on commuter trains, and Spain's involvement in the Iraq War. In 2011, the square became established as a focal point and a symbol for the ongoing anti-austerity movement in Spain. The demonstrations included camping in the middle of the plaza, which began on 15 May 2011 amidst the election campaign for city halls and Autonomous Communities governments and which was fueled by social media, particularly Twitter and Facebook. The demonstrations then spread to more than sixty other cities throughout Spain. Since 12 June 2011, the square has held a free-standing domed structure made from pallets, which served as an information point for the 15-M Movement. This continued throughout the summer of 2011 until the dawn of 2 August, when the national police decided to evict the structure and protestors. Currently, dozens of committees have their assemblies in the square.

Despite once being the meeting point of the six major radial roads of Spain, in 2020 the square was pedestrianized and closed to most traffic. Exceptions are made for supplies to shops, emergency services and blood donation campaigns.

=== Other events ===
During New Year's Eve 2018–2019, the clock of the Puerta del Sol for the first time in history rang the bells according to the schedule of the Canary Islands. After the traditional twelve strokes of midnight, the clock delayed itself one hour to adjust to Canary Islands time, and also gave the chimes at the same time as the archipelago.

== Famous buildings and landmarks ==
The Puerta del Sol contains a number of well known sights both domestically and internationally associated with Spain. On the south side, the old Post Office was the headquarters of the Ministry of Interior and State Security in Francoist Spain. The basement of the DGS (Spanish: Dirección General de Seguridad, lit. 'General Directorate of Security') was infamous for being a place where dissidents to the regime were subjected to torture. The building now serves as the office of the President of Madrid, the head of the regional government of the Autonomous Community of Madrid (not to be confused with the Madrid City Council, which is housed in the Palacio de Cibeles). There are two commemorative plaques in the front of the Royal House of the Post Office: one is devoted to the neighbours of Madrid who rose up against the Napoleonic invasion of Spain on 2 May 1808; the other one is a memorial of the victims of the 2004 Madrid bombings. In 2020, another plaque was added, commemorating those who died during the COVID-19 pandemic.

Also on its south side, the square holds a mounted statue of Charles III of Spain, nicknamed "el rey alcalde" ("the mayor-king") due to the extensive public works program he set in motion. The famous Tío Pepe lighted sign was above the square's eastern building between the Calle de Alcalá and the Carrera de San Jerónimo (Apple Store today) for a long time, now is on top of the former Paris Hotel. Also on the east side lies the statue of The Bear and the Strawberry Tree (in Spanish, el Oso y el Madroño), the heraldic symbol of Madrid. Until 2009, the statue stood on the north side at the entrance to Calle del Carmen. The Mariblanca (a female figure named for its white marble) is a copy of a statue (possibly of Venus, and so the restored pedestal claims), which marks the place of a former fountain displaying that figure.

The kilómetro cero is a plaque on the ground directly north of the Post Office serving as the symbolic center of Spain, and the point from which kilometer distances are numbered in the Spanish road system.

== Location in Madrid ==
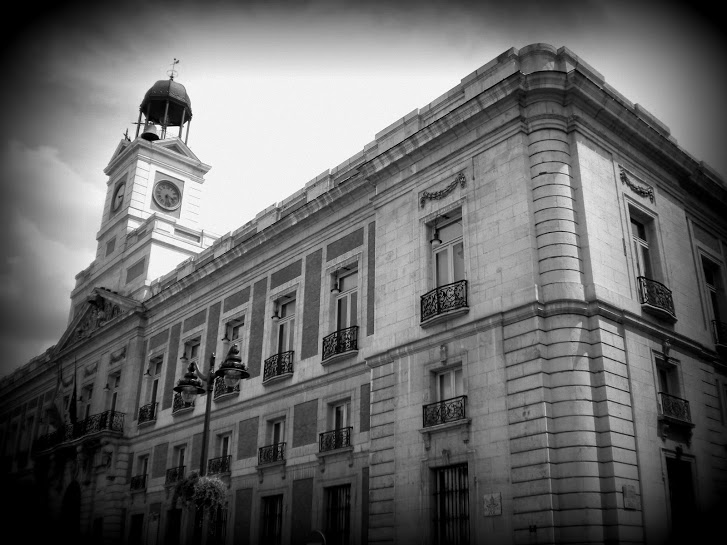
Real Casa de Correos at Puerta del Sol, Madrid.

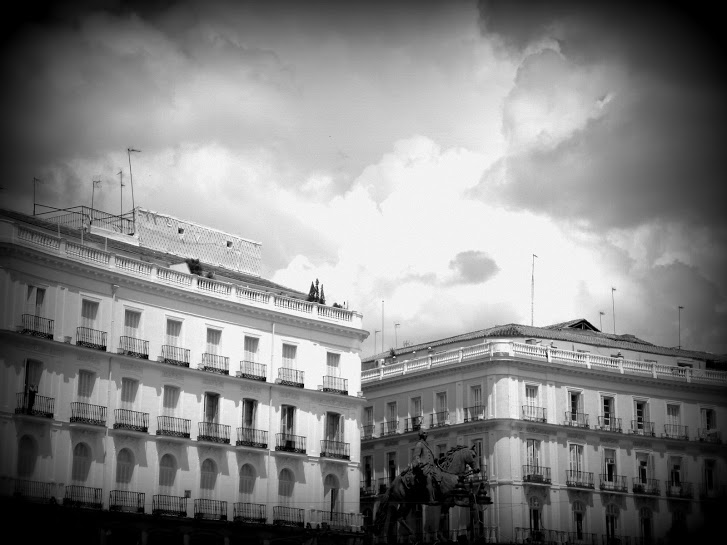
Puerta del Sol, Madrid.

The Puerta is located in the very heart of Madrid. It serves as the kilometre zero from which all radial roads in Spain are measured. This is demonstrated by a plaque on the floor of the square, marking the exact point of Km.0. This was established in 1857, setting six major radial roads, clockwise:

- N-1 (Northern Road) to Irun, border town with France, via Burgos, starting from Calle Montera and continuing through Calle de Fuencarral and Calle de Bravo Murillo
- N-2 (Northeastern Road) to La Jonquera, border town with France, via Zaragoza and Barcelona, starting from Calle de Alcalá
- N-3 (Eastern Road) to Valencia, starting from Carrera de San Jerónimo, where the Congress of Deputies is located, and continuing through Paseo del Prado
- N-4 (Southern Road) to Córdoba, Seville and Cádiz, starting from Calle Carretas, Calle Concepción Jerónima and Calle de Toledo
- N-5 (Southwestern Road) to Badajoz, border town with Portugal, starting from Calle Mayor
- N-6 (Northwestern Road) to A Coruña, starting from Calle Preciados, continuing through Gran Vía and Calle de la Princesa

The old plaque was replaced in 2009, as it had become faded after years of foot traffic. It is also the reference for street numbers in Madrid, which begin at the street-end that is closest to Puerta del Sol.

The old and new kilometer zero plaques

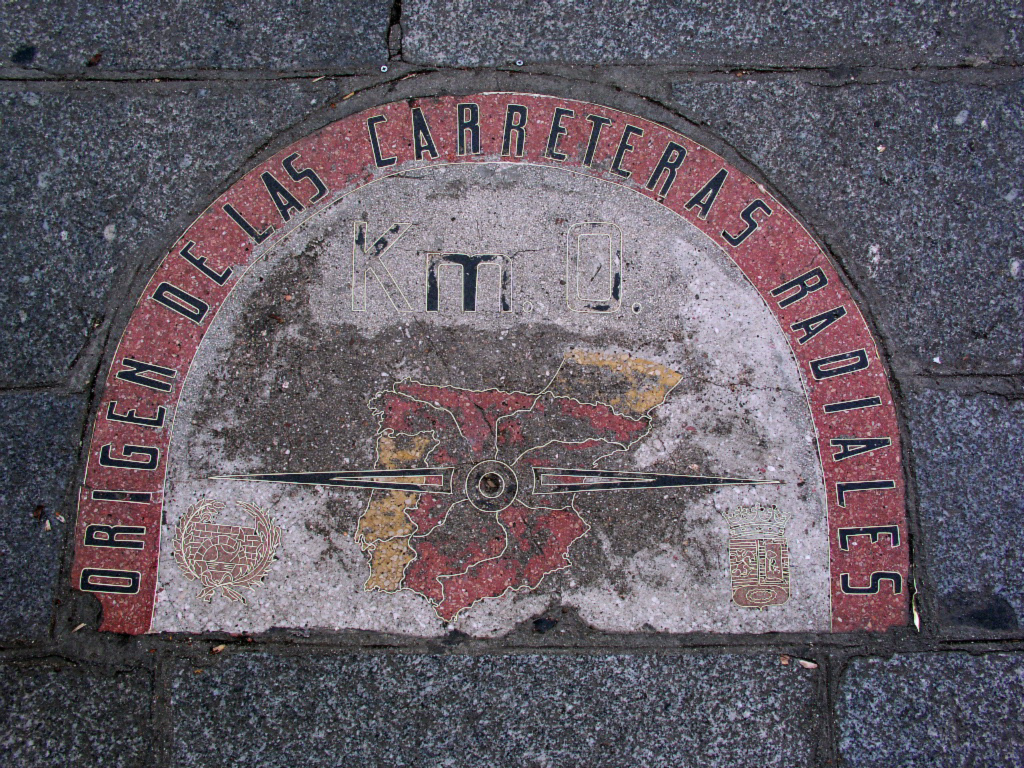

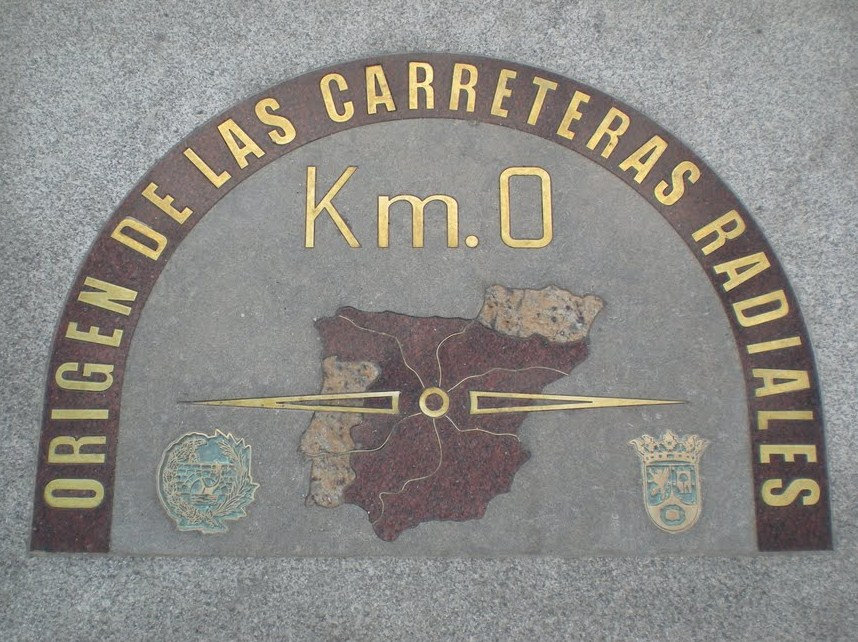

Immediately to the southwest lies the Plaza Mayor; the Palacio Real, the official home of the Royal Family, is further west. Parliament and the museum district are to the east and the train station Atocha is to the southeast.

Under the square lies a public transport hub served by lines 1, 2 and 3 of the Madrid Metro. A commuter service was inaugurated on 27 June 2009, four years behind schedule. The lateness of the construction was in part due to the discovery of the remains of the Church of Our Lady of Good Success during the excavation of the main chamber. The new station connects the Puerta to Madrid's commuter rail system and, by extension, to Spain's railroads via direct connections to Atocha and Chamartín railway stations .

The square connects several commercial and recreational areas together, and thus both it and the surrounding streets consist mainly of shopping establishments catering to locals and tourists alike, like the several El Corte Inglés department store buildings in Preciados Street, La Mallorquina cafe, and numerous, ever-changing restaurants. The area remains active late into the night and early morning since nearby bars and dance clubs often only start entertainment at 1 am. Street music is also common in the area.

Side streets close to the square also contain residential flats, some small offices, and tourist hostels.

== Gallery ==
Puerta del Sol in 1862

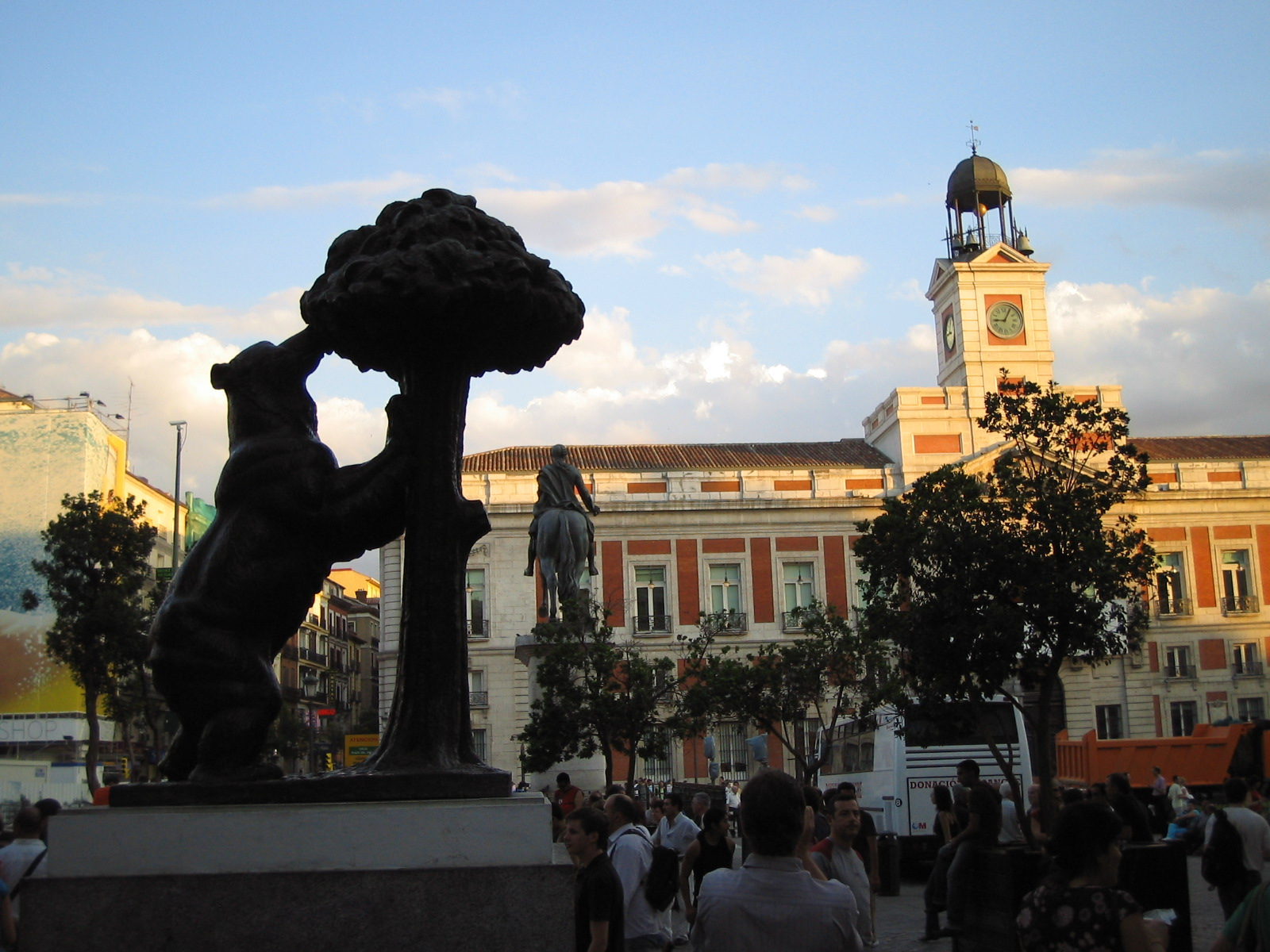
Bear and the Madroño Tree, heraldic symbol of Madrid

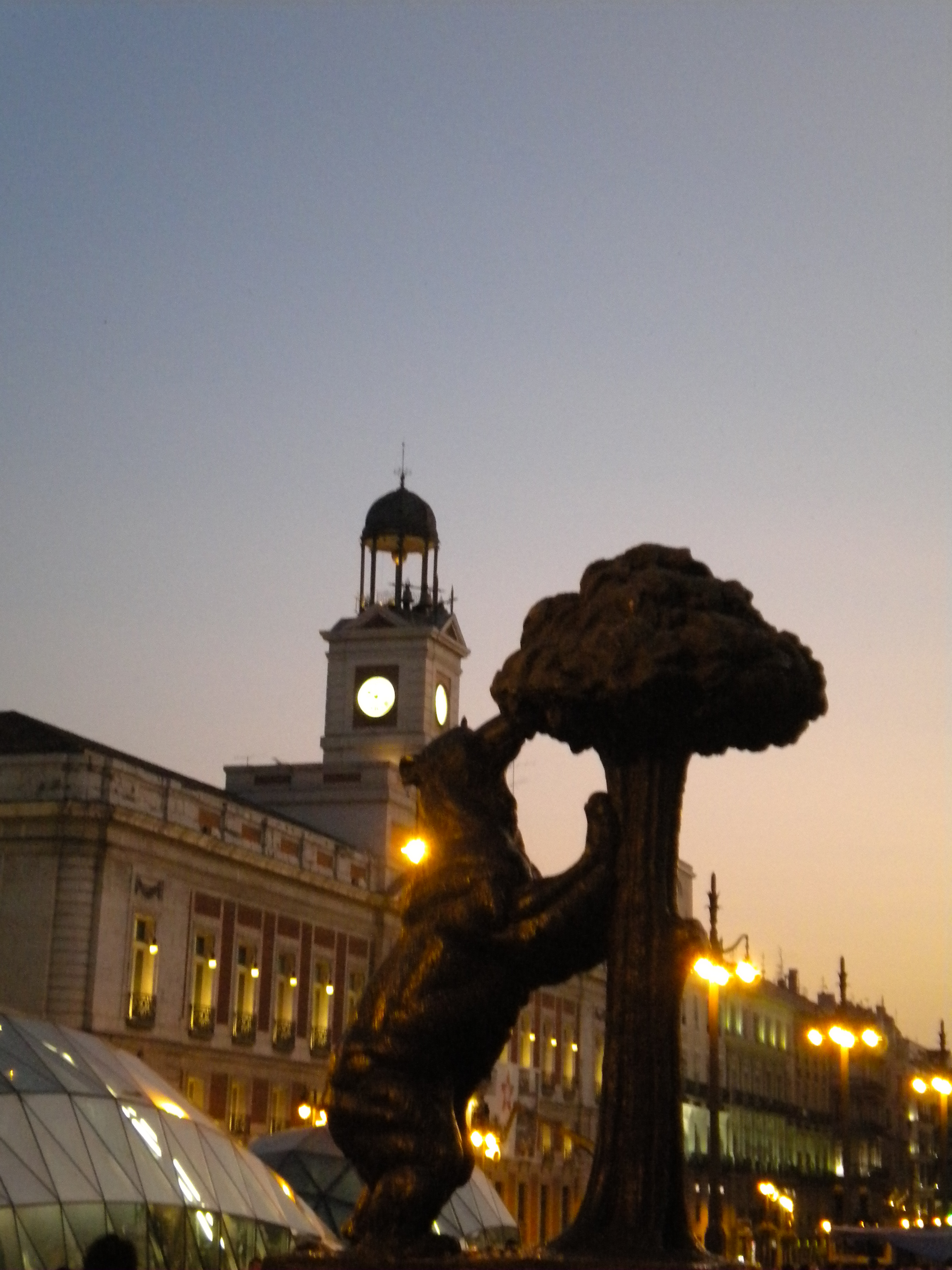
Night time photo of the Bear and the Madroño Tree, heraldic symbol of Madrid

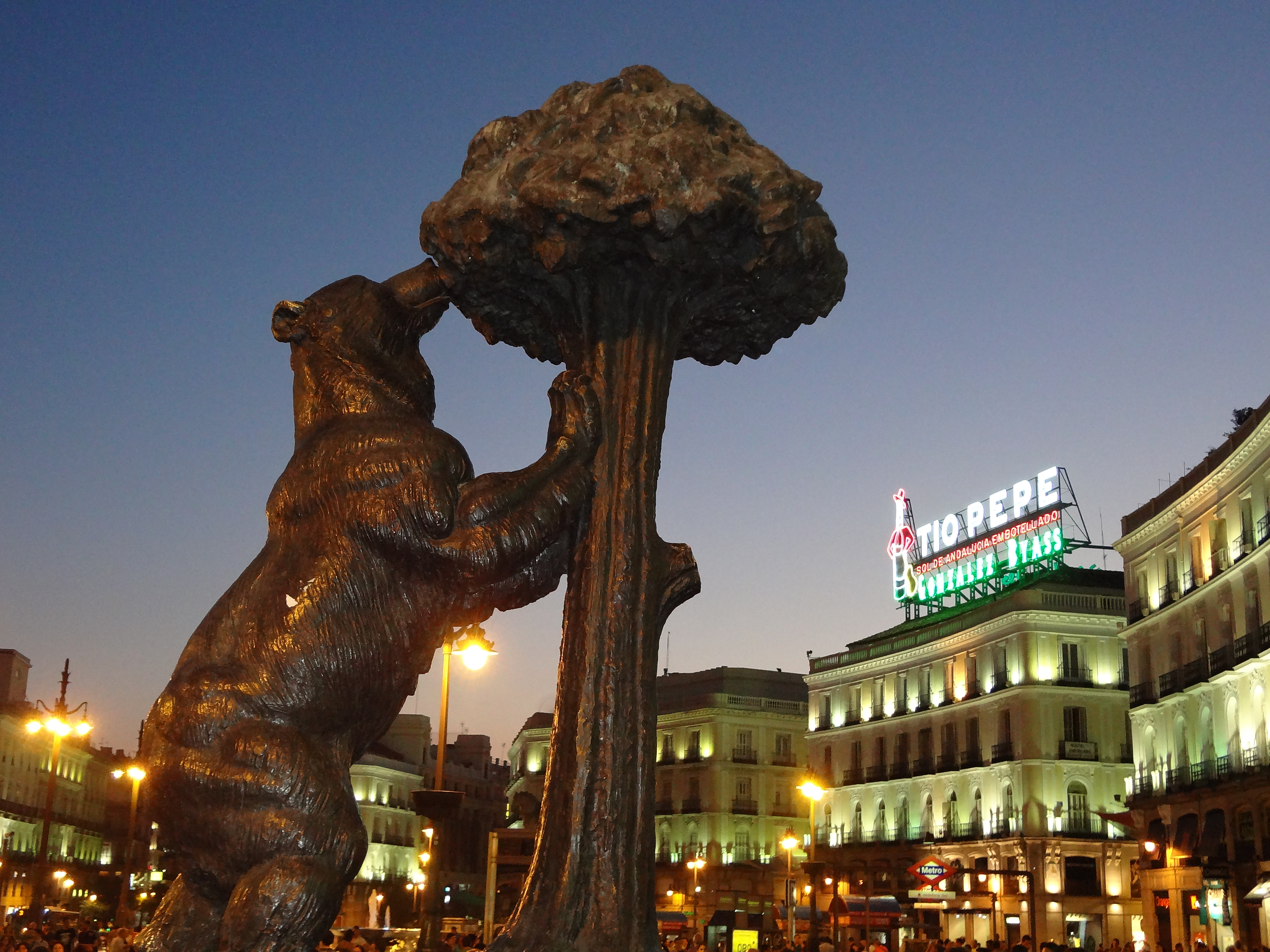
A sunset, the Bear and the Madroño Tree and the Tio Pepe Neon Advertisement in the distance

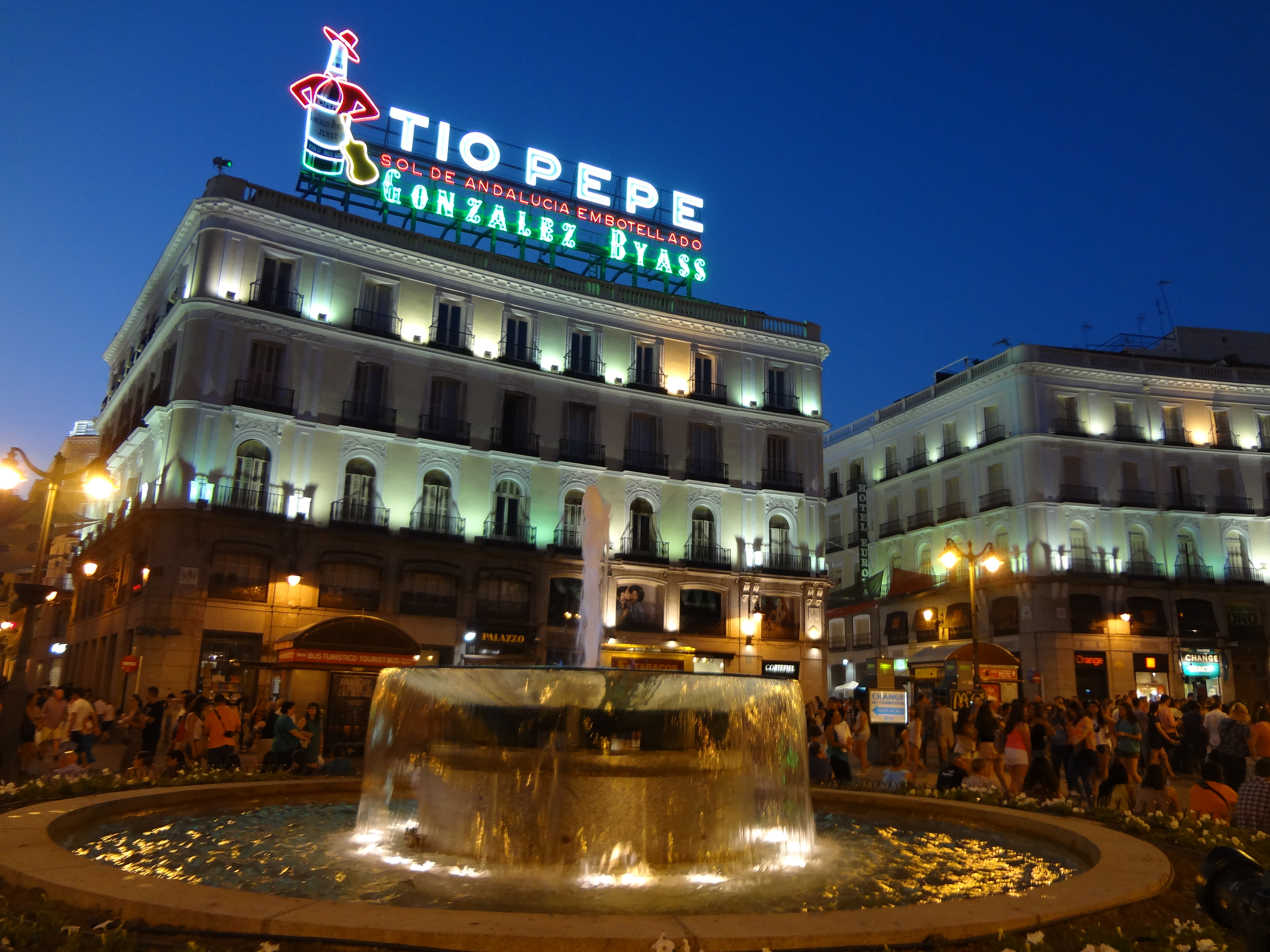
Puerta del Sol, Tio Pepe Neon Advertisement photographed at Sunset

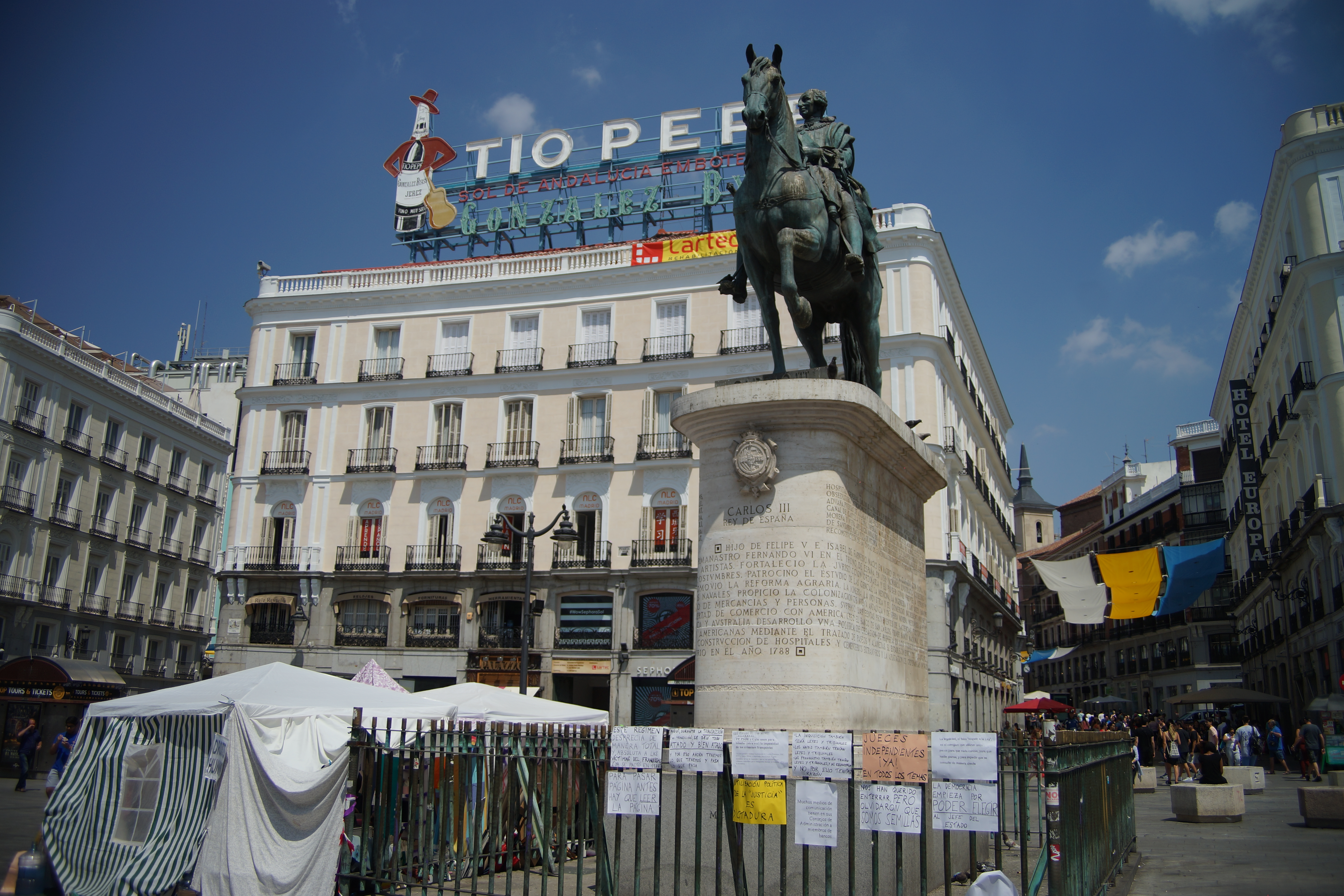
Puerta del Sol in Madrid with King Carlos III statue and Tio Pepe sign

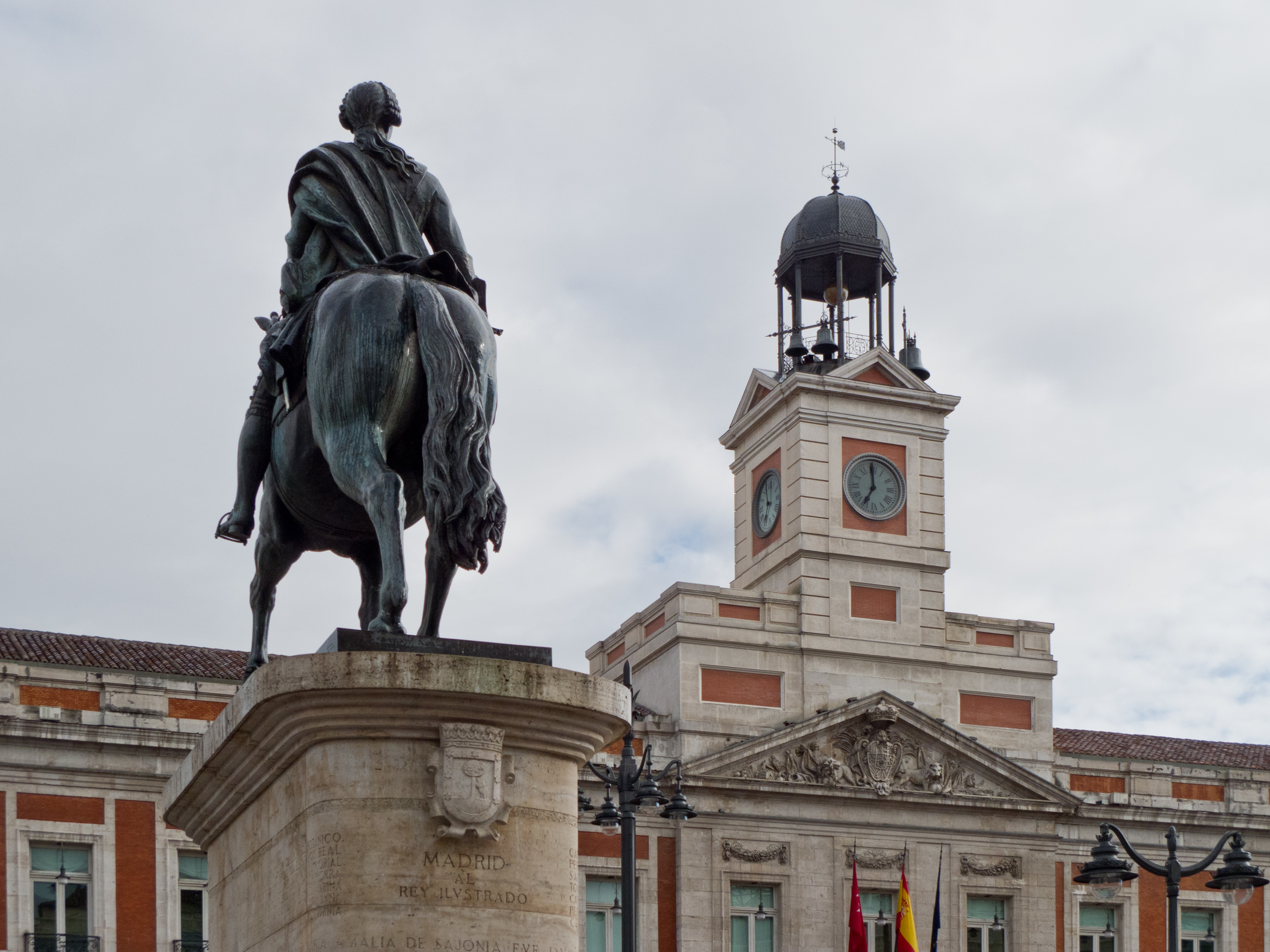
Monument to King Charles III in front of the House of the Post Office

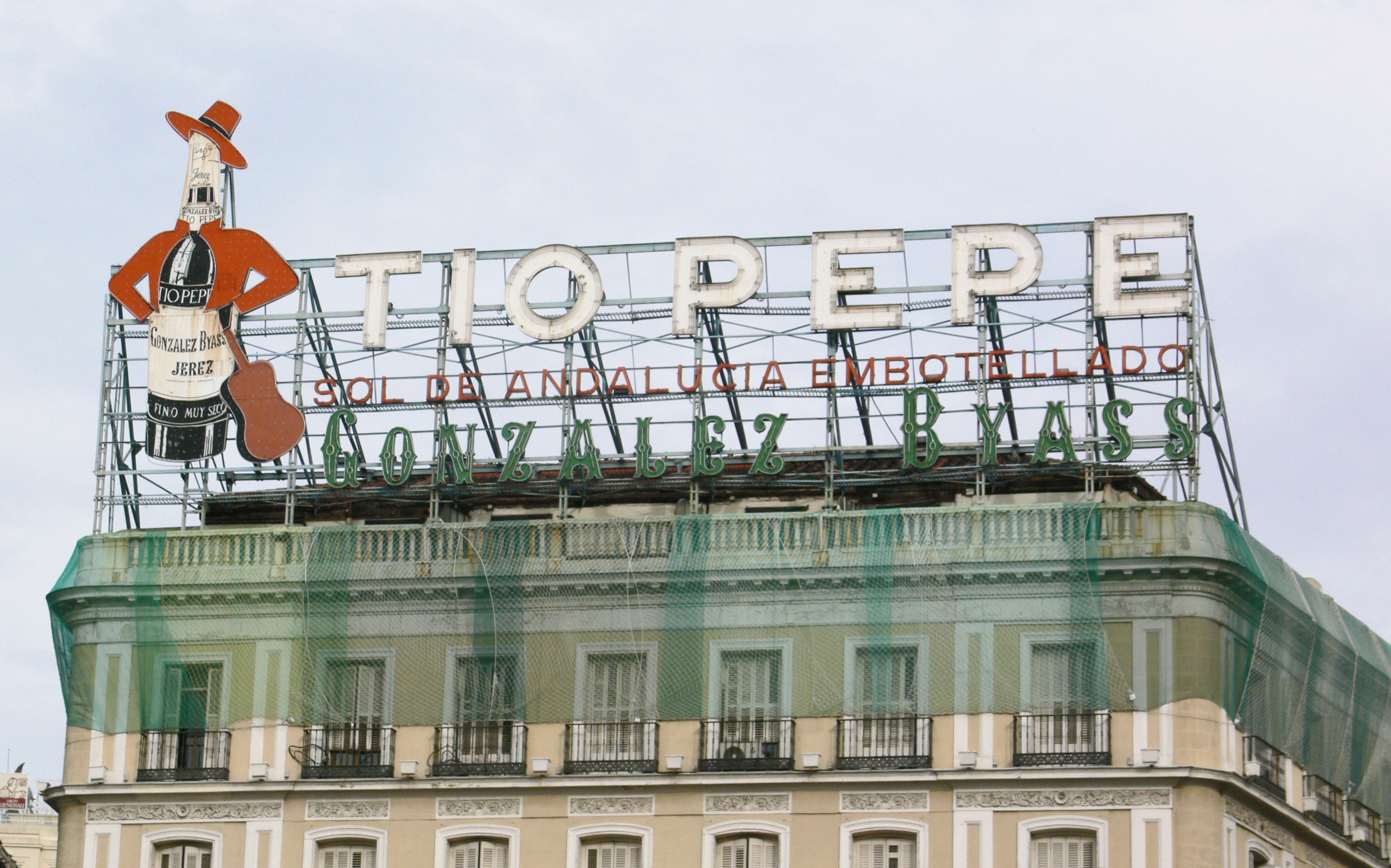
The Tío Pepe advertisement is a landmark

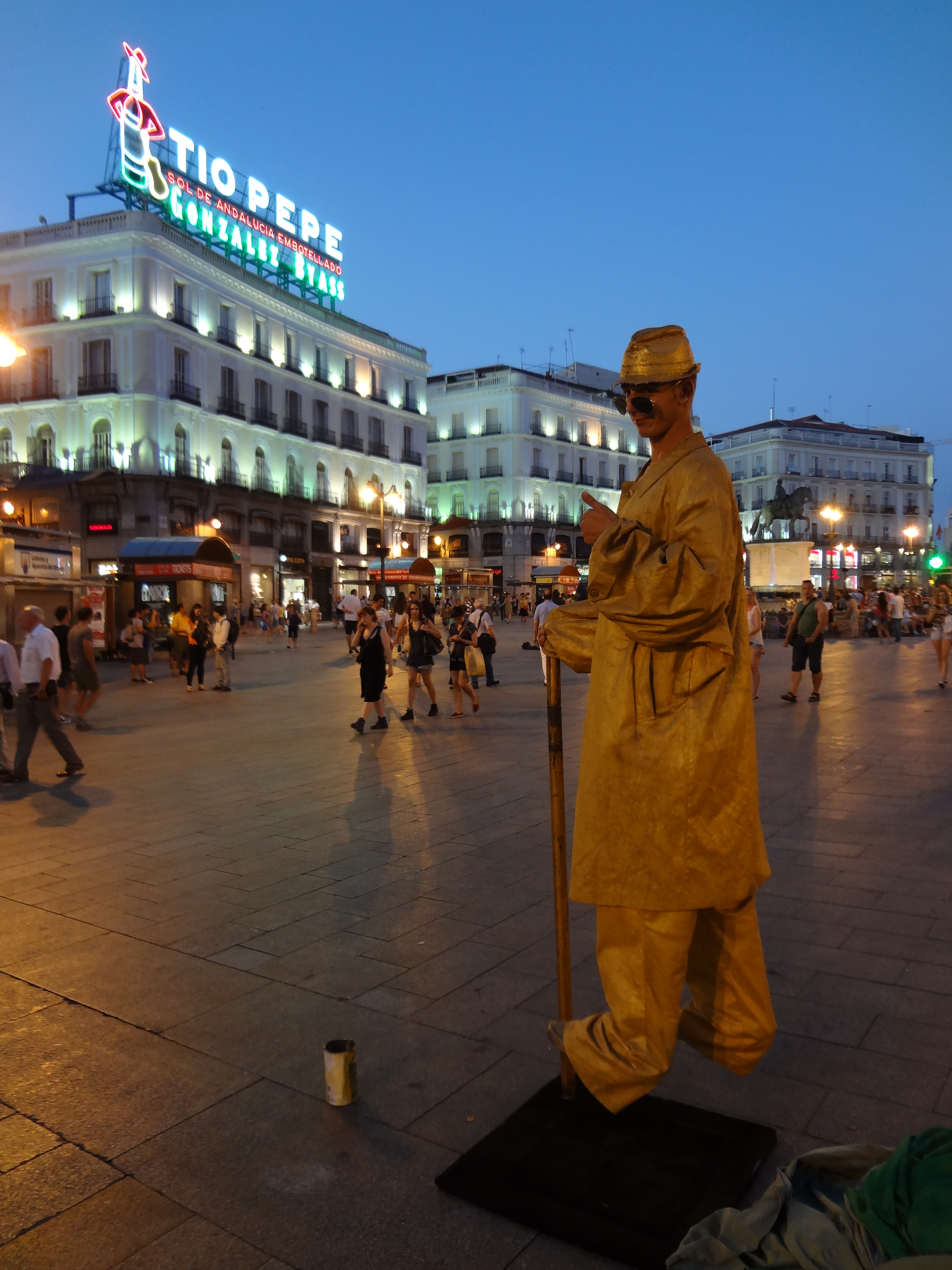
A Street artist at Puerta del Sol and the Tío Pepe Neon Advertisement photographed at Sunset.

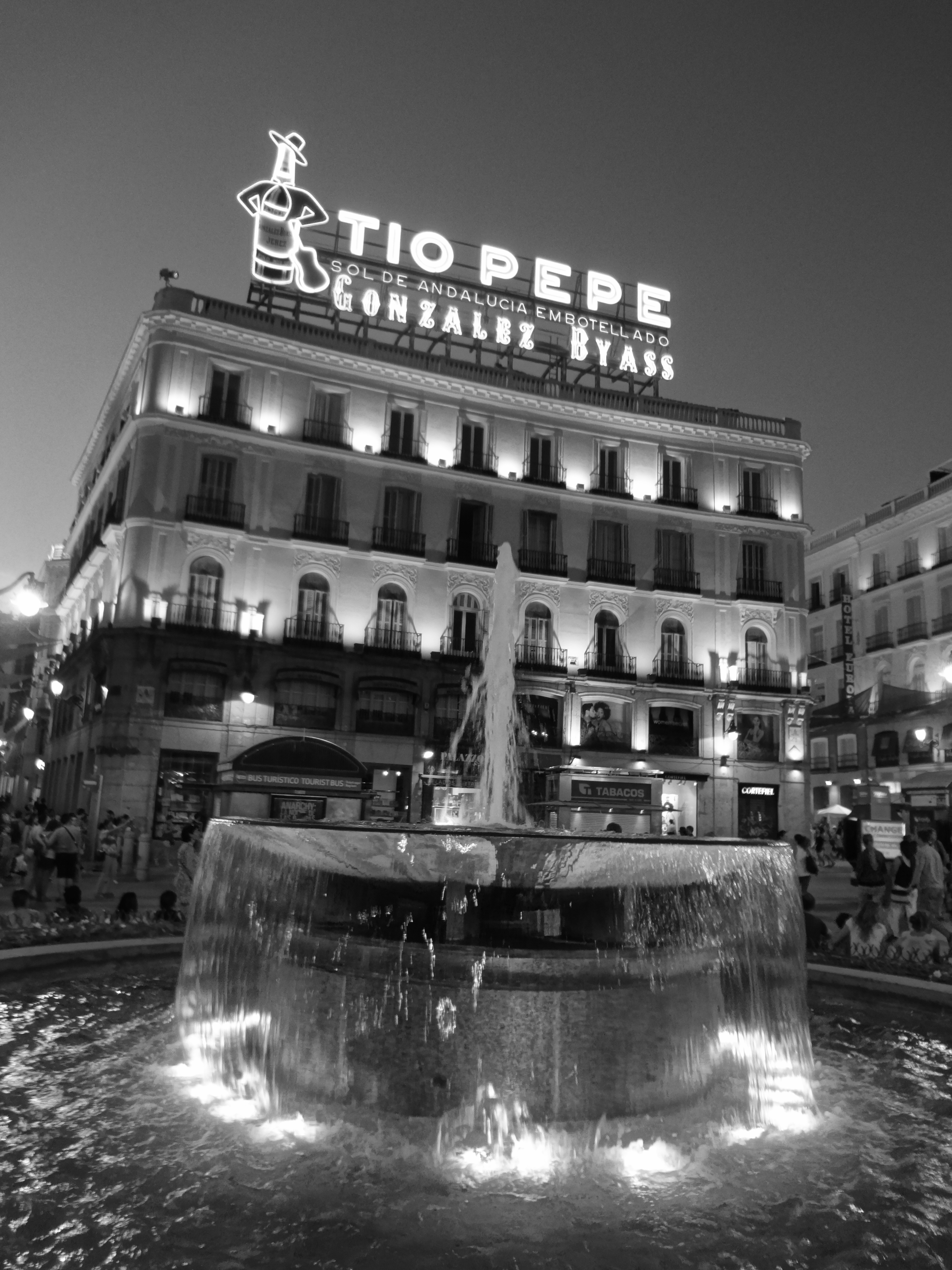
Tío Pepe Neon Advertisement ' Puerta Del Sol ' Madrid, Spain ' photographed at Sunset in black and white.

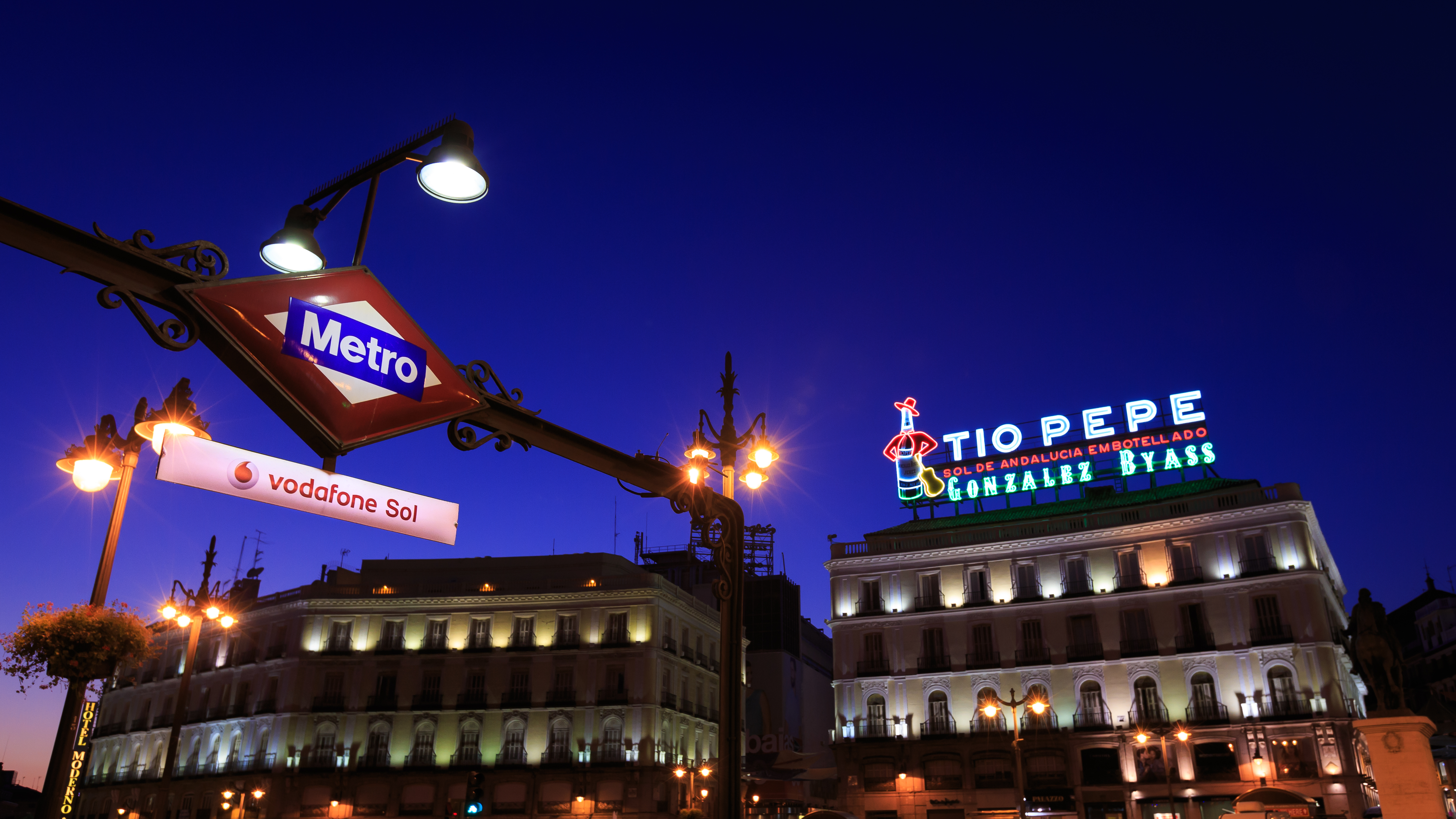
Puerta del Sol, Madrid Metro and the Tío Pepe Neon Advertisement at Sunset

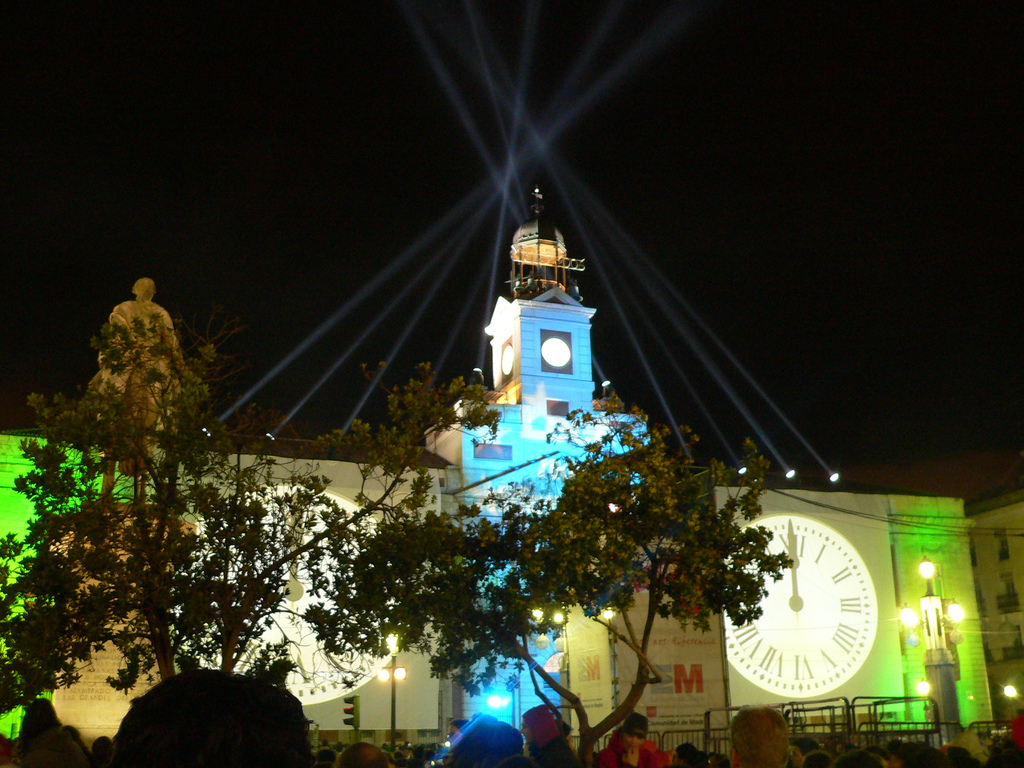
The New Year's Eve celebrations

== See also ==
- Fountain de La Mariblanca
