= 2019 Paris explosion =

Explosion caused by a gas leak in Paris, France

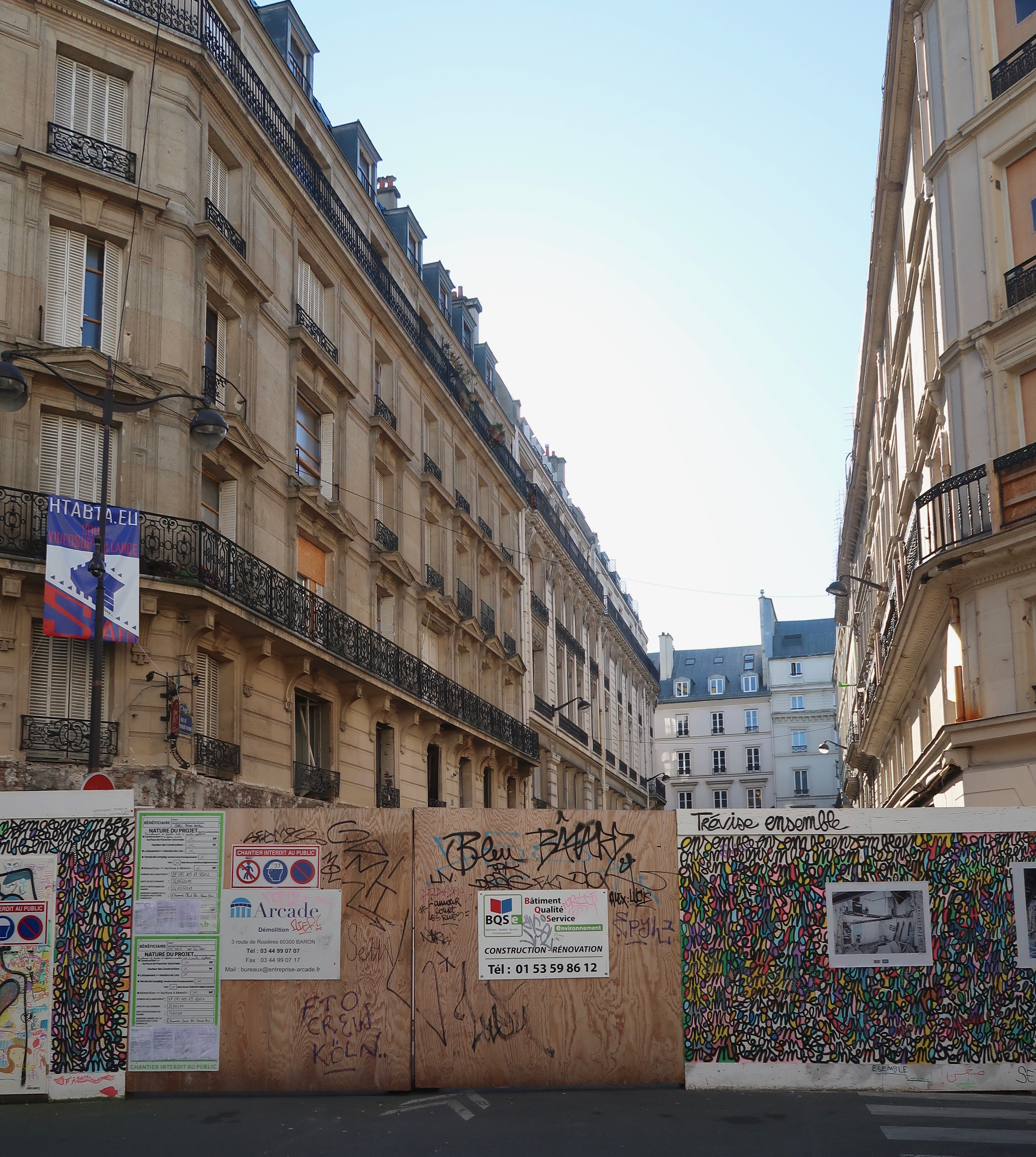
- Rue de Trévise in 2020
- Date: 12 January 2019
- Time: Approx. 09:00 CET
- Location: Rue de Trévise, 9th arrondissement, Paris, France; 48°52′22.4″N 2°20′42.6″E
- Cause: Gas leak
- Deaths: 4
- Injuries: 47

On 12 January 2019, an explosion occurred 6 Rue de Trévise in 9th arrondissement of Paris, France. Two firefighters, a Spanish tourist, and another woman were killed, and forty-seven other people were injured. According to local prosecutor Rémy Heitz, the apparent cause of the explosion was a gas leak. Firefighters were present at the time of the blast while investigating a suspected gas leak.

== Explosion ==
Prior to the explosion, firefighters were at the location responding to reports of a gas leak. The explosion caused a fire that destroyed windows of surrounding buildings and caused cars to be overturned. Eyewitnesses told reporters the blast also caused people to become trapped in other nearby buildings and charred debris and broken glass was spread around the bakery and streets.

== Aftermath ==
More than 200 firefighters responded to the incident, and French Interior Minister Christophe Castaner, Prime Minister Édouard Philippe, and Paris Mayor Anne Hidalgo all visited the scene.

On 15 September 2020, Paris City Hall and a property firm were charged with involuntary manslaughter.

== See also ==
- 2021 Madrid explosion
- List of explosions
